= Epic-Puranic royal genealogies =

Royal genealogies as described in Indian tradition

The Itihasa-Purana, the Epic-Puranic narratives of the Sanskrit Epics (Mahabharata and the Ramayana) and the Puranas, contain royal genealogies of the lunar dynasty and solar dynasty which are regarded by Indian traditions as historic events, and used in the Epic-Puranic chronology to establish a traditional timeline of Indian history.

== Cyclic time and yugas ==
The Puranas are oriented at a cyclical understanding of time. They contain stories about the creation and destruction of the world, and the yugas (ages). There are four yugas in one cycle:

- Satya Yuga (a time of truth and righteousness)
- Treta Yuga
- Dvapara Yuga
- Kali Yuga (a time of darkness and non-virtue)

According to the Manusmriti (c. 2nd CE), one of the earliest known texts describing the yugas, the length of each yuga is 4800, 3600, 2400 and 1200 years of the gods, respectively, giving a total of 12,000 divine years to complete one cycle. For human years, they are multiplied by 360 giving 1,728,000, 1,296,000, 864,000 and 432,000 years, respectively, giving a total of 4,320,000 human years. These four yugas have a length ratio of 4:3:2:1.

The Bhagavata Purana [3.11.18-20] (c. 500-1000 CE) gives a matching description of the yuga lengths in divine years.

The Kali Yuga is the present yuga. According to Puranic sources, Krishna's departure marks the end of Dvapara Yuga and the start of Kali Yuga, (Note: The Bhagavata Purana (1.18.6), Vishnu Purana (5.38.8), and Brahma Purana (2.103.8) state that the day Krishna left the earth was the day that the Dvapara Yuga ended and the Kali Yuga began: * Bhagavata Purana Part I. Motilal Banarsidass Publishers Private Limited. 1950. p. 137. "(1.18.6) On the very day, and at the very moment the Lord [Krishna] left the earth, on that very day this Kali, the source of irreligiousness, (in this world), entered here." * Wilson, H. H. (1895). The Vishnu Purana. S.P.C.K. Press. p. 61. "(5.38.8) The Parijata tree proceeded to heaven, and on the same day that Hari [Krishna] departed from the earth the dark-bodied Kali age descended." * Brahma Purana Part 2. Motilal Banarsidass. 1955. p. 515. "(2.103.8) It was on the day on which Krishna left the Earth and went to heaven that the Kali age, with time for its body set in.") which is dated to 17/18 February 3102 BCE, twenty years after the Bharata War.

== Vaivasvata Manu and the Solar and Lunar Dynasties ==
The Solar dynasty and Lunar dynasty were two legendary principal dynasties of the Kshatriyas varna, or warrior–ruler class mentioned in the ancient Indian texts.

The present Kalpa is called Varaha. Out of the fourteen manvantaras in this Kalpa, six have passed. The traditions tell that in the Chakshusha manvantara, the sixth manvantara, which immediately preceded the present manvantara, king Prithu, the great-grandson of Chakshusha Manu, leveled the earth, built cities and villages and developed agriculture, trade, pasture and cattle-breeding. This cycle ended after only eight more generations with the Great Flood. The seventh and current Manvantara is called Vaivasvata after the Manu who presides over it. It is to Vaivasvata Manu that the royal genealogies of the Itihasa trace their origin.

According to Harivamsa, Ikshvaku is considered the primogenitor of the Suryavamsha, or the Solar dynasty, and was granted the kingdom of Aryavarta by his father Vaivasvata Manu. Manu settled down in the Aryavarta region after he survived the great flood. A. K. Mozumdar states that Manu is the one who built a city on the Sarayu (being the river that his mother Sanjana was the goddess of) and called it Ayodhya meaning the 'invincible city'. This city served as the capital of many kings from the solar dynasty and is also believed to be the birthplace of Rama.

The Lunar dynasty (IAST: Candravaṃśa) was said to be descended from moon-related deities (Soma or Chandra). According to the Shatapatha Brahmana, Pururavas was the son of Budha (himself often described as the son of Soma) and the gender-switching deity Ila (born as the daughter of Manu). Pururavas's great-grandson was Yayati, who had five sons named Yadu, Turvasu, Druhyu, Anu, and Puru. These seem to be the names of five Vedic tribes as described in the Vedas.

== Satya Yuga ==
The Great Flood at the end of Chakshusa manvantara wipes away all life forms. Only Vaivasvata Manu is saved by Lord Vishnu, in the avatar of a fish, Matsya to repopulate the earth in the next cycle. All royal lines in the present cycle are traced in the itihasas from Manu Vaivasvata's sons and his only daughter Ila. Ikshvaku, the eldest son of Manu, establishes the Solar Line (from Vivasvan, the sun-god, the father of Vaivasvata Manu) at Ayodhya in Kosala. Iksvaku's younger son Nimi migrates a little further east and founds the house of Videha. Its capital Mithila is established by his son Mithi, also called Janaka which later becomes the generic name for the kings of Videha.

The lunar dynasty is established at about the same time, at Pratishthana (identified with a suburb of modern-day Prayagraj) in Madhyadesha (the doab between Ganga and Yamuna rivers) by Pururavas, the son of Ila and Budha, the illegitimate child of Soma, the moon-god. The tale of his love for the nymph Urvasi is a tale that has caught the Indian imagination for generations. It is the subject of a famous classical work by Kalidasa called Vikramorvasiyam. While Ayus, the elder son of Pururavas ascends the throne after him, his younger brother, Amavasu founds another dynasty that reigned over a kingdom, centred around Kanyakubja (modern Kannauj).

The lunar line again splits into two after the reign of Ayus, the eldest son of Pururavas. Nahusa, the eldest son of Ayus, succeeds him, but obtains the position of Indra in the heaven but is banished from there when he lusts after Sachi, the wife of Indra. Ksatravrddha, another son of Ayus, establishes the dynasty of Kashi (Varanasi). His descendants were called Kaseyas.

Nahusa's son and successor Yayati was a renowned conqueror and was reckoned as a cakravartin. He had two sons named Yadu and Turvasu from Devayani, the daughter of Sukra, the preceptor of asuras. He also had three other sons, Druhyu, Anu and Puru from Sarmistha, the daughter of asura king Vrsaparva. Yayati installs Puru, the youngest. but the most dutiful son as his successor in the ancestral sovereignty in Pratisthana. The elder sons obtain the outlying areas. From the sons of Yayati, descend the five famous royal lines of the Yadavas, the Turvasus, the Druhyus, the Anavas and the Pauravas, together called the Pancha Jana or the Five Tribes.

Immediately after Yadu, the Yadava dynasty is bifurcated – the main line continued by Krosti and the independent line of Haihayas led by Sahasrajit. The Yadava branch first develops a great principality under king Sasabindu, who becomes a cakravrtin. King Mandhata, the son of Yuvansva, the king of Ayodhya marries his daughter Bindumati and rises to eminence. He follows in the footsteps of his father-in-law, extends his sway very widely and becomes a cakravrtin himself. His son Purukutsa marries Narmada, the river goddess. Another son, also a famous king, called Mucukunda builds and fortifies a town on the bank of that river; it was Mahismati.

Soon thereafter, the Druhyu king Gandhara retires to the northwest (modern Khyber-Pakhtunkhwa) and establishes the kingdom of Gandhara there. His descendants scatter into the regions beyond India and establish many mleccha principalities. Later, the Anavas divide into two branches under Usinara and Titiksu. The sons of Usinara establish separate tribes of the Yaudheyas, Ambasthas, Navarastras, Krimilas and Sivis in eastern Punjab. Sivi, the son of Usinara and the originator of the Sivis in Sivapura, is celebrated in the Indian mythology for his generosity. His sons set up the kingdoms of Vrsadarbhas, Madrakas, Kaikayas and Sauviras, and occupy the whole Punjab. The other branch of the Anavas under Titiksu moved east and founded the principalities of Anga, Banga, Kalinga, Suhma and Pundra.

The Haihaya king Krtavirya had the Bhargavas as his priests and enriched them. His kinsmen tried to recover the wealth but the Bhargavas resisted. The Haihayas then maltreated them due to which they fled to different countries. Gadhi was then king of Kanyakubja and had a daughter Satyavati. The Bhargava rsi Rcika marries her and begets a son Jamadagni. About the same time Gadhi has a son Visvamitra.

In the solar line, Trayyaruna, a near contemporary of Gadhi and Krtavirya, ruled the kingdom of Ayodhya at this time. On the counsel of his priest Vasistha, he exiles his son Satyavrata, also called Trisanku. After Trayyaruna, Vasistha refuses to perform Trisanku's consecration. A little later, Visvamitra of Kanyakubja tries to obtain the wishing cow Nandini of Vasistha. A fierce combat follows between the two, in which Visvamitra is defeated. Convinced of the superiority of brahmins, he resolves to become a brahmarsi and relinquishes his throne. When engaged in austerities, Visvamitra is befriended by Trisanku. He then champions Trisanku's cause, performs his royal consecration and on his death elevates him in his living body to heaven.

The rivalry of Visvamitra and Vasistha continues even during the reign of Hariscandra, Trisanku's son. Hariscandra had a son Rohita, whom he had vowed to sacrifice to Varuna. He postponed the sacrifice for many years due to which he is afflicted with dropsy. Rohita, on Vasistha's advice, to propitiate Varuna, buys Ajigarta's son Sunahsepa (who is Visvamitra's grandnephew) as sacrificial victim in his stead. When about to be killed, Sunahsepa chants the varunamantra, taught to him by Visvamitra. Varuna appears, grants the boy his freedom and the king a cure from the disease. Visvamitra then adopts the boy as his chief son with the name Devarata. A number of Visvamitra's sons, who protest against the status given to Devarata, are cursed by their angry father to become outcastes. They become the ancestors of Dasyu tribes, such as the Andhras, Mutibas, Pulindas, etc. Visvamitra, subsequently, obtains the position of a brahmarsi.

In the Haihaya line, Krtavirya was succeeded by his son Arjuna Kartavirya, who was a mighty king. After a long reign he has dissension with Jamadagni. As a result, Parasurama, the son of Jamadagni by Renuka, the daughter of a minor Iksvaku king, kills Kartavirya Arjuna, whereupon Kartavirya's son's kill Jamadagni. In revenge, Parasurama resolves to slaughter the entire class of warriors (kshatriyas), and so far succeeds that only five survive to continue the great dynasties.

After Kartavirya, the Haihayas divided into five collateral tribes – the Talajanghas, the Vitihotras, the Avantyas, Tudikeras and Jatas. They attack Ayodhya and drive king Bahu from the throne. They also attack, defeat and drive the Kasi king Divodasa from Varanasi. Pratardana, the son of Divodasa subdues the Vitihotras and recovers the throne. A little later, Bahu begets a son Sagara, and Sagara defeats all those enemies, regains his kingdom and destroys the Haihaya power for good.

Sagara had sixty thousand sons who insult Kapila rsi and are, in turn, reduced to ashes by him. Therefore, Sagara is succeeded by his grandson Amsuman on the throne of Ayodhya. With the reign of Sagara, the Satya Yuga comes to an end.

== Treta Yuga ==
Bhagiratha, the great-grandson of Sagara brings down the divine river Ganges to earth to expiate the sins of the sons of Sagara. Rtuparna is the next prominent king in the dynasty made famous by his association with Nala, the king of Nisadas. Nala married Damayanti, the daughter of Bhima, the Yadava king of Vidarbha. The delightful story of their marriage and the unhappy sequel of his subsequent temporary loss of his kingdom and destitution through gambling, is in the Mahabharata told to Yudhishthira suffering in similar circumstances.

After a long eclipse (corresponding to the ascendency of the solar dynasty under Mandhata), the Paurava line is revived by Dusyanta, a near contemporary of Bhagiratha. He marries Sakuntala, the daughter of Visvamitra and begets Bharata. Bharata is crowned as a cakravartin and later gives his name to the dynasty, to the great fratricidal war between the Kauravas and Pandavas, and to India itself (i.e. Bharatavarsa). His fifth successor Hastin shifts the capital to a place in the upper doab and calls it Hastinapura, after himself.

Soon after Hastin, the Bharata dynasty is divided into four separate lines – the most well-known being the main Paurava line and the Pancala line. The Pancala king Divodasa is celebrated as the destroyer of 99 forts of the dasyu Sambara. His sister was Ahalya, the wife of Gautama Maharishi. She was deceived by Indra and expelled into the forest by her husband on account of her infidelity.

The solar line once again ascends under the benevolent kingship of Raghu, Aja and Dasharatha. The story of Rama, Dasharatha's son, forms the subject of the poem Ramayana by Valmiki. The intrigues of his stepmother Kaikeyi result in the exile of Rama, his wife Sita and his brother Laksmana to the forest. In the forest, Sita is abducted by Ravana, the king of rakshasas and imprisoned in Lanka, his capital. Rama forms an alliance with the monkeys and the bears of the forest and lays a siege of Lanka. Ravana is ultimately defeated and slain by Rama. He then returns to Ayodhya with his wife Sita and ascends the throne.

With Rama's disappearance, the Treta Yuga comes to a close and the Dvapara Yuga commences. After Rama the solar dynasty goes into permanent decline.

== Dvapara Yuga ==
The Yadava line is once again split into two separate lines after the reign of Bhima, the son of Satvat by his sons Andhaka and Vrsni, who style their dynasties after their respective names. Ugrasena, the father of Kamsa was an Andhaka while Vasudeva Anakadundubhi, the father of Krishna was a Vrsni.

The Pancala Bharata dynasty under its king Srnjaya now rises to prominence. His son Cyavana-Pijavana was a great warrior and the latter's son, Sudas, annexed several kingdoms. A confederacy of the kings of the Pauravas, the Yadavas, the Sivis, the Druhyus, the Matsyas, the Turvasus and others, is formed against Sudas, who defeats them in a great battle near the river Parusni. This is called the Battle of the Ten Kings. The bulk of hymns (Book II-IX) represents only 5 to 6 generations of kings (and of contemporary poets) of this dynasty.

The Paurava line continues through Ajamidha, the son of Hasti. In his line, king Samvarana was defeated and exiled to the forests on the bank of river Sindhu by the Pancalas. Pargiter identifies this Pancala king as Sudas but the exact relationship between the dynasties, chronological and political, is not recorded. Later, Samvarana reobtains his capital from the Pancalas and marries Tapati, a daughter of the Sun. The playwright Kulasekhara (c. 900AD) has immortalized their story in his play Tapatisamvarana. Their son was Kuru and his descendants were called Kauravas. The line continues through Kuru's second son Jahnu.

Vasu, a descendant of Kuru conquers the Yadava kingdom of Cedi, and establishes himself there. His eldest son, Brhadratha founds Girivraja in Magadha as his capital. His son Jarasandha extends his power up to Mathura (ruled by Andhaka king, Kamsa, who acknowledged him as overlord) in the north and Vidarbha in the south. Kamsa was a tyrant. He had imprisoned his father and usurped the throne. His nephew Krishna kills him and restores the old king to his throne. This rouses Jarasandha's wrath and he attacks Mathura. Krishna along with the Andhakas and Vrsnis migrate to the West coast and build a new capital Dvaravati (Dvaraka) in Saurastra. Krishna then abducts Rukmini, the princess of Vidarbha, defeating her brother and marries her. In later life, Krishna becomes the friend of the Pandavas.

The next famous king in the Kaurava line is Pratipa. His son, Santanu supersedes his elder brother Devapi to the throne, whereupon no rain falls for twelve years. Devapi then acts as a Hotr (chief priest) and performs sacrifice for his brother and obtains rain.

Santanu's grandsons were Dhrtarastra and Pandu. The former being blind, the latter ascends the throne. Dhrtarastra has many sons of whom Duryodhana is the eldest; and Pandu has five sons, Yudhishthira, Bhima, Arjuna, Nakula and Sahadeva. The sons of Dhrtarastra belonging to the elder branch were called Kauravas and Pandu's sons, the Pandavas. The question of succession to the throne results in a feud between the two families culminating in the appalling slaughter in the Bharata War. All the old kshatriya dynasties of India, it is said, took part in the great battle, fighting on one side or the other. In the battle, which lasts for eighteen days, the ruses of Krishna enable the hard pressed Pandavas to win. The Mahabharata narrates the story of this feud in detail.

Subsequently, the Yadavas are themselves engulfed in civil war, and Krishna withdraws to the life of an ascetic in the forest. Here he is accidentally shot and killed by a hunter. His grandson is re-established at Indraprastha by the Pandavas. Soon the Pandavas themselves crown Pariksita, the grandson of Arjuna on the throne of Hastinapura and retire to the forest. The Dvapara Yuga closes with the departure of Krishna.

== Kali Yuga ==
Pariksita, on a hunting expedition, disrespects rsi Samika and is in turn, cursed by his son Srngin to die from snake Taksaka’s poison within seven days. Taksaka buys off Kasyapa, the only person who has an antidote to the poison. At the end of seven days, Pariksit dies from Taksaka's bite. His son Janamejaya, who was a minor then, later hears his father's death from his ministers, and resolves on revenge. He organizes a rite (sarpasatra) to destroy all snakes. The snakes enter the sacrificial fire by the power of the rite. Astika, (a half snake from his mother's side) who was begotten to save them, enters the rite and wins a boon of his choice by singing the praises of Janamejaya. He demands the proceedings be halted. Janamejaya cannot refuse and concludes the rite. It is during this rite that Vaisampayana, a disciple of Vyasa narrates the Mahabharata to Janamejaya.

Nicaksu, sixth in line from Pariksita, transfers his capital from Hastinapura to Kausambi in Vasta as the former city is ravaged by a flood of the Ganges. The line continues for many generations till Udayana, the famous king of Vatsa (and a contemporary of Buddha) who carries off Vasavadatta, the princess of Avanti. Their tale is celebrated first by Gunadhya in his novel Brhatkatha and later by Bhasa and Shudraka in their dramas Svapnavasavadatta and Vinavasavadatta, respectively.

In Magadha, the descendants of Brhadratha and Jarasandha retain the throne till they are replaced by the Sisunaga dynasty, which among others include the famous kings Bimbisara and Ajatashatru. Mahapadma Nanda usurps the throne from the last king of the Sisunaga line. He overthrows all old kshatriya dynasties - the Iksvakus, the Pancalas, the Kaseyas, the Haihayas, the Kalingas, the Asmakas, the Kurus, the Maithilas, the Surasenas and the Vitihotras – and subdues the whole central India. The Puranas, hence, call him the 'destroyer of all kshatriyas' and 'monarch of the whole earth which was under his sole sway'. After the sisunaga dynasty Magadha rule was carry on by the Maurya Dynasty .

According to the Mahabharata, the Kali Yuga will close with the coming of Kalki, at which point the Satya Yuga will recommence. (Note: "And when those terrible times will be over, the creation will begin anew. … the Krita age will begin again. … And commissioned by Time, a Brahmana of the name of Kalki will take his birth. And he will glorify Vishnu and possess great energy, great intelligence, and great prowess. … And he will restore order and peace in this world crowded with creatures and contradictory in its course. … And he will be the Destroyer of all, and will inaugurate a new Yuga.")

== Genealogies as a source of actual history ==
Historian Romila Thapar discusses the problem of associating "major lineages of the early tradition" with archaeological evidence (e.g. with Painted Grey Ware or Chalcolithic Black and Red Ware), understanding the Puranic genealogies as "records of a general pattern of settlements and migrations", rather than "factual information on history and chronology". She tries, however, to associate the chronology of the "obviously more significant lineages, that of the Puru and the Yadavas" with different archaeological layers.

Like Pargiter, she divides the Puru lineage into three distinct phases, connecting phase I (from Manu to Bharata) with the Ochre Coloured Pottery, phase II (after a break, from Bharata's "adopted sons" to Kuru) with the Painted Grey Ware; phase III (starting from Kuru) being terminated by the Mahabharata war. The Yadava line is associated with the Black and Red ware, the geographical distribution of which is traced in connection with the different branches and migrations of the Yadava tribe, according to the Puranic sources.

Thapar concludes, however more cautiously, (Note: Thapar: "The attempt to link the Puru and Yadava lineages with certain archaeological cultures ... has resulted in some echoes of identification, but nothing more definite than that can be said at this point. The identification remains speculative") by considering the problem of chronology (archaeological evidence versus "traditional" chronology) and the question of identifying the Indo-Aryan speakers, phase I (up to Bharata) being understood as a pre-Indo-Aryan lineage, which was taken over later into the tradition of the Aryan-speaking people.

== Sources ==
- Flood, Gavin, ed. (2003), The Blackwell Companion to Hinduism, Blackwell Publishing, ISBN 0-631-21535-2
- Klostermaier, Klaus K. (2007). A Survey of Hinduism (3rd ed.). SUNY Press. ISBN 978-0-7914-7082-4.
- Mazumdar, A.K. (2008). The Hindu history. Rupa Publications India. ISBN 978-81-86772-17-1.
- Olivelle, Patrick (2005), Manu's Code of Law, Oxford University Press, ISBN 978-0195171464
- Rocher, Ludo (1986), The Purāṇas, Otto Harrassowitz Verlag
- Singh, Upinder (2008), History of Ancient and Early Medieval India: From the Stone Age to the 12th Century, Pearson Education India
- Thapar, Romila (2013), The Past Before Us, Harvard University Press, ISBN 978-0-674-72651-2

== See also ==
- Hindu mythology
- History of India
- Historicity of the Mahabharata
