= Sayyid Taqiuddin Muhammad =

Sayyid Taqiuddin Muhammad Bhaakri was born at Jhunsi, district Allahabad, India in 720 H (1320 AD). In his early life he gained knowledge of Shariyat (law) and Tariqat (path of spirituality) from his father Ali Murtaza Bayabani, who was a Sufi of Soharwardi order. Sayyid Taqiuddin left for Bukhara in what is now Uzbekistan in search of knowledge and higher education. He stayed there for 12 years and learned from Sayyid Muhammad Bhakkari. Later, he married daughter of Sayyid Muhammad Bhakkari. Afterwards, Taqiuddin returned to his home town Jhunsi and started spreading message of Islam. He died at the age of 64 or 65 years on 7th Zul hijja 785 H (31 January 1384) and his Shrine is located in Jhunsi (10 km from Allahabad).

== More Information ==
- Manba Al-Ansab, written by Shah Moin ul-Haq
- Tahrir al Mutaqid fi Halat al Murshid, written by Haji Rumi (Khalifa of Shaykh Taqi)
