= Epic-Puranic chronology =

Timeline of Hindu mythology based on the Hindu Epics and the Puranas

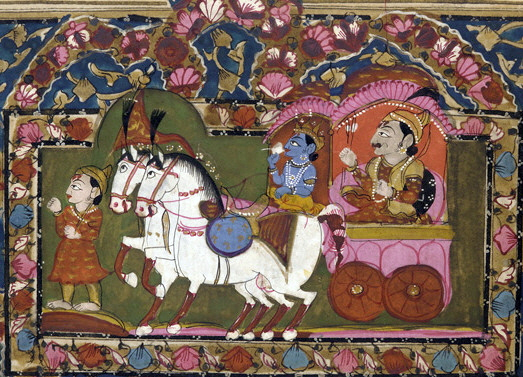
Krishna and Arjuna on their chariot at Kurukshetra, 18th century CE painting.

The Epic-Puranic chronology is a timeline of Hindu mythology based on the Itihasa (the Sanskrit Epics, that is, the Mahabharata and the Ramayana) and the Puranas. These texts have an authoritative status in Indian tradition, and narrate cosmogeny, royal genealogies, myths and legendary events. The central dates here are the Bharata War and the start of the Kali Yuga.

These texts often discuss very long lengths of time, such as the widespread statement that Vaivasvata Manu lived 28 yuga cycles before the writer's time, which, if the usual yuga cycle of 4,320,000 years is meant, is 120 million years.

There are many possible variations of the timeline, because there are many of these texts and many different manuscripts of some individual texts, which sometimes contradict each other about what happened when and the lengths of time between them, although some events are fairly universal.

Western historians usually regard the Epic-Puranic chronology as partly mythical, though containing elements of fact. In particular, the prevailing Indo-Aryan migration theory, based on archaeological, linguistic and genetic evidence, is that the Aryans entered India from Central Asia some time after 2000 BC, along with horses and the precursor of the Sanskrit language, meaning that most of the events in the epics and Puranas could not have taken place earlier than this. This contradicts the epics and Puranas, according to which many of the events that they describe took place much earlier than this and there have always been Aryans in India.

Among Indian authors, on the other hand, the historical accuracy of these traditions is a subject of lively (and sometimes politically charged) debate. The Epic-Puranic chronology is referred to by proponents of the Indigenous Aryans theory to propose an earlier dating of the Vedic period, and the spread of the Indo-European languages out of India, arguing that "the Indian civilization must be viewed as an unbroken tradition that goes back to the earliest period of the Sindhu-Sarasvati Valley traditions (7000 BCE to 8000 BCE)." However, support for the Indigenous Aryan Theory mostly exists among a subset of Indian scholars of Hindu religion and the history and archaeology of India, and plays a significant role in Hindutva (Hindu nationalist) politics. It has no relevance or support in mainstream scholarship.

== Itihasa-Purana ==
The Mahabharata and the Ramayana are the two major Sanskrit epics of ancient India. Together they form the Hindu Itihasa. The Mahābhārata narrates the struggle between two groups of cousins in the Bharata War, and the fates of the Kaurava and the Pāṇḍava princes and their successors. It also contains philosophical and devotional material, such as a discussion of the four "goals of life" or purusharthas (12.161). The bulk of the Mahabharata was probably compiled between the 3rd century BCE and the 3rd century CE, with the oldest preserved parts not much older than around 400 BCE.

The Ramayana narrates the life of Rama, the legendary prince of the Kosala Kingdom. Various recent scholars' estimates for the earliest stage of the text range from the 7th to 4th centuries BCE, with later stages extending up to the 3rd century CE.

The Puranas (literally "ancient, old",) is a vast genre of Indian literature about a wide range of topics, particularly legends and other traditional lore, composed in the first millennium CE. (Note: Wendy Doniger, based on the study of indologists, assigns approximate dates to the various Puranas. She dates Markandeya Purana to c. 250 CE (with one portion dated to c. 550 CE), Matsya Purana to c. 250–500 CE, Vayu Purana to c. 350 CE, Harivamsa and Vishnu Purana to c. 450 CE, Brahmanda Purana to c. 350–950 CE, Vamana Purana to c. 450–900 CE, Kurma Purana to c. 550–850 CE, and Linga Purana to c. 600–1000 CE.) The Hindu Puranas are anonymous texts and likely the work of many authors over the centuries.Gavin Flood connects the rise of the written Purana historically with the rise of devotional cults centering upon a particular deity in the Gupta era: the Puranic corpus is a complex body of material that advance the views of various competing sampradayas. The content is highly inconsistent across the Puranas, and each Purana has survived in numerous manuscripts which are themselves inconsistent.

The Mahabharata, Ramayana and the Puranas contain genealogies of kings, which are used for the traditional chronology of India's ancient history. Ludo Rocher in his book "The Puranas" (1986) provides a long list of chronological calculations based on Puranic lists with a warning that they are "often highly imaginative".

== Chronology ==
=== Cyclic time and yugas ===
The Puranas are oriented at a cyclical understanding of time. They contain stories about the creation and destruction of the world, and the yugas (ages). There are four yugas in one cycle:

- Satya Yuga (a time of truth and righteousness)
- Treta Yuga
- Dvapara Yuga
- Kali Yuga (a time of darkness and non-virtue)

According to the Manusmriti (c. 2nd CE), one of the earliest known texts describing the yugas, the length of each yuga is 4800, 3600, 2400 and 1200 years of the gods, respectively, giving a total of 12,000 divine years to complete one cycle. For human years, they are multiplied by 360 giving 1,728,000, 1,296,000, 864,000 and 432,000 years, respectively, giving a total of 4,320,000 human years. These four yugas have a length ratio of 4:3:2:1.

The Bhagavata Purana [3.11.18-20] (c. 500-1000 CE) gives a matching description of the yuga lengths in divine years.

The Kali Yuga is the present yuga. According to Puranic sources, Krishna's departure marks the end of Dvapara Yuga and the start of Kali Yuga, (Note: The Bhagavata Purana (1.18.6), Vishnu Purana (5.38.8), and Brahma Purana (2.103.8) state that the day Krishna left the earth was the day that the Dvapara Yuga ended and the Kali Yuga began: * Bhagavata Purana Part I. Motilal Banarsidass Publishers Private Limited. 1950. p. 137. "(1.18.6) On the very day, and at the very moment the Lord [Krishna] left the earth, on that very day this Kali, the source of irreligiousness, (in this world), entered here." * Wilson, H. H. (1895). The Vishnu Purana. S.P.C.K. Press. p. 61. "(5.38.8) The Parijata tree proceeded to heaven, and on the same day that Hari [Krishna] departed from the earth the dark-bodied Kali age descended." * Brahma Purana Part 2. Motilal Banarsidass. 1955. p. 515. "(2.103.8) It was on the day on which Krishna left the Earth and went to heaven that the Kali age, with time for its body set in.") which is dated to 17/18 February 3102 BCE, twenty years after the Bharata War.

These very long periods of time obviously present a problem for attempts to square the texts with archaeological evidence, as some characters are described as living in Treta Yuga or earlier, putting them before modern humans evolved. The word "yuga" sometimes seems to have been used for other lengths of time, such as a generation, a five-year cycle starting with the conjunction of the sun and moon in the autumnal equinox, or periods of 4800, 3600, 2400 and 1200 human years. Some authors have proposed that the accounts in question were originally referring to one of these shorter "yugas" and confusion occurred later.

=== Genealogies ===
The epics and Puranas also contain many extensive genealogies of monarchs and sometimes of other people such as priests and scholars, which provides some idea of what happened when. Sometimes the timelines suggested by these are very different from those suggested by other information in the texts such as references to when in the Yuga Cycle events took place. An example is the date of the Bharata War, as discussed below. There are cases where the later sections of the Puranic genealogies are known to contradict other historical texts, or each other.

=== Pre-Bharata War kings and avatars ===
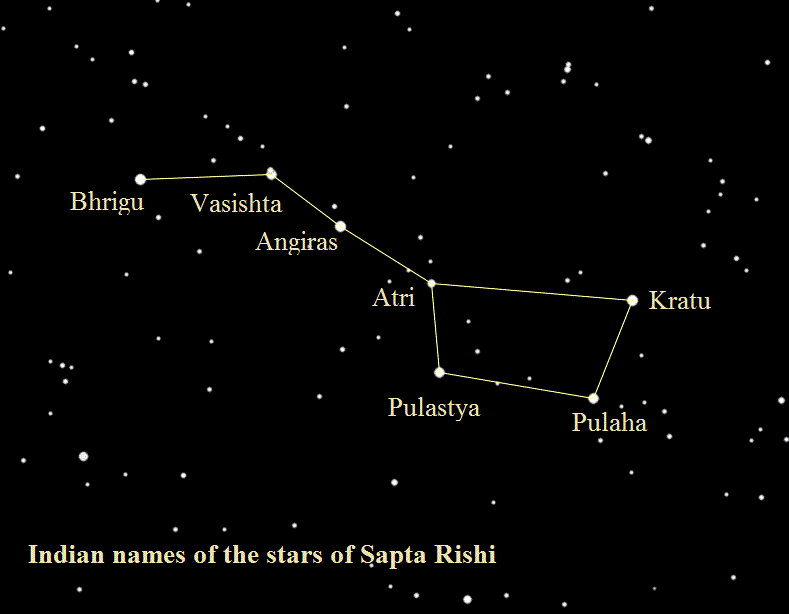
In traditional Hindu astronomy, seven stars of Ursa Major are identified with the names of the Saptarishis.

The Puranas, the Ramayana and the Mahabharata contain lists of kings and genealogies, from which the traditional chronology of India's ancient history are derived. Megasthenes, the Greek ambassador to the Maurya court at Patna at c. 300 BCE, reported to have heard of a traditional list of 153 kings that covered 6042 years, beyond the traditional beginning of the Kali Yuga in 3102 BCE. The royal lists are based on Sūta bardic traditions, and are derived from lists which were orally transmitted and constantly reshaped.

==== Vaivasvata Manu ====
The first king is Vaivasvata Manu, the seventh and current Manu of the fourteen manus of the current kalpa, the progenitor of humanity. According to the Puranas, he is the son of Vivasvat (also known as Surya), the Sun god, and his wife Saranyu. He is also known as Satyavrata and Shraddhadeva.

Vaivasvata Manu had seventy children, including Ila and Ikshvaku, the progenitors of the Lunar and Solar dynasties of the kshatriyas, which play a prominent role in the origin stories of the royal families of the Vedic period. The Mahabharata states that "it is of Manu that all men including Brahmanas, Kshatriyas, Vaishyas, Sudras, and others have been descended." (Note: Mahbharata: "And Manu was endowed with great wisdom and devoted to virtue. And he became the progenitor of a line. And in Manu's race have been born all human beings, who have, therefore, been called Manavas. And it is of Manu that all men including Brahmanas, Kshatriyas, Vaishyas, Sudras, and others have been descended, and are therefore all called Manavas. Subsequently, the Brahmanas became united with the Kshatriyas. And those sons of Manu that were Brahmanas devoted themselves to the study of the Vedas. And Manu begot ten other children named Vena, Dhrishnu, Narishyan, Nabhaga, Ikshvaku, Karusha, Sharyati, the eighth, a daughter named Ila, Prishadhru the ninth, and Nabhagarishta, the tenth. They all betook themselves to the practices of Kshatriyas (warriors). Besides these, Manu had fifty other sons on Earth. But we heard that they all perished, quarrelling with one another.")

==== Tentative chronology ====
The Puranas have been used by some to give a tentative overview of Indian history prior to the Bharata War. Gulshan (1940) dates the start of the reign of Manu Vaivasvata at 7350 BCE. The Puranas give 95 kings in the Ikshvaku dynasty between Shraddhadeva Manu (aka Manu Vaivasvata), the progenitor of humanity, and the Bharata War. Dating the Bharata War at 1400 BCE, A.D. Pusalkar (1962) uses this list to give the following chronology:

1. Pre-flood tradition and the dawn of history
2. The great flood and Manu Vaivasvata
3. The period of King Yayati (c. 3000–2750 BCE)
4. The period of King Mandhatri (c. 2750–2550 BCE)
5. The period of Parashurama, the sixth avatar of Vishnu (c. 2550–2350 BCE)
6. The period of Rama, the seventh avatar of Vishnu (c. 2350–1750 BCE)
7. The period of Krishna, the eighth avatar of Vishnu (c.1950–1400 BCE)
8. The Bharata War (c. 1400 BCE)

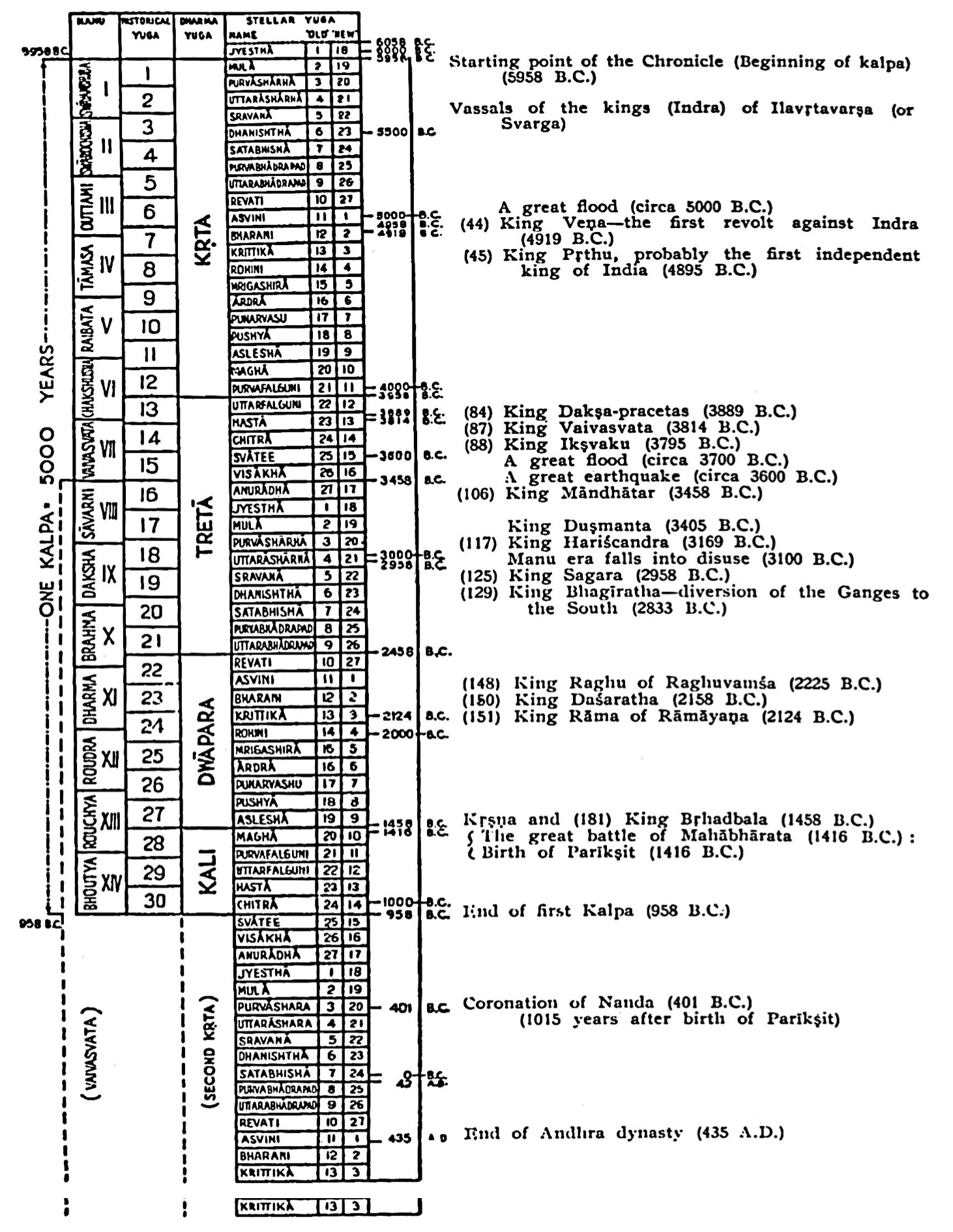
Puranic Chronology – A New Theory of Ancient Indian Chronology

=== Bharata War ===
Popular tradition holds that the Bharata War marks the transition to Kali Yuga. The mathematician Aryabhata (6th century) calculated the Kali Yuga epoch, based on planetary conjunctions, as 18 February 3102 BC. This date has become widespread in Indian tradition. Some sources mark this as the disappearance of Krishna from the Earth. The Aihole inscription of Pulikeshi II, dated to Shaka 556 (634 AD), claims that 3735 years have elapsed since the Bharata battle, putting the date of the Bharata War at 3101 BC.

Another traditional school of astronomers and historians, represented by Vriddha-Garga, Varahamihira (author of the Brihat-Samhita) and Kalhana (author of the Rajatarangini), place the war 653 years after the Kali Yuga epoch, corresponding to 2449 BC.

Puranic genealogies give a different date, saying that the war took place about 1,000 years before the beginning of the Nanda dynasty, leading to a date of about 1400 BC (F. E. Pargiter, comparing various different Puranas, suggested that the original number was 1,500 which was wrongly copied in various texts as 1000, 1015, or 1050, giving a date of about 1900 BC).

The historicity of the war is subject to scholarly discussion and dispute. The existing text of the Mahabharata went through many layers of development, and mostly belongs to the period between c. 500 BC and 400 AD. Within the frame story of the Mahabharata, the historical kings Parikshit and Janamejaya are featured significantly as scions of the Kuru clan, and Michael Witzel concludes that the general setting of the epic has a historical precedent in Iron Age (Vedic) India, where the Kuru kingdom was the center of political power during roughly 1200 to 800 BC. Professor Alf Hiltebeitel says that the Mahabharata is essentially mythological. Indian historian Upinder Singh has written that:

Whether a bitter war between the Pandavas and the Kauravas ever happened cannot be proved or disproved. It is possible that there was a small-scale conflict, transformed into a gigantic epic war by bards and poets. Some historians and archaeologists have argued that this conflict may have occurred in about 1000 BCE."

Despite the inconclusiveness of the data, attempts have been made to assign a historical date to the war.

Attempts to date the events using methods of archaeoastronomy have produced, depending on which passages are chosen and how they are interpreted, estimates ranging from the late 4th to the mid-2nd millennium BC.

- Vedveer Arya (author and MA in Sanskrit) gives the date of 3162 BC, by various arguments including interpreting the Aihole inscription as using the Old Shaka era which, based on a comparison of eclipses mentioned in inscriptions, he argues counts from 583 BC.
- P. V. Holey states a date of 13 November 3143 BC using planetary positions and calendar systems.
- K. Sadananda, based on translation work, states that the war started on 22 November 3067 BC.
- B. N. Achar used planetarium software to argue that the war took place in 3067 BC.
- S. Balakrishna concluded a date of 2559 BC using consecutive lunar eclipses.
- R. N. Iyengar concluded that out of a range of 501 BC - 3250 BC a date of 1478 BC was the best fit for the sequence of eclipses and planetary positions described in the text.
- P. R. Sarkar estimates a date of 1298 BC for the war.
- Dieter Koch (writer on the history of astronomy and astrology) dates the war to 1198 BC based on super-conjunctions.
- Kesheo Lakshman Daftari, one of the members of the Calendar Reform Committee which prepared the Indian national calendar, holds that the war took place in 1197 BC.

=== Post-Bharata War ===
The epics and Puranas give lists of various dynasties of kings after the war, which are sometimes confirmed by other sources and sometimes contradicted by them (and sometimes contradict each other).

The Vedic Foundation gives the following chronology of ancient India since the time of Krishna and the Bharata War: (Note: the Vedic Foundation, Chronology) (Note: The Vedic Foundation, Introduction: "The history of Bharatvarsh (which is now called India)'is the description of the timeless glory of the Divine dignitaries who not only Graced the soils of India with their presence and Divine intelligence, but they also showed and revealed the true path of peace, happiness and the Divine enlightenment for the souls of the world that still is the guideline for the true lovers of God who desire to taste the sweetness of His Divine love in an intimate style. (Note: The Vedic Foundation, Introduction))

- 3228 BCE – Descension of Krishna (Note: The earliest text to explicitly provide detailed descriptions of Krishna as a personality is the epic Mahabharata which depicts Krishna as an incarnation of Vishnu.)
- 3138 BCE – The Bharata War; start of Brihadrath dynasty of Magadha; start of Yudhisthir dynasty of Hastinapur
- 3102 BCE – Ascension of Krishna; start of Kali Yuga
- 2139 BCE – End of Brihadratha dynasty
- 2139–2001 BCE – Pradyota dynasty
- 2001–1641 BCE – Shaishunaga dynasty
- 1887–1807 BCE – Gautama Buddha (Note: Conventionally dated sometime between the sixth and fourth centuries BC.)
- 1641–1541 BCE – Nandas (Note: Conventionally dated 345–321 BC)
- 1541–1241 BCE – Maurya Empire (Note: Conventionally dated 322–185 BC)
- 1541–1507 BCE – Chandragupta Maurya (Note: Conventionally dated 340–298 BC)
- 1507–1479 BCE – Bindusara (Note: Conventionally dated c. 320 BC – 272 BC)
- 1479–1443 BCE – Ashokavardhan
- 1241–784 BCE – Shunga Empire and Kanva dynasty
- 784–328 BCE – Andhra dynasty (Note: Conventionally dated c. 230 BC–AD 220)
- 328–83 BCE – Gupta Empire (Note: Conventionally dated approximately AD 320–550)
- 328–321 BCE – Chandragupta Vijayaditya (Note: Conventionally dated: reign AD 320–335)
- 326 BCE – Alexander's invasion
- 321–270 BCE – Ashoka (Note: Conventionally dated 304–232 BC)
- 102 BCE – 15 CE – Vikramaditya, established Vikram era in 57 BCE

== Historicity ==
=== Archaeological vs. traditional interpretations ===
The history of India up to (and including) the times of the Buddha, with his life generally placed into the 6th or 5th century BCE, is a subject of a major scholarly debate. The vast majority of historians in the Western world accept the theory of Indo-Aryan migrations with c. 1500-1200 BCE dates for the displacement of Indus Valley Civilisation by Aryans and the earliest texts of the Rigveda, with Sanskrit being descended from the language that the Aryans brought with them. This is supported by linguistic and some archaeological evidence, but conflicts with the chronology given in the epics and Puranas, according to which the Vedas, written in Sanskrit, date from many years earlier than this. Many Indian scholars, on the other hand, support some version of the Indigenous Aryans theory, in which, as in the epics and Puranas, the Indian civilisation is of an indigenous nature and the earliest sections of the Rigveda date from c. 4000 BCE, or even earlier.

Early Indian history does not have an equivalent of chronicles (like the ones established in the West by Herodotus in the 5th century BC or Kojiki / Nihongi in Japan): "with the single exception of Rajatarangini (History of Kashmir), there is no historical text in Sanskrit dealing with the whole or even parts of India" (R. C. Majumdar). While there are texts in Sanskrit, the Puranas, that profess to include the early Indian history, the Western scholars assume them to be compiled by brahmins in the 1st millennium CE, thus being contemporary with the described facts only from the time of the Guptas (3rd century CE) and in general legendary.

=== Indigenous Aryanism - '10,000 years in India' ===
The Epic-Puranic chronology has been referred to by proponents of Indigenous Aryanism, putting into question the Indo-Aryan migrations at ca. 1500 BCE and proposing older dates for the Vedic period. The conventional position is that the Aryans migrated into Northern India from Central Asia after 2000 BCE, bringing with them their language, which was the precursor of Sanskrit, the language of the Vedas, Itihasas and Puranas. The "indigenists", however, claim that the Aryans are indigenous to India, and the Indo-European languages radiated out from a homeland in India into their present locations. According to them, the Vedas are older than the second millennium BCE, and texts like the Mahabharata reflect historical events which took place before 1500 BCE. Some of them equate the Indus Valley Civilisation with the Vedic Civilisation, state that the Indus script was the progenitor of the Brahmi, and state that there is no difference between the people living in the (northern) Indo-European part and the (southern) Dravidian part.

The theory of Indigenous Aryanism has no support in mainstream scholarship.

The idea of "Indigenous Aryanism" fits into traditional Hindu ideas about their religion, namely that it has timeless origins, with the Vedic Aryans inhabiting India since ancient times. (Note: The Vedic Foundation states: "The history of Bharatvarsh (which is now called India) is the description of the timeless glory of the Divine dignitaries who not only Graced the soils of India with their presence and Divine intelligence, but they also showed and revealed the true path of peace, happiness and the Divine enlightenment for the souls of the world that still is the guideline for the true lovers of God who desire to taste the sweetness of His Divine love in an intimate style.")

M. S. Golwalkar, in his 1939 publication We or Our Nationhood Defined, famously stated that "Undoubtedly [...] we — Hindus — have been in undisputed and undisturbed possession of this land for over eight or even ten thousand years before the land was invaded by any foreign race." Golwalkar was inspired by Tilak's (Note: Carol Schaeffer: "Tilak, dubbed the "father of Indian unrest" for his advocacy of violent tactics against British colonialists and inspiration to later Indian Hindu nationalists.") The Arctic Home in the Vedas (1903), who argued that the Aryan homeland was located at the North Pole, basing this idea on Vedic hymns and Zoroastrian texts. Golwalkar took over the idea of 10,000 years, arguing that the North Pole at that time was located in India. (Note: See also Is our civilisation really 10 millennia old? Or are we simply insecure?; Sanjeev Sabhlok (2013).)

Subhash Kak, a main proponent of the "indigenist position", underwrites the Vedic-Puranic chronology, and uses it to recalculate the dates of the Vedas and the Vedic people. According to Kak, "the Indian civilization must be viewed as an unbroken tradition that goes back to the earliest period of the Sindhu-Sarasvati (or Indus) tradition (7000 or 8000 BC)." According to Sudhir Bhargava, the Vedas were composed 10,000 years ago, when Manu supposedly lived, in ashrams at the banks of the Sarasvati River in Brahmavarta, the ancient home-base of the Aryans. According to Sudhir Bhargava, people from Brahmavarta moved out from Brahmavarta into and outside India after 4500 BCE, when seismic activities had changed the course of the Sarasvati and other rivers.

== See also ==
- New Chronology (Rohl)
- New chronology (Fomenko)
- Yuga
- Vedas
- Vedic science
- Solar dynasty
- Lunar dynasty
- Hindu cosmology
- Nasadiya Sukta
- Samudra Manthana
- Sanātana Dharma
- Brahmanda Purana
- History of India
- History of Hinduism
- Hindu mythological wars
- Puru and Yadu Dynasties
- List of Indian monarchs
- List of Hindu empires and dynasties

== Sources ==
=== Printed sources ===
- Brockington, J. L. (1998), The Sanskrit Epics, BRILL, ISBN 90-04-10260-4
- Collins, Charles Dillard (1988), The Iconography and Ritual of Śiva at Elephanta, SUNY Press, ISBN 978-0-88706-773-0
- Flood, Gavin D. (1996), An Introduction to Hinduism, Cambridge University Press
- Flood, Gavin, ed. (2003), The Blackwell Companion to Hinduism, Blackwell Publishing, ISBN 0-631-21535-2
- Ganguly, Dilip Kumar (1984), History and Historians in Ancient India, Abhinav Publications, ISBN 978-0-391-03250-7
- Hiltebeitel, Alf (2005), "Mahabaratha", in Jones, Lindsay (ed.), MacMillan Encyclopedia of Religion, MacMillan
- Kak, Subhash (1987). "On the Chronology of Ancient India" (PDF). Indian Journal of History of Science (22): 222–234. Archived from the original (PDF) on 2015-01-22.
- Kak, Subhash (1993). "Astronomy of the Vedic Alters" (PDF). Vistas in Astronomy. Vol. 36. pp. 117–140. ISSN 0083-6656. Archived from the original (PDF) on 2014-06-10.
- Kak, Subhash (1996). "Knowledge of Planets in the Third Millennium BC" (PDF). Quarterly Journal of the Royal Astronomical Society. 37: 709–715. Bibcode:1996QJRAS..37..709K.
- Kak, Subhash (2001), "On the Chronological Framework for Indian Culture" (PDF), Journal of Indian Council of Philosophical Research
- Klostermaier, K.K. (2014). Hinduism: A Short History. Oneworld Publications. ISBN 978-1-78074-680-7.
- Olivelle, Patrick (2005), Manu's Code of Law, Oxford University Press, ISBN 978-0195171464
- Rocher, Ludo (1986). "2.2.4 The purāņas as historical documents". The Purāṇas. History of Indian literature. Otto Harrassowitz Verlag. pp. 115–132. ISBN 978-3-447-02522-5.
- Singh, G. P. (2004). "The Puranic Tradition of Historiography in India". Indian Historical Review. 31 (1–2): 1–17. doi:10.1177/037698360403100201. ISSN 0376-9836.
- Singh, Upinder (2006), Delhi: Ancient History, Berghahn Books, ISBN 9788187358299
- Singh, Upinder (2008), History of Ancient and Early Medieval India: From the Stone Age to the 12th Century, Pearson Education India
- Singh, Upinder (2009), History of Ancient and Early Medieval India: From the Stone Age to the 12th Century, Longman, ISBN 978-8131716779
- Singh, Bal Ram (2010), Origin of Indian civilization (First ed.), Dartmouth: Center for Indic Studies, University of Massachusetts and D.K. Printworld, New Delhi, ISBN 978-8124605608, archived from the original on 2016-03-04
- Thapar, Romila (2013), The Past Before Us, Harvard University Press, ISBN 978-0-674-72651-2
- Trautmann, Thomas (2005), The Aryan Debate, Oxford University Press
- Warder, A.K. (2000), Indian Buddhism, Delhi: Motilal Banarsidass Publishers
- Witzel, Michael (1990). "On Indian historical writing: The case of the Vaṃśāvalīs". Journal of the Japanese Association for South Asian Studies. 1: 1–57.
- Witzel, Michael (1995), "Early Sanskritization: Origin and Development of the Kuru state" (PDF), EJVS, 1 (4), archived from the original (PDF) on 2007-06-11
- Witzel, Michael E. J. (2001). "Autochthonous Aryans? The Evidence from Old Indian and Iranian Texts". Electronic Journal of Vedic Studies. 7 (3): 1–115.
