= Pratishtha =

Pratishtha is the ritual consecration of religious images (murtis) including statues in Hinduism and Jainism. This may refer to:

- Panch Kalyanaka Pratishtha Mahotsava, a ritual in Jainism
- Prana Pratishtha, a ritual in Hindu Yogini temples
- Pratishthana, former name of Paithan, a town in Maharashtra, India; capital of king Shalivahana and the Satavahana dynasty
- Pratishthana or Pratishthanpur, ancient Indian town now in Jhunsi, Prayagraj, Uttar Pradesh, India; capital of the mythical Lunar dynasty
