= Itihasa-Purana =

Traditional Hindu accounts of "past events"

In Hinduism, Itihasa-Purana, also called the fifth Veda, refers to the traditional accounts of cosmogeny, myths, royal genealogies of the lunar dynasty and solar dynasty, and legendary past events, as narrated in the Itihasa (Mahabharata and the Ramayana) and the Puranas. They are highly influential in Indian culture, and many classical Indian poets derive the plots of their poetry and drama from the Itihasa. The Epic-Puranic chronology derived from the Itihasa-Purana is an influential frame of reference in traditional Indian thought.

== Etymology ==
Itihāsa, इतिहास, derives from the phrase iti ha āsa इति ह आस, which means "so indeed it was".

Purana, /pʊˈrɑːnə/; Sanskrit: पुराण, purāṇa literally means "ancient, old." (Note: Merriam-Webster's Encyclopedia of Literature (1995 Edition), Article on Puranas, ISBN 0-877790426, page 915)

== Characterisation ==
Itihasa refers to the Sanskrit Epics of the Mahabharata and the Ramayana. The Puranas are a vast genre of Hindu literature about a wide range of topics, particularly about cosmogony, myths, legends and purported history. Together they are also called the fifth Veda, "the Holy Book of the masses who were not entitled to study the four Vedas."

The tradition of Itihāsa is generally understood to be developed by the bardic tradition of Sūtas and Cāraṇas whose duties consisted of composing royal eulogies.

In the mythical narratives of the Itihasa-Purana there is no clear distinction between mythology, hagiography and historiography. The Indian tradition regards the Itihasa-Purana as authoritative historical writings, documenting past events and prescribing dharma, the right way to live. The Itihasa-Purana forms the basis for the Epic-Puranic chronology, the traditional timeline of legendary history. The Mahabharata includes the story of the Kurukshetra War and preserves the traditions of the Lunar dynasty in the form of embedded tales. The Ramayana contains the story of Rama and is incidentally related to the legends of the Solar dynasty. The Puranas provide the idea of yugas and the Dashavatara, the ten incarnations of Vishnu in the four respective yugas.

== Cosmogony and cyclic time (Yugas) ==
=== Yuga ===
According to the Hindu texts, time is cyclic. The history of mankind is divided into four ages—Satya Yuga, Treta Yuga, Dvapara Yuga and Kali Yuga—collectively forming one Maha Yuga. Seventy-one Maha Yugas form a Manvantara ("age of Manu"), a period of time over which a "Manu" presides. For the duration of his period, each Manu is the archetypal first man, the progenitor of humanity, and also the first king and lawgiver. Along with a Manu, every Manvantara also has its own set of Indra, gods and the seven sages. Fourteen Manus reign in Kalpa, (a single day in the life of) Brahma), an equivalent of 1,000 Maha Yugas, at the end of which, the creation is destroyed and is followed by a Pralaya (dissolution) of equal length. The creation starts again, in the next Kalpa in an endless cycle of creations and dissolutions.

=== Dashavatara ===
The Dashavatara refers to the ten primary (i.e. full or complete) incarnations (avatars) of Vishnu, the Hindu god of preservation which has Rigvedic origins. Vishnu is said to descend in the form of an avatar to restore cosmic order. The word Dashavatara derives from daśa, meaning "ten", and avatar (avatāra), roughly equivalent to "incarnation".

Various versions of the list of Vishnu's avatars exist, varying per region and tradition. Some lists mention Krishna as the eighth avatar and the Buddha as the ninth avatar, while others – such as the Yatindramatadipika, a 17th-century summary of Srivaisnava doctrine – give Balarama as the eighth avatar and Krishna as the ninth. The latter version is followed by some Vaishnavas who do not accept the Buddha as an incarnation of Vishnu. Though no list can be uncontroversially presented as standard, the "most accepted list found in Puranas and other texts is [...] Krishna, Buddha." (Note: Buddha as an avatar of Vishnu: Krishna, Buddha Printed sources: Bansal 2005, p. 27, "Vishnu Dashavatara".; Dalal 2010, p. 112, "Dashavatara". Dalal: "The standard and most accepted list found in Puranas and other texts is: [...] Rama, Krishna, Buddha, Kalki"; Doniger O'Flaherty 1994, p. 175. Doniger: "Visnu is generally said to have had ten incarnations [...] Krsna [...] the Buddha."; Flood 1996, p. 175. Flood: "...by the eight century the standard number of descent-forms in the Vaisnava Puranas is ten. These are [...] Krsna, Buddha."; Klostermaier 2007, "Visnu Avataras". Klostermaier: "The most common tradition speaks of ten such avataras [...] Krsna [...] Buddha."; Krishna 2010, pp. 28–29. Krishna: "Krishna [...] Buddha [...] There is a difference of opinion as to whether Buddha was an incarnation of Vishnu [...] The alternative then is Balarama, Rama of the plough and elder brother of Krishna, who is listed after Rama, thereby removing Buddha and making Krishna the ninth incarnation."; Leeming 2001, p. 19, "Avatar".; Lochtefeld 2001, p. 73, "Avatar". Lochtefeld: "Although there is some variation in the list of Vishnu's Avatars, the generally accepted list is as follows [...] Krishna, Buddha."; Vaswani 2017, pp. 12–14.; Wuaku 2013, p. 148.; Balarama, Buddha: Nagaswamy 2010, p. 27.; Web-sources: "avatar". Encyclopedia Britannica.; Unspecified: Holt, John Clifford (2008), The Buddhist Viṣṇu: Religious Transformation, Politics, and Culture, p.14-15; p.372 note 9 refers to four Purana's which mention the Buddha in 9th position: Varaha Purana 4.2; Matsya Purana 285.6-7; Agni Purana 49.8; Bhagavata Purana X.40.22 and I.3.; Krishna/Balarama, Buddha: The Hare Krsnas, Incarnations of the Lord - Dasavatara - Ten Primary Visnu Incarnations. The Hare Krsnas refer to the eight avatar both as Krsna and as Balarama.)

The following table summarises the position of avatars within the Dashavatara in many but not all traditions:

Position	Krishna, Buddha (common list) (Note: Leyden: Madhya Pradesh, Maharashtra.)	Balarama, Krishna (Vaishnavites) (Note: Leyden: Southern Deccan, Mysore.)	Balarama, Buddha (Note: The Hare Krsnas, Incarnations of the Lord - Dasavatara - Ten Primary Visnu Incarnations. The Hare Krsnas refer to the eight avatar both as Krsna and as Balarama.) (Note: Leyden: Rajasthan, Nepal, Northern Deccan.)	Krishna, Vithoba (Note: Maharashtra, Goa.)	Balarama, Jagannatha (Note: Mukherjee: Orissa; Leyden: West Bengal.)	Yuga
1	Matsya (fish; saves Manu Vaivasvata)					Satya Yuga
2	Kurma (turtle, tortoise)					Satya Yuga
3	Varaha (boar, wild swine)					Satya Yuga
4	Narasimha (man-lion)					Satya Yuga
5	Vamana (dwarf-god)					Treta Yuga
6	Parashurama (Brahman warrior)					Treta Yuga
7	Rama (Note: Donald J. LaRocca, Metropolitan Museum of Art, describes a katar with Rama-Krishna-Buddha, referring to Rama as Ramachandra, or alternately Balarama. Yet, Hoiberg specifically states that Rama, as an avatar of Vishnu, is Ramachandra.)					Treta Yuga
8	Krishna	Balarama	Balarama	Krishna	Balarama	Dvapara Yuga, Kali Yuga in case of Buddha
9	Buddha	Krishna	Buddha	Vithoba	Jagannatha	Dvapara Yuga, Kali Yuga in case of Buddha
10	Kalki (prophesied 10th avatar who ends the Kali Yuga)					Kali Yuga

== Royal genealogies ==
The Solar Dynasty and Lunar dynasty were two legendary principal dynasties of the Kshatriyas varna, or warrior–ruler class mentioned in the ancient Indian texts. They trace their origin to Vaivasvata Manu, who presides over the present, seventh manvatara.

According to Harivamsa, Ikshvaku was the son of Vaivasvata Manu, and the primogenitor of the Suryavamsha, or the Solar Dynasty, and was granted the kingdom of Aryavarta by his father Vaivasvata Manu. Vaivasvata Manu settled down in the Aryavarta region after he survived the Great Flood that ended the sixth mamanvatara. A. K. Mozumdar states that Manu is the one who built a city on the Sarayu (the river that his mother Sanjana was the goddess of) and called it Ayodhya, meaning the 'invincible city'. This city served as the capital of many kings from the solar dynasty and is also believed to be the birthplace of Rama.

The Lunar dynasty (IAST: Candravaṃśa) is said to be descended from moon-related deities (Soma or Chandra). According to the Shatapatha Brahmana, Pururavas was the son of Budha (himself often described as the son of Soma) and the gender-switching deity Ila (born as the daughter of Manu). Pururavas's great-grandson was Yayati, who had five sons named Yadu, Turvasu, Druhyu, Anu, and Puru. These seem to be the names of five Vedic tribes as described in the Vedas.

== Influence on classical Indian poetry ==
Many classical Indian poets derive the plots of their poetry and drama from the Itihasa. The rules of classical Indian poetics prescribe that the themes of the mahakavyas (ornate epics) and natakas (drama) should primarily be selected from the itihasa. In accordance, great mahakavyas such as Kalidasa's Raghuvamsa, Kumaradasa's Janaki-harana, Bhatti's Ravanavadha (or Bhattikavya) have drawn their themes from the Ramayana, and Bharavi's Kiratarjuniya, Magha's Sisupalavadha and Sriharsa's Naisadhiyacarita from the Mahabharata.

== Historical consciousness ==
The belief that South Asian society lacked historical consciousness until colonial times persists, as colonial writers like Robert Orme and James Mill argued that rational, factual history emerged in India only with the British Raj. They claimed pre-colonial Indian history, seen as mythic, did not meet modern standards because it was too formulaic and lacked historical context. But this notion has also been challenged. Kumkum Chatterjee, focused on a vernacular tradition of Itihasa/Purana in early modern Bengal, argued that these narratives are based on historical experiences derived from Mughal rule in Bengal and much of India during the 17th and 18th centuries. Puranas have evolved over time, constantly updated to reflect changing social conditions. They traditionally cover creation myths, cosmic cycles, genealogies, divine exploits, and royal histories, but they also include additional content like sectarian deities and social norms.

== See also ==
- Epic-Puranic royal genealogies
- Hindu units of time
- History of Hinduism
- Janapada
- List of ancient Indo-Aryan peoples and tribes
- List of Ikshvaku dynasty kings in Hinduism
- List of monarchs of Magadha
- Puru and Yadu Dynasties
- Turvasu Druhyu and Anu dynasties
- Yuga cycle

== Sources ==
Printed sources

- Bailey, Gregory (2001). Leaman, Oliver (ed.). Encyclopedia of Asian Philosophy. Routledge. ISBN 978-0415172813.
- Bansal, Sunita Pant (2005), Hindu Gods and Goddesses, New Delhi, India: Smriti Books
- Carman, John Braisted (1994), Majesty and Meekness: A Comparative Study of Contrast and Harmony in the Concept of God, Wm. B. Eerdmans Publishing
- Chatterjee, Kumkum (2008). "The Persianization of Itihasa: Performance Narratives and Mughal Political Culture in Eighteenth-Century Bengal". The Journal of Asian Studies. 67 (02). doi:10.1017/S0021911808000685. ISSN 0021-9118.
- Dalal, Roshen (2010), Hinduism: An Alphabetical Guide, Penguin Books India, ISBN 9780143414216
- Debroy, Bibek (2014). Brahmanda Purana Vol 1. Penguin Random House India Private Limited.
- Doniger O'Flaherty, Wendy (1994), Hindu Myths, Penguin Books India, ISBN 9780144000111
- Flood, Gavin D. (1996), An Introduction to Hinduism, Cambridge University Press
- Goldman, Robert P. (2018). "Augmenting the Past: Historical and Political Consciousness in Vālmīki's Uttarakāṇḍa". Studies in History. 34 (2): 182–206. doi:10.1177/0257643018772406. ISSN 0257-6430. S2CID 165668247.
- Hoiberg, Dale (2000), Students' Britannica India: M to S : (Miraj to Shastri) - Volume 4, Popular Prakashan, ISBN 9780852297605
- Klostermaier, Klaus K. (2007). A Survey of Hinduism (3rd ed.). SUNY Press. ISBN 978-0-7914-7082-4.
- Krishna, Nanditha (2009), Book of Vishnu, Penguin UK, ISBN 978-01430-6-7627
- Krishna, Nanditha (2010), The Book of Vishnu, Penguin Books India, ISBN 9780143067627
- LaRocca, Donald J. (1996), The Gods of War: Sacred Imagery and the Decoration of Arms and Armor, Metropolitan Museum of Art
- Leeming, David Adams (2001), A Dictionary of Asian Mythology
- Leyden, Rudolf von (1982), Ganjifa: The Playing Cards of India, The Victoria and Albert Museum, ISBN 978-09052-0-9173
- Lochtefeld, James G. (2001), The Illustrated Encyclopedia of Hinduism. Volume 1: A-M, The Rosen Publishing Group, Inc, ISBN 9780823931798
- Mazumdar, A.K. (2008). The Hindu history. Rupa Publications India. ISBN 978-81-86772-17-1.
- Mukherjee, Prabhat (1981), The history of medieval Vaishnavism in Orissa, Asian Educational Services, ISBN 9788120602298
- Nagaswamy, N. (2010), Mahabalipuram (Mamallapuram), Oxford University Press
- Pargiter, F. E. (Frederick Eden) (1922). Ancient Indian historical tradition. Cornell University Library. London : Oxford University Press, H. Milford.
- Samarpan (2017). Living Hinduism: Scriptures Philosophy Practices. Niyogi Books.
- Thapar, Romila (2013), The Past Before Us, Harvard University Press, ISBN 978-0-674-72651-2
- Vaswani, J.P. (2017), Dasavatara, Jaico Publishing House, ISBN 9789386867186
- Wuaku, Albert (11 July 2013). Hindu Gods in West Africa: Ghanaian Devotees of Shiva and Krishna. BRILL. ISBN 978-90-04-25571-5.

Web-sources
