= Chronology of Karnataka literature =

This is a chronology of the literature of Karnataka, India.

== Rashtrakutas ruling from Manyakheta 820-973 ==
600 Shabdavatara and vaddakathe by Durvinitha
650 Chudamani by Tambulacharya
650 Prabhruta, parapaddati by Shyamakundacharya
800 Gajashtaka by Shivakumara
850 Kavirajamarga by Amoghavarsha I
900 Gunagankiyam
900 Vaddaradhane by Shivakotiacharya
941 Vikramārjuna Vijaya (Pampa Bharata) and Adi purana By Adi Pampa
950 Shantipurana, Bhuvanaika-Ramabhyudaya and Ginaksharamaale by Ponna
954 Karnataka kumarasambhava kavyam by Asaga

== Later Gangas ruling at Talkad 900-1000 ==
978 Chavundaraya purana
990 Nagavarma I's Chhandombuddhi and karnataka kadambari.

== Western Chalukyas ruling at kalyana 973-1156 ==
993 Ranna's Ajitha-purana, Saahasabhima Vijaya (Gadaayuddha), etc.
1024 Lokopakaa by Chavundaraya
1030 Panchatantra of Durga Simha
1040 Madanatilaka by Chandraraja
1050 Dharmacharya's Jataka tilaka and chandraprhabacharita
1070 Sukamaracharita by Shantinatha
1070 Nagavarmacharya's Chandrachudamani shataka
1085 Bilhana and Vijnanesvara.

== Kalachuris ruling at kalyana 1156-1186 ==
1100 Mallinathapurana, ramachandra chairtapurana by nagachandra
1100 Kanthihampanasamashyegalu by kanti
1160 Lingayat Revival under Basava and channabasa.
1161 Hoysalas or Ballal Rajyas ruling at Dowarasamudra in

== S.Karnataka.1040-1326 ==
1195 Nagachandra's pampa ramayana.
1195 Kanti (poet) and Rajaditya (mathematician).
1098 Ramanujacharya converts Hoysala Crown prince to Vaishnavism.
1112 Nayasena's Dharmamrita.
1145 Nagavarma II's kavyavalokanam and Bhashabhushana.
1165 Harissvara's Girija-Kalyana.
1165 Raghavanka, earlier writer of Shatpadi.
1170 Nemichandra's Lilavati.
1180 Rudrabhatta's Jagannatha-vijaya.
1195 palkuruke Soma.

Transition from Ancient to medieval Kannada.

1232 Sangatya first used by Sisumayana.
1235 Andayya's Kabbigara-kava.
1245 Mallikarjuna's Sukti-sudharnava.
1260 Kesiraja’s Sabdamani-darpana.
1275 Kumudendu Ramayana.
1280 Madhvacharya preaches Dvaita doctrine.
1280 The temple at Halebid and Java building.
1310-1326 Muhammadan invasions overthrow South Indian Kingdoms.

== The Vijayanagar Kingdom, 1336-1610 ==
1350-1387 Madhvacharya and Sayana flourish.
1369 Bhimma-kavi's Basava purana.
1385 Madhura's Dharmanatha-purana.
1385 Padmananka's padmaraja purana.
1419-46 Praudha Deva Raya's reign
1419-46 Chamarasa Prabhulinga-lile.
1419-47 Kumaravyasa - Karnata Bharata Kathamanjari(Gadugina Bharata and Kumaravyasa Bharata) .
1470 Totada Siddhesvara.
1500 Kumara-Valmiki Torave Ramayana.
1500 Nijaguna-yogi Viveka-hintamani.
1509-30 krishnadevaraya's reign.
1510 Krishna-raya Bharata.
1513 Mallanarya's Bhava-chinta-ratna.
1530 Kannada Bhagavata.
1530 Kabbigara-Kaipidi.
1533 Abhinava vAdi Vidyananda's Kavya-sara.
1550 Salva-Bharata.
1557 Ratnakara-varni's Annagala-pada.
1585 Channabasavapurana by Virupakshapandita.

Transition from Medieval to Modern Kannada.

1600 Sarvajna-murti.
1604 Bhattakalanka's Karnataka Sabdanusasana.

Mysore Rajas become Independent and adopt Vaishnavism,1610.

1614 Panchabana's Bhujabali-charitre.
1646 karkala-Gommateswara charitre.
1650 Bijjala-raya-charitre.
1650 Sidhananjeshwara gururaja-charitre.
1657 Shadakshara-deva's Rajasekhara Vilasa.
1672 Santalinga-desika's stories from Bhairavesvara-kavya.
1672-1704 Chikka deva raya's reign.
1672 Chikupadhyaya and Tirumalayengar.
165 Anubhavmrritha.
1680 Mitravinda-Govinda.
160 massacre of Jangamas.
17th century — The letter ra falls out of use.
1700 Lakshmisa's Jaimini Bharata.
1700 Chandrasekhara's Ramachandra-charitre.
1708 Ananda Ramayana.
1728 laksma-Kavi bharata.
1728 Krishna lilabhududaya.
1761-99 Haidar Ali and Tippu sultan.
1838 Devachandra's Rajavali-Kathe.
