= Muhammad al-Makki =

Founder of Bukkur (1145–1246)

Muhammad bin Shuja' al-Dīn محمد بن شجاع الدين (Arabic) Sayyid Hashemite Naqvi 'Sher Sawar' 'The Lion Rider'
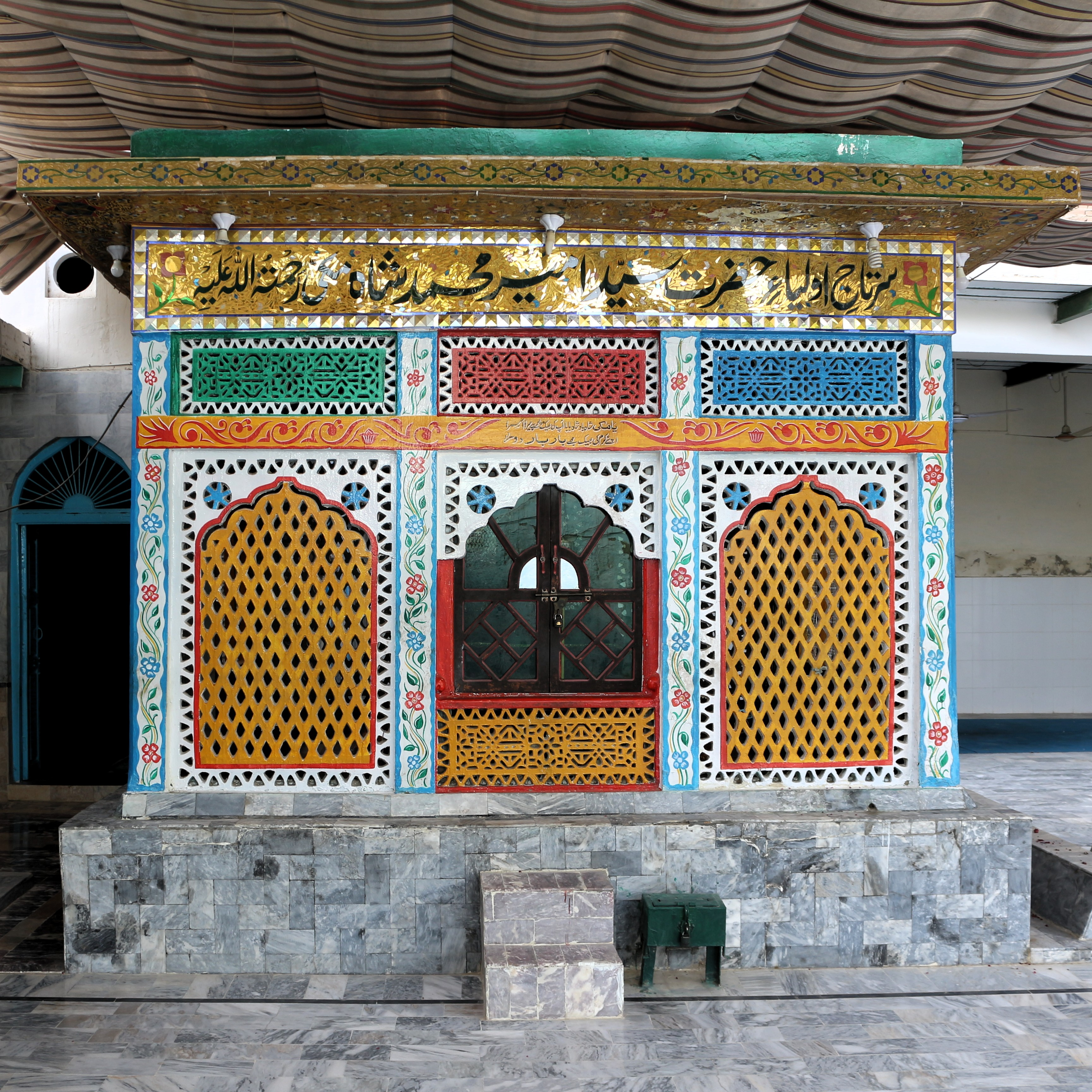
- The historical tomb of Sayyid Muhammad.
- Born: 1145; Mecca, Fatimid Caliphate
- Died: 1246 (aged 101); Sindh, Soomra dynasty
- Resting place: Sindh, Pakistan
- Title: Sayyid
- Children: Sayyid Sadruddin; Sayyid Badruddin; Sayyid Maah; Sayyid Shams
- Parent: Sayyid Muhammad Shuja' al-Dīn
- Relatives: Jalaluddin Surkh-Posh Bukhari; Shahab al-Din Abu Hafs Umar Suhrawardi

This map shows the journey Sayyid Muhammad al-Makki undertook from his birthplace to his resting place

Sayyid Muhammad ibn Shuja' al-Din al-Husayni al-Makki (Arabic: السيد محمد الحسيني المكي), 1145–1246, also known as Sayyid Mahmood Shah al-Makki (Urdu: سيد محمود مكي) was the ancestor of the Bukkuri or Bhaakri Sayyids (Urdu: بهاكري سادات), who founded Bukkur in Sindh.

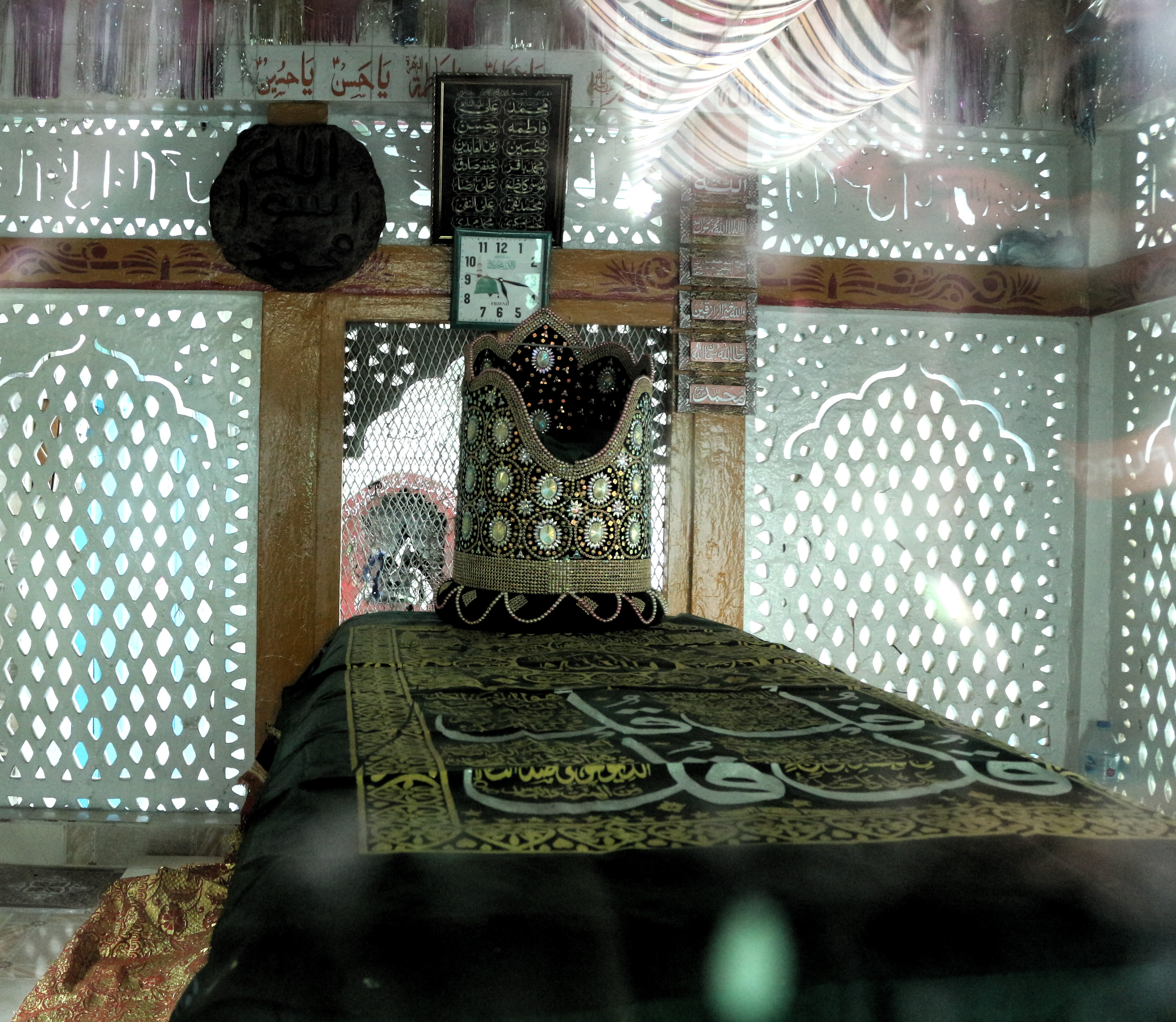
Inside View Of Shrine Muhammad Al Makki

== Birth and upbringing ==
The father of the Sayyid was Abu Ahmad Muhammad Shuja who married daughter of Abu Hafs Umar al-Suhrawardi in Baghdad. Sayyid Muhammad was born in 1145 (Islamic year of 540 AH) to the couple. Some scholars however disputed this marriage of Sayyid Muhammad Shuja to a daughter of al-Suhrawardi and have mentioned that it was Sayyid Muhammad al-Makki himself who married the daughter of al-Suhrawardi.

Sayyid Muhammad decided to leave Yemen for Sindh, claiming he saw his ancestor, the Islamic prophet Muhammad in his dream instructing him to leave for India as it awaited him.

== In Sindh ==
It is mentioned in many sources that Sayyid Muhammad al-Makki arrived in Bukkur at dawn.

Delighted at the peaceful setting and beautiful view of the sun rising, he famously and joyfully exclaimed: "God has ordained my morning in this blessed place!" (Arabic: ! جعل الله بكرتي في البقعة المباركة). Sayyid Muhammad also named this place 'Bukkur' from its former name 'Fareshta'. Upon being asked where he wanted to live by the welcoming natives he told them he wanted to live where the cowbells could be heard and the rising sun would be visible. Sayyid Muhammad al-Makki obtained a grant of land in Rohri with the condition expressed in the deed that he should cultivate the land in lieu of the military duties obligatory on all granted landowners. Due to the warlike nature of this tribe, they were entrusted by the authorities to prevent marauders and bandits from thieving and looting. Sayyid Muhammad al-Makki became a well-known saint whose preaching brought many people towards Islam. He established a centre of spiritual learning in Sindh and remained the religious figure of Sindh until the early 13th century.

== Death ==
Muhammad al-Makki died at the age of 101 in 1246 AD and 644 AH. He was buried in the fort of Arak between Sukkur and Bukkur His shrine is located near Deputy Commissioner Office Sukkur. Location of Shrine Of Muhammad Al Makki In Sukkur

== Descendants ==
=== Makhdoom Muhammad Badruddin Bhaakri ===
His descendants include Sayyid Muhammad Mahdi who was born from the daughter of Alauddin Khalji, Sayyid Sa'adullah and Waris Shah, the author of Heer Ranjha, the famous romantic story.

=== Sayyid Sadruddin al-Khatib ===
The saint Sayyid Sadruddin, the son of Sayyid Muhammad Shah al-Makki was born in 1204 in Bukkur. His influence spread all around the Indian Sub-Continent and was well known for his spirituality. He spent most of his life travelling and seeking knowledge from other parts of the world. He died in 1270 and is buried on Bukkur Island.

Sayyid Sadruddin's son Ali Badruddin had many sons including Sayyid Murtadha also known as Shaban ul Millat, whose descendants are found mostly in Allahabad in India. From the descendants of Sayyid Ali Badruddin comes the author of Manba Al-Ansab, Sayyid Muin Al-Haqq and many other famous historical personalities. Other sons of Sayyid Ali Badruddin are Sayyid Daulat Ahmad, Sayyid Nazamuddin, Sayyid Ruknuddin and Sayyid Muhyuddin.
