= Indian epic poetry =

Epic poetry of the Indian subcontinent

Indian epic poetry is the epic poetry written in the Indian subcontinent, traditionally called Kavya (IAST: Kāvyá). The Ramayana and the Mahabharata, which were originally composed in Sanskrit and later translated into many other Indian languages, and the Five Great Epics of Tamil literature and Sangam literature are some of the oldest surviving epic poems ever written.

== List of longest epics ==
| Image(s) | Length (lines) | Original title(s) | Romanization | Literal meaning(s) | Original language(s) | Place(s) of origin | Author | Genre | Note(s) |
|---|---|---|---|---|---|---|---|---|---|
| | 1,00,000 couplets (2,00,000 lines) | महाभारतम् | Mahabharatam | The Great Bharatam | Sanskrit | Indian subcontinent | Vyasa | Sanskrit literature, Hinduism | |
| | 24,000 couplets (48,000 lines) | रामायणम् | Ramayanam | Rama’s Journey or Rama's progress | Sanskrit | Indian subcontinent | Valmiki | Sanskrit literature, Hinduism | |
| | 39,000 lines | ꯈꯝꯕ ꯊꯣꯏꯕꯤ ꯁꯩꯔꯦꯡ | Khamba Thoibi Sheireng | Poem on Khamba and Thoibi | Meitei language (officially called "Manipuri") | Manipur Kingdom | Hijam Anganghal | Epic cycles of incarnations in Moirang, Meitei literature | |
| | 21,507 | ఆంధ్ర మహాభారతం | Andhra Mahabharatam | The Telugu Great Bharatam | Telugu language | Eastern Chalukyas | Kavitrayam | Telugu literature, Hinduism | |
| | 5,730 | சிலப்பதிகாரம் | Cilappatikaram | The Tale of an Anklet | Tamil language | Tamilakam | Ilango Adigal | Sangam literature | |
| | 4,861 | மணிமேகலை | Manimekalai | Jewelled Belt, Girdle of Gems | Tamil language | Tamilakam | Chithalai Chathanar | Sangam literature, Buddhism | |
| | 3,145 | சீவக சிந்தாமணி | Cīvaka Cintāmaṇi | Jivaka, the Fabulous Gem | Tamil language | Tamilakam | Tiruttakkatēvar | Sangam literature, Jainism | |

== Hindi epics ==
In modern Hindi literature, Kamayani by Jaishankar Prasad has attained the status of an epic. The narrative of Kamayani is based on a popular mythological story, first mentioned in Satapatha Brahmana. It is a story of the great flood and the central characters of the epic poem are Manu (a male) and Shraddha (a female). Manu is representative of the human psyche and Shradha represents love. Another female character is Ida, who represents rationality. Some critics surmise that the three lead characters of Kamayani symbolize a synthesis of knowledge, action and desires in human life. It inspires humans to live a life based on "karm" and not on fortunes.

Apart from Kamayani, Saketa (1932) by Maithili Sharan Gupt, Kurukshetra (Epic Poetry) (1946), Rashmirathi (1952) and Urvashi (1961) by Ramdhari Singh 'Dinkar' have attained the status of epic poetry.

Likewise Lalita Ke Aansoo by Krant M. L. Verma (1978) narrates the tragic story about the death of Lal Bahadur Shastri through his wife Lalita Shastri.

== Kannada epics ==
Kannada epic poetry mainly consists of Jain religious literature and Lingayat literature. Asaga wrote Vardhaman Charitra, an epic which runs in 18 cantos, in 853 CE, the first Sanskrit biography of the 24th and last tirthankara of Jainism, Mahavira, though his Kannada-language version of Kalidasa's epic poem, Kumārasambhava, Karnataka Kumarasambhava Kavya is lost. The most famous poet from this period is Pampa (902–975 CE), one of the most famous writers in the Kannada language. His Vikramarjuna Vijaya (also called the Pampabharatha) is hailed as a classic even to this day. With this and his other important work Ādi purāṇa he set a trend of poetic excellence for the Kannada poets of the future. The former work is an adaptation of the celebrated Mahabharata, and is the first such adaptation in Kannada. Noted for the strong human bent and the dignified style in his writing, Pampa has been one of the most influential writers in Kannada. He is identified as Adikavi "first poet". It is only in Kannada that we have a Ramayana and a Mahabharata based on the Jain tradition in addition to those based on Brahmanical tradition.

Shivakotiacharya was the first writer in prose style. His work Vaddaradhane is dated to 900 CE. Sri Ponna (939–966 CE) is also an important writer from the same period, with Shanti Purana as his magnum opus. Another major writer of the period is Ranna (949-? CE). His most famous works are the Jain religious work Ajita Tirthankara Purana and the Gada Yuddha, a birds' eye view of the Mahabharata set in the last day of the battle of Kurukshetra and relating the story of the Mahabharata through a series of flashbacks. Structurally, the poetry in this period is in the Champu style, essentially poetry interspersed with lyrical prose.

The Siribhoovalaya is a unique work of multilingual Kannada literature written by Kumudendu Muni, a Jain monk. The work is unique in that it does not employ letters, but is composed entirely in Kannada numerals. The Saangathya metre of Kannada poetry is employed in the work. It uses numerals 1 through 64 and employs various patterns or bandhas in a frame of 729 (27×27) squares to represent letters in nearly 18 scripts and over 700 languages. Some of the patterns used include the Chakrabandha, Hamsabandha, Varapadmabandha, Sagarabandha, Sarasabandha, Kruanchabandha, Mayurabandha, Ramapadabandha, and Nakhabandha. As each of these patterns are identified and decoded, the contents can be read. The work is said to have around 600,000 verses, nearly six times as big as the ancient Indian epic Mahabharata.

The Prabhulingaleele, Basava purana, Channabasavapurana and Basavarajavijaya are a few of the Lingayat epics.

== Meitei epics ==
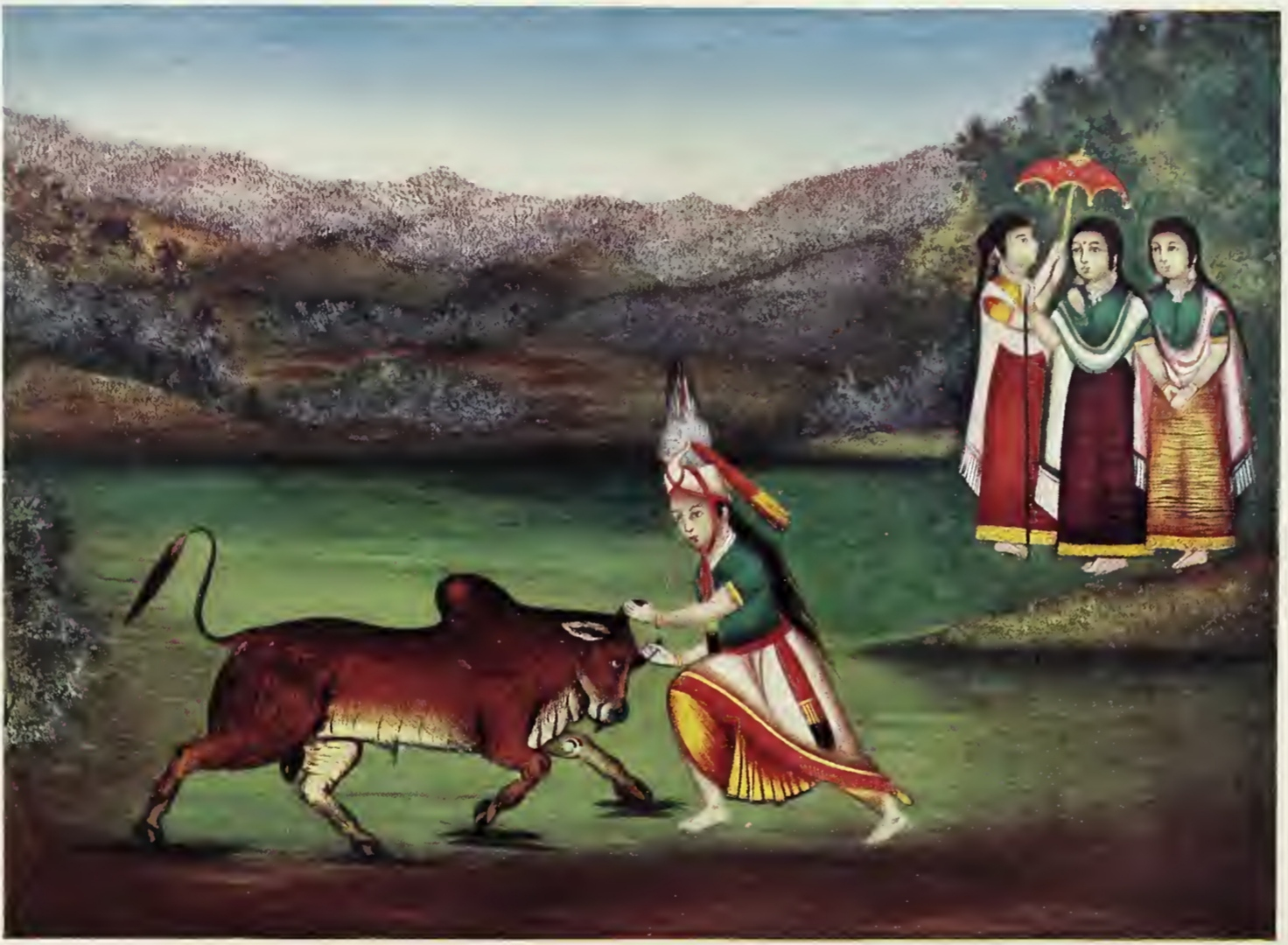
The Capture of the wild Kao (bull) by Khamba

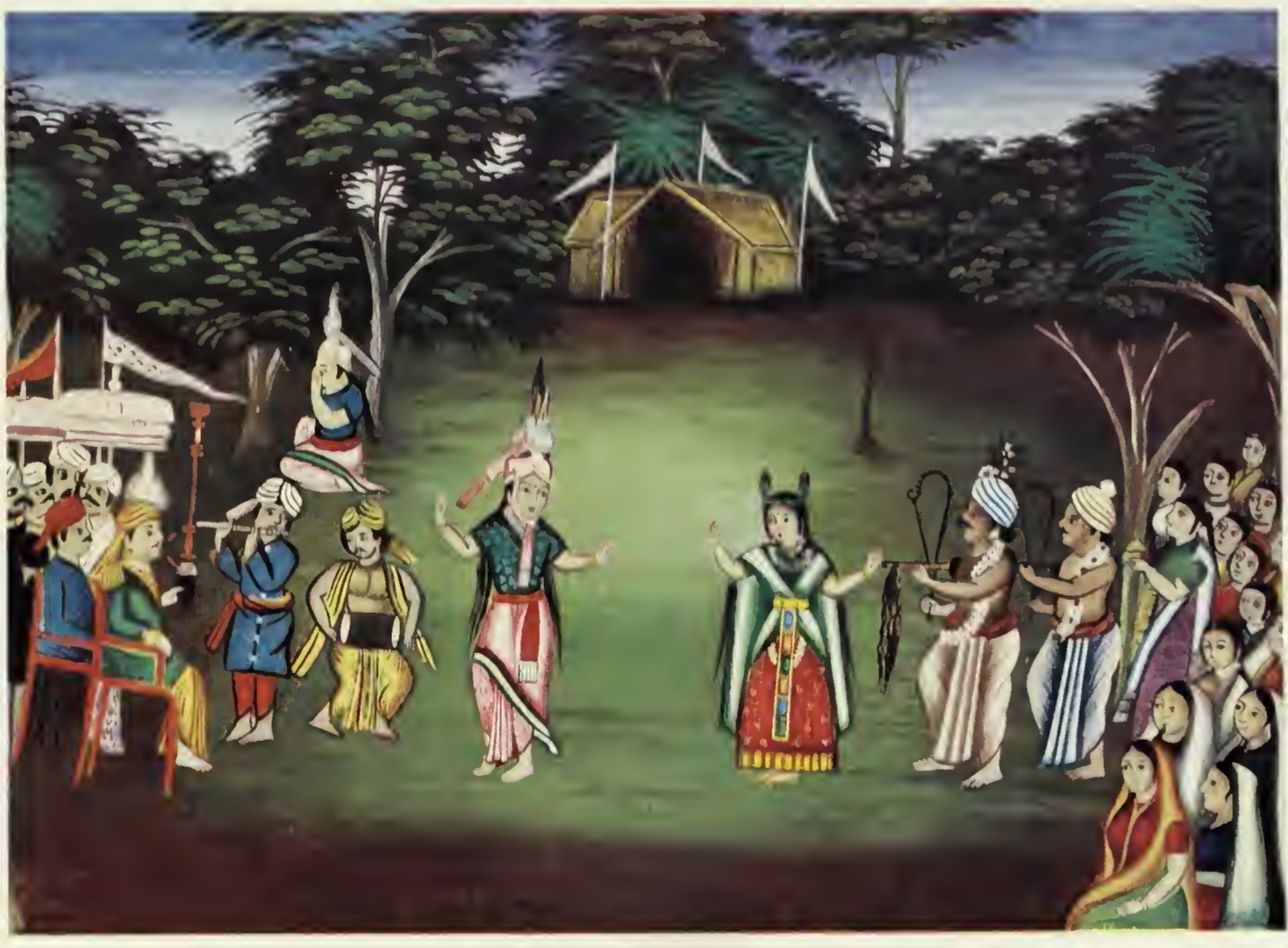
The Dance before the King by Khamba and princess Thoibi

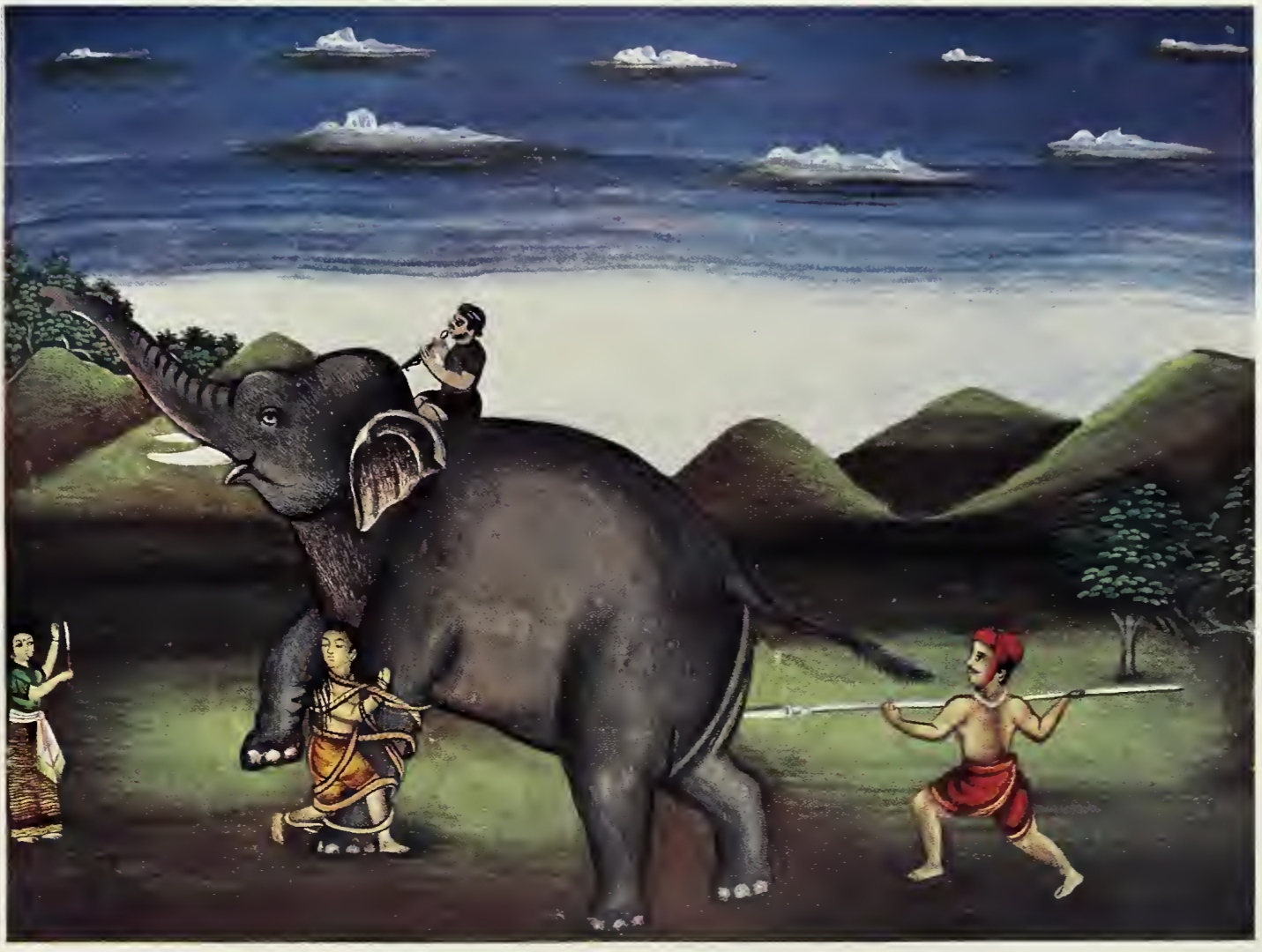
The Torture of Khamba by the Elephant

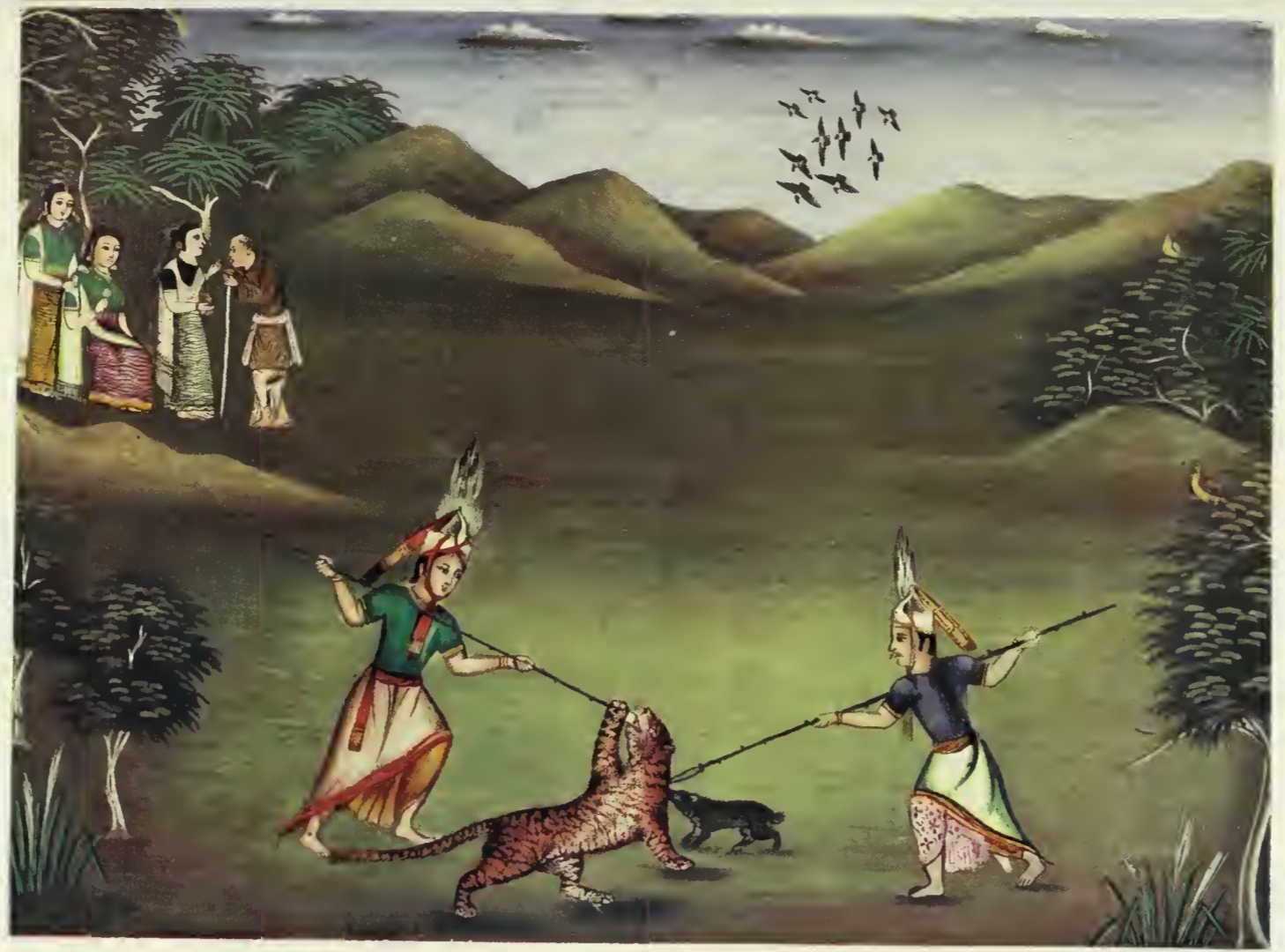
The Tiger Hunt by Khamba and his rival Nongban Kongyamba

Scenes from the Khamba Thoibi epic legend, which is the seventh and the last part of the Epic cycles of incarnations.

Meitei language (officially known as Manipuri language), an old Sino-Tibetan language, originated from Ancient Kangleipak (early Manipur) in North East India, is a language with a rich granary of epic poetries, mostly written in archaic version of the Meitei script in Puyas, the Meitei texts.

The sagas of the seven epic cycles of incarnations of the two divine lovers were originated from the shoreline Moirang around the Loktak lake in Manipur. Their stories were composed in both prose and poetry, among which the ballad versions were usually sung by the minstrels, playing Pena (musical instrument) since ancient times.

The Khamba Thoibi Sheireng (based on the story of Khamba and Thoibi) is regarded as the greatest of all the Meitei epics. It is regarded as the national epic of the Manipuris. It consists of approximately 39,000 verses. The epic poetry has fifteen chapters (Meitei: Pandup) and ninety two sections (Meitei: Taangkak). It is based on the legendary love story of Khuman Khamba, an orphan man, and Thoibi, the then princess of Moirang. Though the legend existed in the immortal songs of the Meitei balladeers, it was composed in a proper poetic version by Hijam Anganghal in 1940.

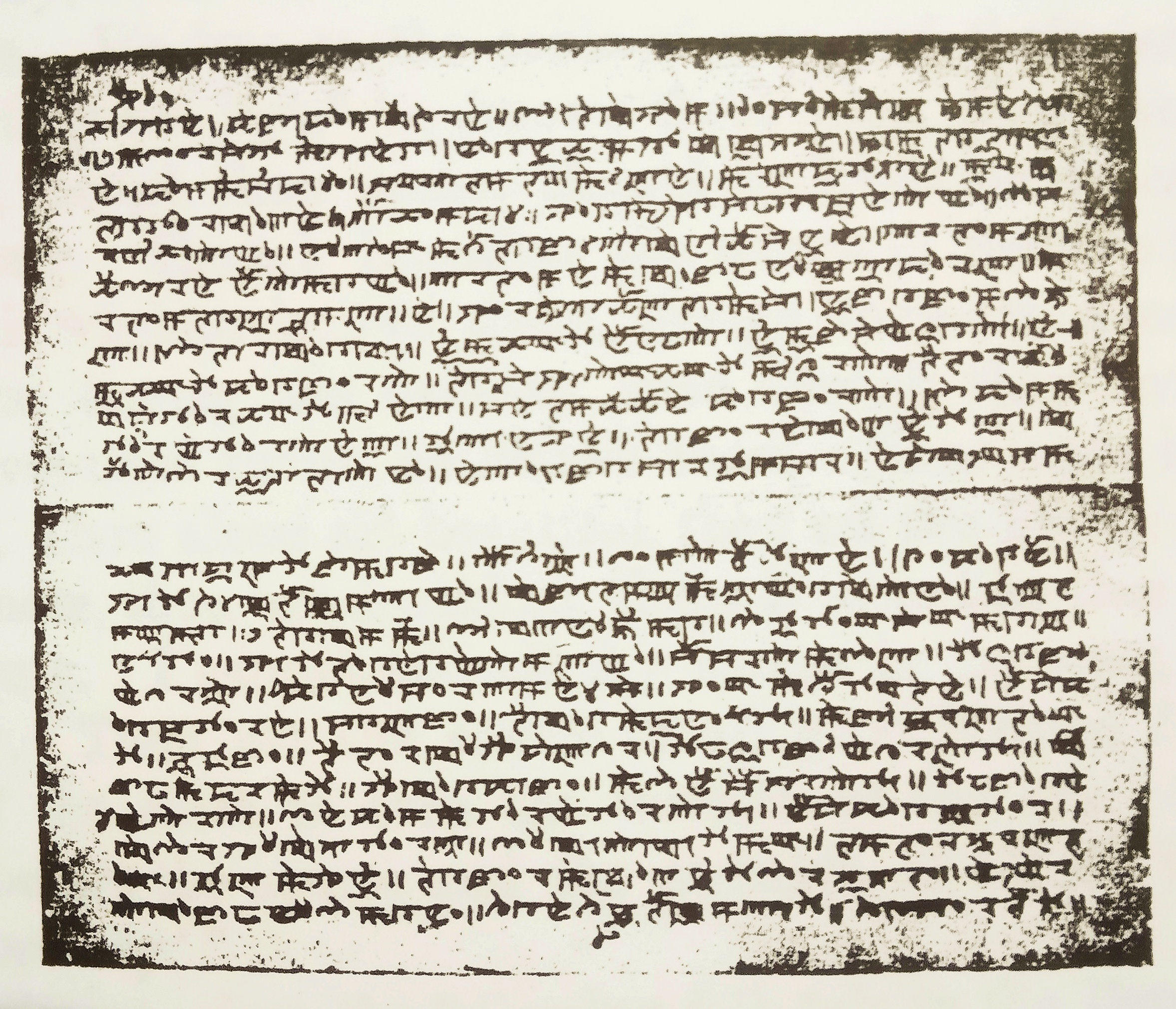
The Numit Kappa, a Classical Meitei epic text written during the 1st century, based on ancient Meitei mythology and religion (Sanamahism)

The Numit Kappa, literally meaning "Shooting at the Sun" in Meitei, is a 1st-century BC Meitei epic, based on the story of a hero named Khwai Nungjeng Piba, who shoots one of the two shining suns in the sky, to create the night.

The Ougri is the collection of musical epic poetries, associated with religious themes, originated during the reign of King Nongda Lairen Pakhangba in 33 AD. Other epics include Shingel Indu by Hijam Anganghal, Khongjom Tirtha by Nilabir Sharma, Chingoi Baruni by Gokul Shastri, Kansa Vadha by A. Dorendrajit, and Vasudeva Mahakavya by Chingangbam Kalachand. However, the Sanskrit epics such as the Mahabharata and the Ramayana were also translated into Meitei language in the medieval times. Other translated epic works include the Meghnad Badh Kavya, the Bhagavad Gita, and the Ashtakam.

== Assamese epics ==
In 14th century Madhav Kandali dubbed the epic Ramayana as Saptakanda Ramayana. In chronology, among vernacular translations of the original Sanskrit, Kandali's Ramayana comes after Kamban's (Tamil, 12th century)and Gona Budda Reddy's ( Telugu: Ranganath Ramayanamu) and ahead of Kirttivas' (Bengali, 15th century), Tulsidas' (Awadhi, 16th century), Balaram Das' (Oriya) etc. Thus it becomes the first rendition of the Ramayana into an Indo-Aryan language in the Indian subcontinent.

== Sanskrit epics ==
The ancient Sanskrit epics the Ramayana and Mahabharata comprise together the Itihāsa (lit. 'writer has himself witnessed the story') or Mahākāvya ("Great Compositions"), a canon of Hindu scripture. The epic form prevailed and verse remained, until very recently, the preferred form of Hindu literary works. Indian culture readily lent itself to a literary tradition that abounded in epic poetry and literature. The Puranas, a massive collection of verse-form histories of India's many Hindu gods and goddesses, followed in this tradition. Itihāsa and Puranas are mentioned in the Atharva Veda and referred to as the fifth Veda.

The language of these texts, termed Epic Sanskrit, constitutes the earliest phase of Classical Sanskrit, following the latest stage of Vedic Sanskrit found in the Shrauta Sutras. The Suparṇākhyāna, a late Vedic poem considered to be among the "earliest traces of epic poetry in India," is an older, shorter precursor to the expanded legend of Garuda that is included within the Mahābhārata.

The Buddhist kavi Aśvaghoṣa wrote two epics and one drama. He lived in the 1st-2nd century. He wrote a biography of the Buddha, titled Buddhacarita. His second epic is called Saundarananda and tells the story of the conversion of Nanda, the younger brother of the Buddha. The play he wrote is called Śariputraprakaraṇa, but of this play only a few fragments remained.

The famous poet and playwright Kālidāsa also wrote two epics: Raghuvamsha (The Dynasty of Raghu) and Kumarasambhava (The Birth of Kumar Kartikeya). Other classical Sanskrit epics are the Slaying of Śiśupāla Śiśupālavadha of Māgha, Arjuna and the Mountain Man Kirātārjunīya of Bhāravi, the Adventures of the Prince of Nishadha Naiṣadhacarita of Śrīharṣa and Bhaṭṭi's Poem Bhaṭṭikāvya of Bhaṭṭi.

== Tamil epics ==
The post-sangam period (2nd century-6th century) saw many great Tamil epics being written, including Cilappatikaram (or Silappadhikaram), Manimekalai, Civaka Cintamani, Valayapathi and Kundalakesi. Out of the five, Manimekalai and Kundalakesi are Buddhist religious works, Civaka Cintamani and Valayapathi are Tamil Jain works and Silappatikaram has a neutral religious view. They were written over a period of 1st century CE to 10th century CE and act as the historical evidence of social, religious, cultural and academic life of people during the era they were created. Civaka Cintamani introduced long verses called virutha pa in Tamil literature, while Silappatikaram used akaval meter (monologue), a style adopted from Sangam literature.

Later, during the Chola period, Kamban (12th century) wrote what is considered one of the greatest Tamil epics — the Kamba Ramayanam of Kamban, based on the Valmiki Ramayana. The Thiruthondat Puranam (or Periya Puranam) of Chekkizhar is the great Tamil epic of the Shaiva Bhakti saints and is part of the religious scripture of Tamil Nadu's majority Shaivites.

== Telugu epics ==
Most of the Telugu epics are about Hinduism.

The first known Telugu epic was the Andhra Mahabharatam written by the Kavitrayam (11th-14th centuries)

Other main Telugu epics are the Ranganatha Ramayanamu, Basava Purana, and the Amuktamalyada
