= Ali Murtaza Bayabani =

- Born: Ali Murtaza Bayabani; 1261; 24 Shaban 630 AH; Bhakkar, Sind
- Died: 26 October or 5 November 1359 (aged 97–98); 3 or 13 Dhul Hijjah 760 AH
- Resting place: Jhusi, India
- Relatives: Sayyid Taqiuddin Muhammad (son)

Ali Murtaza Bayabani (1261 – 1359), also known as Mahi-Shaban i Bayabani, was a Sufi born at Bhakkar, Sind in 1261 AD. He was a Bhaakri Syed. He traveled at the age of thirty to Multan, whence he moved successively to Bihar, Shaikhpura and finally to the neighbourhood of Allahabad, where large numbers of people became his followers. He died on 26 October or 5 Nov 1359 AD at Jhunsi where his shrine is located.

== Early life ==
Ali Murtaza Bayabani was born at Bhakkar to Badruddin Badr-e-Alam. In his late twenties he started his journey in search of spiritual master and went to Multan where he met with Shams-ud-Din and became his disciple. He instructed Bayabani to meet Rukn-e-Alam.

He stayed in the service of Rukn-e-Alam for two years. Later, he departed from Multan and went to Bihar where he became a Sufi of Soharwardi order. He passed on 3 or 13 Dhul Hijjah 760/ 26 October or 5 November 1359. His Shrine is located in Jhunsi Allahabad.
