= Manba al-Ansab =

Historical document about topics including the genealogy

The Source of Genealogy or Manba Al-Ansāb (Arabic: منبع الانساب | Persian: منبع انساب) is a historical document outlining various topics including the genealogy of the Sayyids of Bukkur (Urdu بھاکری سادات) and Sufism written by Sayyid Muīn Al-Haqq around 1426 AD and the Islamic year 830. Sayyid Muīn is a notable Sayyid who descends from the Islamic prophet, Muhammad through his descendant, Ali al-Hadi. The work was extended by a lineal sixth degree descendant of Sayyid Muīn. Sayyid Ali Ghazanfar alias Jārullah added more information other Sayyid ancestries and other Sufi orders. Sayyid Muīn lived in India where the book was originally written in Persian and was later translated into Urdu. Manba Al-Ansāb can also be found in the manuscript form in The British Library and Allahabad, India.

== Background ==
Sayyid Muīn lived in Jhusi and belonged to the Suhrawardiyya Sufi order. He would often spend his time travelling and learning. His ancestors originally came from Bukkur in Sindh, which was the home of Sayyids of Bukkur and settled in Jhusi where they established a centre for the propagation of Islam. In the course of his wanderings, he set out to ascertain and authenticate his ancestry which connected to Ali al-Hadi. He went to Bukkur, the home of his ancestors and obtained a certificate of his pedigree from relatives who are from the same line of descent. Sayyid Muīn was shown a family tree of ancestry which was brought from Mashhad in Iran to Sindh by Sayyid Muhammad Al-Makki, the common ancestor of all Bukkuri /Bhakri Sayyids(Urdu: بهاكري سادات), on which he based this book. He outlined the essentials of Sufism and also made an account of the Sayyids of Bukkur and Allahabad.

== Content ==
The book is divided into eleven chapters:

1) Genealogy of Muhammad

2) Genealogy of the Prophets

3) History of Muhammad, The Twelve Imams and The Fourteen Infallibles

4) Account of the Sayyids of Bukkur and elsewhere

5) Account of various Sufi orders

6) Rules, observances and the prayers of Sufi

7) Doctrines of Philosophers and the Sufi regarding the soul

8) Hadith relating to Sufism

9) The meaning of the words, "Āmantu Billāh" (Arabic:آمنت بالله)

10) Eulogies on The Twelve Imams

11) The origin and destiny of man
