= Basavarajavijaya =

Basavarajavijaya (ಬಸವರಾಜ ವಿಜಯ) also known as Vrushabhendra Vijaya (ವೃಷಭೇನ್ದ್ರ ವಿಜಯ) was written by Shadaksharadeva in the 17th century. The book narrates the life story of Basavanna and the sharanas.

The book is written in the champu style, and it is the last of the champu tradition started by Pampa.
