= Pratishthanpur =

Pratishthanpur or Pratishthanpuram was capital of the Lunar Dynasty (Chandra Vanshi or Somavanshi), at present Jhusi, Prayagraj. This archeological site has yielded a carbon 14 dating of 7100 BC for its Neolithic levels. Today it lies on the eastern side of Prayagraj, across the river Ganges and connected to the city by the Shastri Bridge, and is considered an important part of the history of Prayagraj or Prayag, city's former name.

== History ==
Pratishthana was the most important locality of Prayag and it was founded by King Ila and was the capital of Pururavas and other kings of Lunar Dynasty. Once belonging to the rulers of Maurya, Shunga, Kushana and Gupta period, the ancient Pratishthana has lost its identity to the modernity of Jhunsi.

The only evidence related to this historical fact is still visible in the shape of high mounds in Jhunsi. Surprisingly, these high mounds have further added to the significance of the city as the articles excavated from here belong to the 6th century BC and antiquities belonging to five cultural phases ranging from chalcolithic to early medieval period have been found here.

As per the historians and the pre NBP ware deposit the site of Kumbh Mela is marked at this place as the earliest culture represented at the site. Early layer of this deposit has yielded iron objects. Some pottery items and antiquities are similar to those found at different chalcolithic sites in UP, Bihar and Northern Vindhyas.

=== Destruction ===
It is also said that the town was destroyed in an earthquake in CE 1359 as a result of the invocations of saint Ali Murtaza. The historian Dr. D. P. Dubey These traditions and the etymological meaning of the name Jhunsi possibly indicate to the destruction and burning of the site by the Muslim invaders in the 13th century CE. The traditions relating to the scattering of Brahmana and Kshatriya clans abandoning their homes in Jhunsi and emigrating to distant places during the medieval period lend colour to this theory.

There is also the historical and sacred Samudrakoop here which has its own story. "It is known as Samudrakoop since it belongs to the period of Samudragupta. In fact five such wells are found in Ujjain, Mathura, Prayag (Prayagraj), Varanasi and Patalpur (Pataliputra or Patna). It was dumped with garbage once but the efforts of a sage Dayaram brought its historical importance to limelight."

== Archaeology ==
From the pre-Northern Black Polished Ware (NBP Ware) period (ca. 700 BC–200 BC) to the Gupta period there had been continuous settlement at the site. However, there appears to be a cultural gap between the end of Gupta period and the beginning of early medieval period. "There is every likelihood that the site may show up no gap at all when excavated extensively. This possibility is based on the strategic location of the site itself which, by virtue of the same reason, would have never been abandoned after having been once occupied. The excavations in the area only hint at the above fact."

The ruins of ancient Pratishthana which are represented by the high mounds of Jhunsi on the eastern bank of the Ganges are spread over an area of about four square miles. Research on lost heritage of Prayagraj under Indian National Trust for Art and Cultural Heritage (INTACH) suggests that the site is slowly losing its identity on account of continuous erosion of the Ganges river. "The high mound, which belong to Kushana period, has few bricks exposed right now".

== In literature ==
Kalidasa too mentions about Pratishthana in his Sanskrit drama Vikramōrvaśīyam. He has given an imaginary account of this palace of Pururavas which was magnificent. Various myths are also associated with this site. An inscription of Trilochanapala, the Pratihara king, was discovered from the site in 1830.

In his book, VN Pandey mentions that the naming of Jhunsi too has a legend associated with it. It was once ruled by Har-bonga, an imbecile and foolish king in whose reign chaos prevailed everywhere. When the cup of his inequity was full there was an upheaval on the earth and the capital Pratishthana was turned upside down hence now known as 'Ulta Qila'.

There was conflagration which completed the destruction of the city and the ruins went by the name of Jhunsi, a burnt town from the Hindi root 'jhulasna'.

Ramdhari Singh Dinakar wrote "Urvashi", a poem which narrated the story of love between Urvashi, a celestial nymph, and Pururava, the king of Pratishthanpur.

== Ulta Kila ==
It is said that once the saint Ali Mur-taza (maqdoom sahab) was invited on the lunch by the king haribong who lived on this kila. King Haribong gave him the wrong things to eat. This made Saint Ali-Murtaza angry and he ordered the planet Mars (named Mirrikh in Arabic) to fall on that kila, and as the order the star fell on the kila and the whole kila burnt out and this gave it the name, ulta kila and also this was the origin of the name jhuns (which means burnt). Kamayani is written by Jai Shankar Prasad based on battle between Pururava and Ila and later they had fierce love, in the backdrop of Pratishthanpur. Andher Nagari chaupat Raja, Take ser bhaji, Take ser khaja, a play by Bhartendu Harishchandra.

== See also ==
- Places of interest in Allahabad
- Places of interest in Prayagraj
