= Rangachar Narayana Iyengar =

Indian engineer

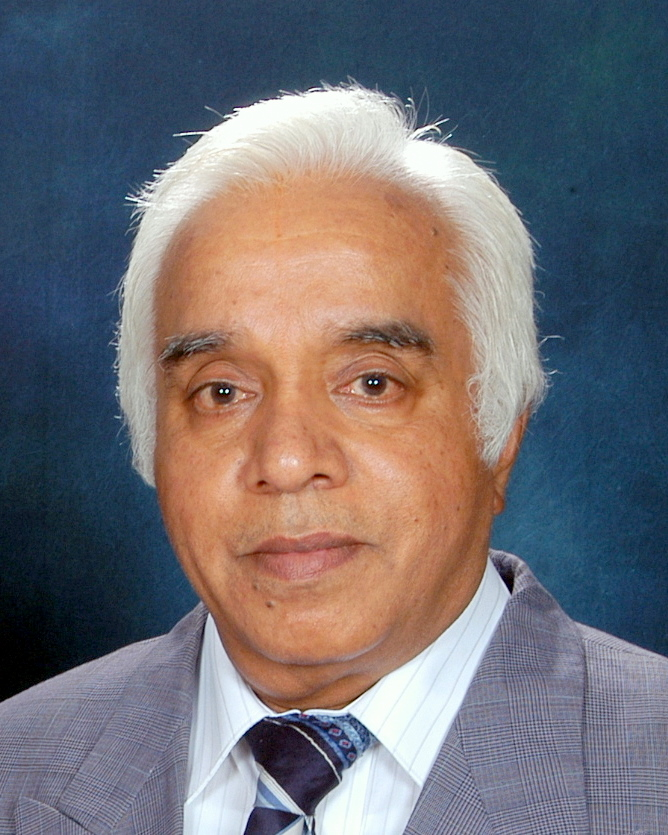
- R.N. Iyengar
- Born: 2 June 1943 (age 83); Mysore, British India
- Citizenship: India
- Education: Indian Institute of Science (Ph.D.); Indian Institute of Science (M.Sc.(Engg.))
- Scientific career
- Fields: disaster mitigation, structural dynamics, random vibration, nonlinear systems, earthquake engineering, railway track-dynamics, rainfall modeling, history of science, archeo-astronomy
- Workplaces: Indian Institute of Science, Bangalore, India; Central Building Research Institute, Roorkee, India
- Doctoral advisor: K.T.S. Iyengar

Rangachar Narayana Iyengar (born 2 June 1943), also known as RNI, is a civil engineer and professor from India. He was with the Indian Institute of Science, Bangalore for about four decades. He has been the director of Central Building Research Institute, Roorkee (1994–2000). He is currently a Raja Ramanna Fellow, and the Director for the Center for Ancient History and Culture (CAHC) at the Jain University, Bangalore. He also setup the Center for Disaster Mitigation (CDM) at the Jain University.

He has in the past been the editor of 'SADHANA' published by the Indian Academy of Sciences, Bangalore. Apart from his contributions to Engineering, he is also widely recognized for his work in History of Science.

He is a fellow of Indian Academy of Sciences, Indian National Academy of Engineering and National Academy of Sciences, India. He was awarded the Alexander von Humboldt Fellowship (Senior 1978–80, 1992 and 1997). He is the recipient of the Sir M Visvesvaraya award (Government of Karnataka 1996) for senior scientists for lifetime contributions to science and technology. He has held visiting positions at the Purdue University, Brooklyn Polytechnic, New York and Distinguished Schimdt Visiting Chair, Florida Atlantic University (1995). He has led field investigations after the Khilari (1993), Chamoli (1999) and Kutch (2001) earthquakes. He has been a consultant to various industries and research & development organizations in India including NPC, IGCAR, DRDO, RDSO, BHEL and Kerala State Government.

== Career ==
R N Iyengar joined the Indian Institute of Science (IISc), Bangalore as Masters student and obtained his M.Sc. (Engineering) (1966) and PhD (1970) from IISc. His PhD thesis on stochastic modeling of earthquake loads was the first doctoral thesis in the country in the area of random vibrations. He joined IISc as a faculty member in 1969 and became a professor in 1986. Until his retirement, he was the KSIIDC Chair Professor in the Department of Civil Engineering and also Professor in Center for Atmospheric and Oceanic Sciences at the Indian Institute of Science, Bangalore.

After his retirement from IISc, he joined Jain University and was instrumental in setting up the UL-Jain Fire Laboratory (UL-JFL). The UL-JFL is a state-of-art engineering laboratory devoted to fire safety education and research that will promote industry academia interaction, contributing to mitigation of fire hazard in the Indian habitat.

Since 2012, he is the Director of the Center for Ancient History and Culture (CAHC) at the university, working on research in the area of history of science in India.

== Research ==
Professor Iyengar's fields of expertise have encompassed the areas of structural dynamics, random vibrations, earthquake engineering, disaster mitigation, railway track dynamics, rainfall modeling and history of science. In history of science, his present work area, he has worked in historical records of Natural Disasters and Rainfall, Archaeo Astronomy and history of music. He has inspired several generations of students in the above areas of research. He has supervised more than 13 PhD students.

== Contributions to the history of science ==
Besides his distinguished contributions as a structural engineer, he has contributed immensely to the field of history of science, especially to Pre-Siddantic Indian Astronomy. Some of the problems he has studied are as follows.

- Earthquake history of India in medieval times (1999)
- Earthquakes in ancient India (1999)
- Historicity of celestial observations of Mahabharata (2003)
- Profile of a natural disaster in ancient Sanskrit literature (2004)
- Description of rainfall variability in Brhatsamhita of Varâha-mihira (2004)
- On Some Comet Observations in Ancient India (2005)
- Eclipse Period Number 3339 in the Rgveda (2005)
- Some Celestial Observations Associated with Krsna-Lore (2006)
- Archaic Astronomy of Parasara and Vrddha Garga (2008)
- Geographical location of Vedic Irina in Southern Rajasthan-Discussion (2008)

In his book Parasharatantra, R.N Iyengar has reconstructed the original text of Parashara, which is contained as quotations in the works of later authors. With modern astronomical techniques, Iyengar has shown that Parashara knew planets and their periods along with 26 comets and their intervals; he gave the correct observational condition for the heliacal visibility and set of star Canopus (Agastya). Parashara knew that lunar eclipses can occur at 6 months interval. He denoted total penumbral eclipse as 'Nirodha'.

== Publications ==
He has published nearly 100 papers in leading refereed journals across the globe.

- List of papers on Google Scholar.
- Books authored by Prof. RNI on Amazon.

== Honors and distinctions ==
- Fellow, Indian Academy of Sciences, Bangalore.
- Fellow, Indian National Academy of Engineering, New Delhi.
- Fellow, National Academy of Sciences, Allahabad.
- Member, Asia-Pacific Academy of Materials.
- Member, European Academy of Sciences, Brussels
- Alexander Von Humboldt Fellowship (Senior), Germany 1978 to 80, 1992, 1997
- First Prize of the Railway Board for the paper "Identification of Damping in Railway Vehicles under Running Condition" 1989–90.
- National Representative, General Assembly of IUTAM 1987-92
- Plenary Speaker GAMM Conference, on Applied Mechanics, Leipzig, Germany, 1992
- Distinguished Schmidt Visiting Chair, Florida Atlantic University, Boca Raton, U.S.A. 1995,
- Shelter Award by the Shelter Promotion Council of India, Calcutta, 1996
- Sir M. Visvesvaraya Award for Senior Scientists for lifetime Contribution to Science and Technology; Govt. of Karnataka, 1996.
- Narayanan Memorial lecture Award, Acoustical Society India, 1996.
- 18th ISET Annual Lecture Indian Society of Earthquake Technology, 1997
- A.K. Sen Memorial Lecture Award, IIT, Kharagpur, 1998.
- Chairman and Organizer IUTAM Symposium on "Nonlinearity and Stochastic Structural Dynamics", 4–8 January 1999,? IIT? Madras.
- Invited Sectional Lecture, ICTAM, Chicago, USA. August 2000,
- Swamy Rao Memorial Lecture Award, JNTU, Kakinada, 2001.
- NRDC-Technology Day Award for "Pollution Control Device for Brick Kilns" (Shared), 2001
- Member, editorial board, Journal of Probabilistic Engineering Mechanics, Elsevier Applied Sciences, U.K.(1994–2004)
- Member, editorial board, Sadhana, Indian Academy of Sciences, Bangalore.
- Member, editorial board, Journal of Indian Soc. of Earthquake Technology.
- Associate editor, Journal of Indian Institute of Science, Bangalore (1987–92).
- Editor-in-chief, Sadhana-Journal of Engineering Science, Indian Academy of Sciences, Bangalore.

== In media ==
- The Indian Express: ICHR approves first project to map ancient India’s scientific achievements
- The Hindu: Preparing for a big earthquake
- The Hindu: `Strategy to reduce quake-associated damage must'
- The Hindu: 'Tremors cause panic in KGF'
- The Hindu: 'Kashmir earthquake: history repeats itself'
- Interview with R N Iyengar, Director, CBRI, Roorkee, India
- The Hindu Business Line: 'Building successes'
- Outlook: 'A Hundred Ground Zeroes'
- American Scientist: 'Kashmir Valley Megaearthquakes'

== See also ==
- List of famous Iyengars

== Bibliography ==
- Iyengar, R. N. (2013), Parasharatantra (1st ed.), Jain University Press (Bangalore), ISBN 978-81-9209-924-8
