= Jhusi Kohna =

- Census town
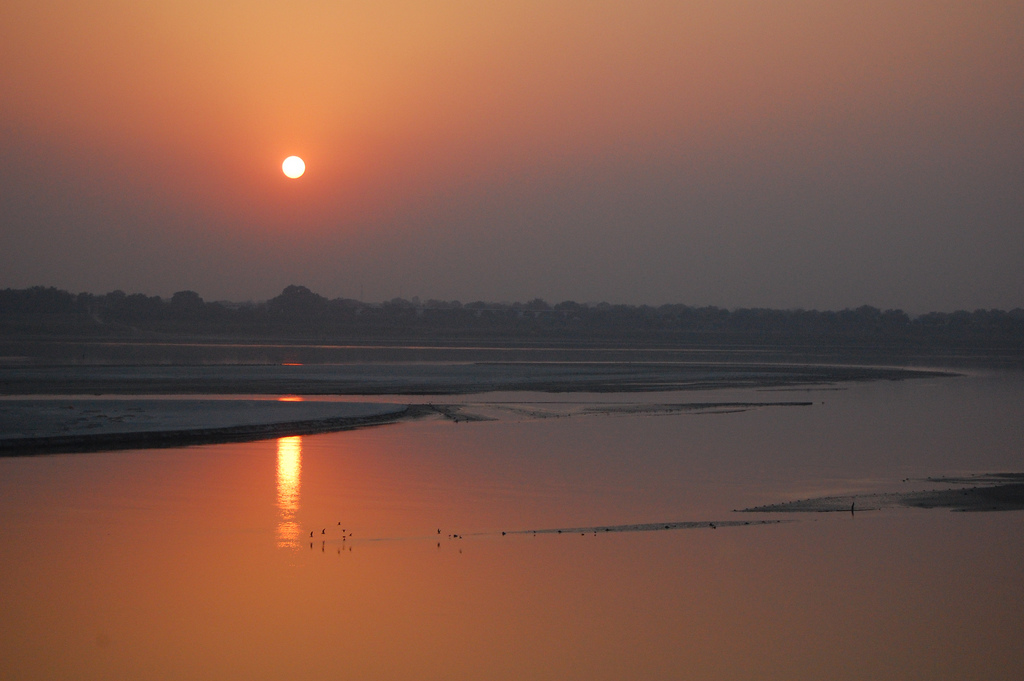

- Location in Uttar Pradesh, India Jhusi Kohna (India)
- Coordinates: 25.43°N 81.89°E
- Country: India
- State: Uttar Pradesh
- District: Prayagraj

Population (2001)
  - Total: 16,309

Language
  - Official: Hindi
  - Additional official: Urdu
- Time zone: UTC+5:30 (IST)
- Vehicle registration: UP
- Website: up.gov.in

Jhusi Kohna is a census town in Prayagraj district in the Indian state of Uttar Pradesh.

== Demographics ==
As of 2001 India census, Jhusi Kohna had a population of 16,309. Males constitute 54% of the population and females 46%. Jhusi Kohna has an average literacy rate of 72%, higher than the national average of 59.5%: male literacy is 79%, and female literacy is 64%. In Jhusi Kohna, 11% of the population is under 6 years of age.
