= Channabasavapurana =

Epic shatpadi poem by Virupakshapandita

Channabasavapurana is an epic shatpadi poem written by Virupakshapandita in Kannada. This book narrates the life story of Channabasavanna as the incarnation of lord Shiva.
