= Jhusi =

Town in India

- Town
- Location in Uttar Pradesh, India
- Coordinates: 25.43°N 81.93°E
- Country: India
- State: Uttar Pradesh
- District: Prayagraj
- Elevation: 76 m (249 ft)

Population (2011)
  - Total: 33,901

Language
  - Official: Hindi
  - Additional official: Urdu
- Time zone: UTC+5:30 (IST)
- Postal Code: 211019
- Vehicle registration: UP-70

Jhusi or Jhunsi is a town in Prayagraj district in the Indian state of Uttar Pradesh. It was formerly called Pratishthanpur or Puri. The place is also noted for being one of the Neolithic sites that provides some of the earliest evidence of farming in South Asia. It is also plays a significant role in Magh Mela, a festival which takes place annually during Magha, the eleventh month of the Hindu calendar.

== Geography ==
Jhusi has an average elevation of 76 metres (249 ft). It is the biggest town area in Prayagraj district. It is located on the banks of the Ganges River, and is connected to the main city by Lal Bahudar Shastri Bridge.

== Demographics ==
As of the 2011 Indian census, Jhusi had a population of 33,901 including the populations of Jhusi Nagar Panchayat and Jhusi Kohna census town, 13,878 and 20,023 respectively.

Now Jhusi is part of Prayagraj Municipal Corporation since last 01 Jan 2020.

== History ==
An archeological site near the confluence of the Ganges and Yamuna rivers yielded a carbon-14 dating of 7106 BCE to 7080 for its Neolithic levels. Historically, Jhusi was known as Pratishthanpur.

The town's name is said to originate from the Hindi word jhulasna, meaning to scorch. According to legend, a king named Harbonga caused an "upheaval on the earth", leading to the city's destruction by fire.

== Education ==
- Govind Ballabh Pant Social Science Institute
- Harish-Chandra Research Institute
- Kamta Singh Girl's P.G. College, Patel Nagar, Jhunsi
- D.R Singh Convent School
- Urmila Devi Inter College
- New R.S.J. Public School
- Central Academy School
