= Prsnigarbha =

Name of the Hindu deity Vishnu

Prsnigarbha (Sanskrit: पृश्निगर्भ, IAST: Pṛśnigarbha) is a name of the Hindu deity Vishnu. According to the Bhagavata Purana, it is the name accorded to one of the avatars of Vishnu. The name is a Sanskrit compound word consisting of the terms pṛśni and garbha, literally meaning, "Pṛśni's embryo".

== Birth ==
The Prajapati Sutapa and his wife Pṛśni worshipped Vishnu with such devotion that he himself appeared before them for granting a boon. In their enthusiasm, they asked thrice, "We need a son equivalent to you". Vishnu told them that he himself would be born as their son in three different janmas (births). He instructed the importance of the practice of brahmacharya to the world.

In the first janma in Satya Yuga, Vishnu was born as Prsnigarba, the son of Sutapa and Pṛśni. In the second life, during the Treta Yuga, he was born as Vamana, the son of Aditi and Kasyapa. In the third life, towards the end of Dvapara Yuga, he was born as Krishna, the son of Vasudeva and Devaki.

According to the Guruvayur Sthala Purana, the deity of Guruvayur was originally given to Pṛśni and Sutapa during the Satya Yuga by Brahma, and it was following the worship of Hari in his four-armed form, that Prsnigarba was born to Pṛśni and Sutapa.
