= Kali Yuga =

Last of four yugas (ages) in Hindu cosmology

Today (at UTC+00)
- Monday, 26 October 2026
- Hindu: Aśvinī・Vajra; Solar: 9 Kārtika, 1948 SE; Lunisolar: Pūrṇimā, Śukla pakṣa of Āśvina, 2083 VE; Rāudra・5127 KY・1,872,874
Other calendars
Akan	Fodwo
Armenian	8 Trē 1476
Aztec	Atlcahualo 4, 4 Ōlīn
Babylonian	13 Tashritu, 2337 SE
Balinese pawukon	Luang, Pepet, Pasah, Jaya, Umanis, Tungleh, Coma of Watugunung, Guru, Nohan, Raksasa
Bengali	10 Kartik, BS 1433
Chinese	Yin Water Rooster・Roof Mansion; Fire Horse Year, Month 9, Day 17 (Shuangjiang, 12 days until Lidong)
Common Era	26 October 2026 CE
Coptic	16 Paopi, AM 1743
Egyptian	13 Phamenoth, 2775 NE
Ethiopian	16 Ṭeqemt, 2019 Amätä Məhrät
French Republican	Décade I, Quartidi de Brumaire de l'Année 235 de la République
Gregorian	26 October, AD 2026
Hebrew	15 Cheshvan, AM 5787
Icelandic	Mánudagur, 3 Gormánuður 2026
Islamic	14 Jumada al-awwal, AH 1448 (using tabular method)
ISO week date	2026-W44-1
Japanese	16 Nagatsuki, Reiwa 8 (Sōkō, 12 days until Rittō)
Julian	13 October, AD 2026 (AM 7535)
Julian day	2461340
Korean	16 Gaedal, 4359 DE
Maya	13.0.14.0.17; 10 Zac, 4 Caban
Roman	ante diem III Idus Octobres, MMDCCLXXIX AUC
Solar Hijri	4 Aban, SH 1405
Tibetan	15 tha skar, me pho rta 2153 or 1772 or 1000

Kali Yuga (Devanagari: कलियुग), in Hinduism, is the fourth, shortest and worst of the four yugas (world ages) in a Yuga cycle, preceded by Dvapara Yuga and followed by the next cycle's Krita (Satya) Yuga. It is believed to be the present age, which is full of conflict and sin.

According to Puranic sources, (Note: The Bhagavata Purana (1.18.6), Vishnu Purana (5.38.8), Brahmanda Purana (2.3.74.241), Vayu Purana (2.37.422), and Brahma Purana (2.103.8) state that the day Krishna left the earth was the day that the Dvapara Yuga ended and the Kali Yuga began.) Krishna's death marked the end of Dvapara Yuga and the start of Kali Yuga, at midnight 17/18 February 3102 BCE (Julian), or 22/23 January (Gregorian). Lasting 432,000 years (1,200 divine years), Kali Yuga began 5,127 years ago and has 426,873 years left as of 2026 CE, ending in 428,899 CE. (Note: Calculations exclude year zero. 1 BCE to 1 CE is one year, not two.)

Near the end of Kali Yuga, when vices are at their worst, a cataclysm will reestablish dharma to usher in the next cycle's Krita (Satya) Yuga, as prophesied by Kalki.

== Etymology ==
Yuga (Sanskrit: युग), in this context, means "an age of the world", where its archaic spelling is yug, with other forms of yugam, yugānāṃ, and yuge, derived from yuj (Sanskrit: युज्, lit. 'to join or yoke'), believed derived from *yeug- (Proto-Indo-European: lit. 'to join or unite').

Kali Yuga (Sanskrit: कलियुग, romanized: kaliyuga or kali-yuga) means "the age of Kali", "the age of darkness", "the age of vice and misery", or "the age of quarrel and hypocrisy".

A complete description of Kali Yuga is found in the Mahabharata, Manusmriti, Vishnu Smriti, and various Puranas.

== Epigraphy ==
According to P. V. Kane, one of the earliest inscriptions with one of the four yugas named is the Pikira grant of Pallava Simhavarman (mid-5th century CE):

Who was ever ready to extricate dharma that had become sunk owing to the evil effects of Kaliyuga.

— Pikira grant of Pallava Simhavarman, line 10 (3rd plate, front)

Other epigraphs exist with named yugas in the Old Mysore region of India, published in Epigraphia Carnatica.

== Start date ==
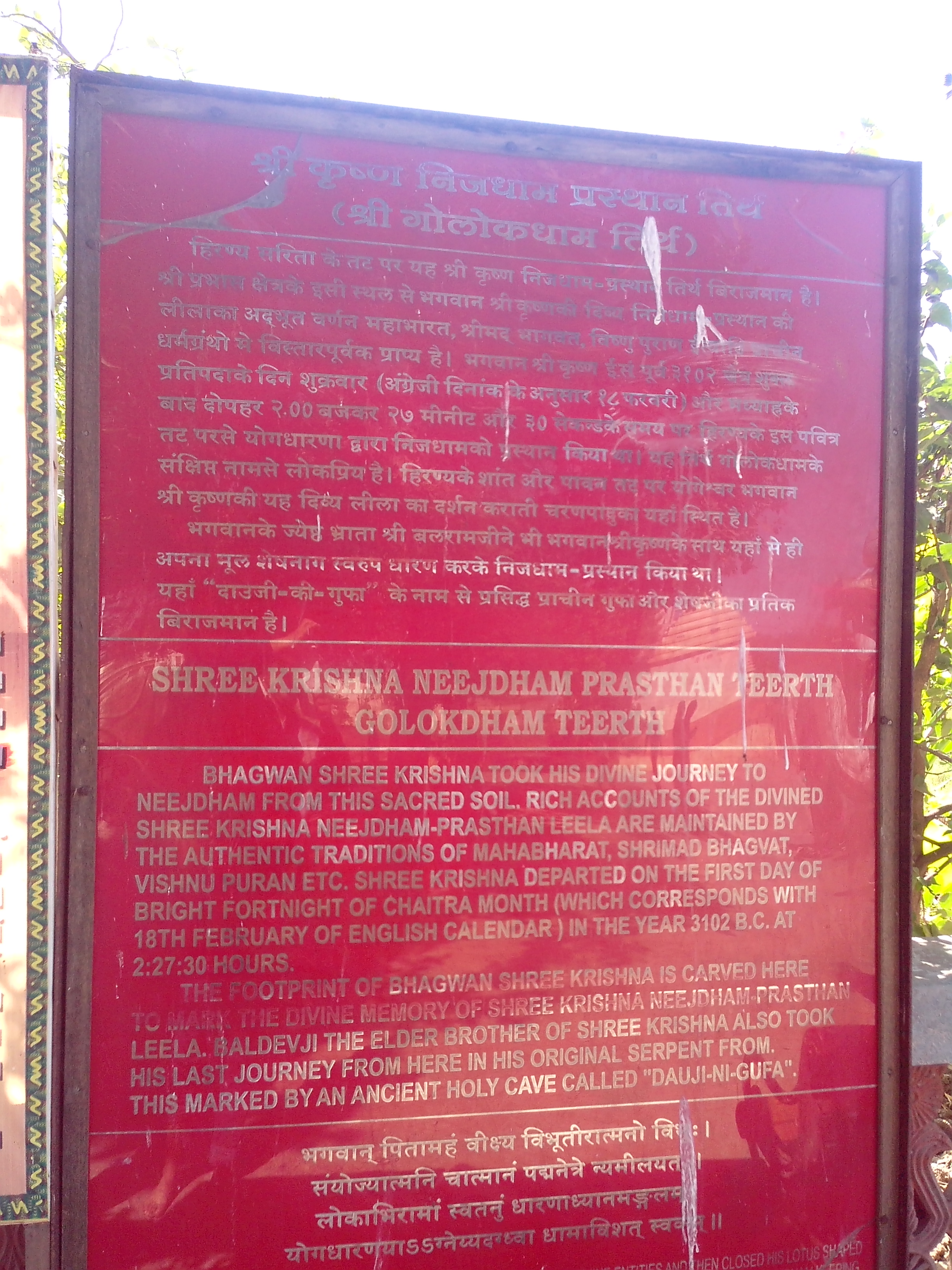
Information kiosk at Bhalka, the place from where Krishna left for his realm in 3102 BCE.

The start date and time of Kali Yuga is traditionally dated to midnight (Ujjain meridian) 17/18 February 3102 BCE (proleptic Julian), corresponding to 22/23 January (proleptic Gregorian).

Astronomer and mathematician Aryabhata, who was born in 476 CE, finished his book Aryabhatiya in 499 CE, in which he wrote "When the three yugas (satyug, tretayug and dwaparyug) have elapsed and 60 x 60 (3,600) years of kaliyug have already passed, I am now 23 years old." Based on this information, Kali Yuga began in 3102 BCE, which is calculated from 3600 - (476 + 23) + 1 (no year zero from 1 BCE to 1 CE).

According to K. D. Abhyankar, the starting point of Kali Yuga is an extremely rare planetary alignment, which is depicted in the Mohenjo-daro seals.

== Duration and structure ==
Hindu texts describe four yugas (world ages) in a Yuga Cycle, where, starting in order from the first age of Krita (Satya) Yuga, each yuga's length decreases according to a ratio of 4:3:2:1. Each yuga is described as having a main period (a.k.a. yuga proper) preceded by its yuga-sandhyā (dawn) and followed by its yuga-sandhyāṃśa (dusk), where each twilight (dawn/dusk) lasts for one-tenth (10%) of its main period. Lengths are given in divine years (years of the gods), each lasting for 360 solar (human) years.

Kali Yuga, the fourth age in a cycle, lasts for 432,000 years (1,200 divine years), where its main period lasts for 360,000 years (1,000 divine years) and its two twilights each last for 36,000 years (100 divine years). The current cycle's Kali Yuga, the present age, has the following dates based on it starting in 3102 BCE:

Structure of kali yuga in current yuga cycle
Part	Start – End	Solar years	Divine years
Kali-yuga-sandhya (dawn)	3102 BCE	36,000	100
Kali-yuga (proper)	32,899 CE	360,000	1,000
Kali-yuga-sandhyamsa (dusk)	392,899–428,899 CE	36,000	100
Total		432,000	1,200

Mahabharata, Book 12 (Shanti Parva), Ch. 231: (Note: Chapter 224 (CCXXIV) in some sources: Mahabharata 12.224.)

(17) A year (of men) is equal to a day and night of the gods ... (19) I shall, in their order, tell you the number of years that are for different purposes calculated differently, in the Krita, the Treta, the Dwapara, and the Kali yugas. (20) Four thousand celestial years is the duration of the first or Krita age. The morning of that cycle consists of four hundred years and its evening is of four hundred years. (21) Regarding the other cycles, the duration of each gradually decreases by a quarter in respect of both the principal period with the minor portion and the conjoining portion itself.

Manusmriti, Ch. 1:

(67) A year is a day and a night of the gods ... (68) But hear now the brief (description of) the duration of a night and a day of Brahman [(Brahma)] and of the several ages (of the world, yuga) according to their order. (69) They declare that the Krita age (consists of) four thousand years (of the gods); the twilight preceding it consists of as many hundreds, and the twilight following it of the same number. (70) In the other three ages with their twilights preceding and following, the thousands and hundreds are diminished by one (in each).

Surya Siddhanta, Ch. 1:

(13) ... twelve months make a year. This is called a day of the gods. (14) ... Six times sixty [360] of them are a year of the gods ... (15) Twelve thousand of these divine years are denominated a Quadruple Age (caturyuga); of ten thousand times four hundred and thirty-two [4,320,000] solar years (16) Is composed that Quadruple Age, with its dawn and twilight. The difference of the Golden and the other Ages, as measured by the difference in the number of the feet of Virtue in each, is as follows : (17) The tenth part of an Age, multiplied successively by four, three, two, and one, gives the length of the Golden and the other Ages, in order : the sixth part of each belongs to its dawn and twilight.

== 10,000-year subperiod ==
A dialogue between Krishna and Ganga found in the Brahma Vaivarta Purana describes that for the first 10,000 years of Kali Yuga, the ill effects of Kali Yuga will be reduced due to the presence of bhakti yogis and the ability to nullify sinful reactions, after which Earth will be devoid of devout religious people and be shackled by Kali Yuga. Gaudiya Vaishnavism believes this subperiod started later in Kali Yuga with the birth of Chaitanya Mahaprabhu (1486 CE).

== Characteristics ==
Hinduism often symbolically represents morality (dharma) as an Indian bull. In the Satya Yuga, the first stage of development, the bull has four legs, which is reduced by one in each age that follows. The four legs of Dharma are Tapas lit. 'austerity', Śauca lit. 'cleanliness', Dayā lit. 'compassion' and Satya lit. 'truth'. By the age of Kali, morality is reduced to only a quarter of that of the golden age, so that the bull of Dharma has only one leg, the one representing Satya.

=== References in the Mahabharata ===
The Kurukshetra War and the decimation of Kauravas thus happened at the Yuga-Sandhi, the point of transition from one yuga to another.

=== Prophesied events ===
A discourse by Markandeya in the Mahabharata identifies some of the attributes of people, animals, nature, and weather during the Kali Yuga.

== Other usage ==
The Kali Yuga is an important concept in both Theosophy and Anthroposophy, and in the writings of Helena Blavatsky, W.Q. Judge, Rudolf Steiner, the esoteric Nazi-sympathiser Savitri Devi and Traditionalist philosophers such as René Guénon and Julius Evola, among others. Rudolf Steiner believed that the Kali Yuga ended in 1900.

== See also ==
- Hindu eschatology
- Hindu units of time
  - Kalpa (day of Brahma)
  - Manvantara (age of Manu)
  - Pralaya (period of dissolution)
  - Yuga cycle (four yuga ages): Satya (Krita), Treta, Dvapara, and Kali
- Historicity of the Mahabharata
- Itihasa (Hindu Tradition)
- Kali ahargana
- List of numbers in Hindu scriptures
- Puranic chronology
