= Murali gana lola =

Murali gana lola is a popular bhajan sung by Hindus celebrating the God Vishnu's two incarnations Rama and Krishna. This bhajan is often connected with Sai Baba. Here are some of the lyrics and their meanings

== Text ==
Murali Gana Lola Nanda Gopa Bala/

Ravo Ravo Radha Lola Radha Lola/

Threta Yugamuna Sitha Ramudai/

Dvapari Yugamuna Radha Loludayi/

Githanu Drapina Taraka Namudayi/

Yuga Yuga Manduna Tagu Rupa Dhariyai/

== Meaning ==
Player of the flute, giver of joy Nanda's son, the cowherd boy (Krishna)/ Come, come, Radha's joy/ In the Treta Yuga You incarnated as Rama, Sita's Lord./ In Dvapara Yuga, You incarnated as Krishna, Radha's Lord./ You are the Savior who taught the Gita./ In every age You assume the appropriate form.

Son of Nanda the shepherd, enchanting flute player, come oh come Lord of Radha. In the Age of Treta, You incarnated as Rama, Lord of Sita. In the Age of Dvapara, You incarnated as Krishna, Lord of Radha. You are the Saviour who taught us the Bhagavad Gita. From age to age You embody the perfect form.

== Acknowledgements ==
- http://www.saibaba.ws/bhajans/muraliganalola.htm
