= Yuga cycle =

Cycle of Satya, Treta, Dvapara and Kali yugas (ages) in Hindu cosmology

A yuga cycle (a.k.a. chatur yuga, maha yuga, etc.) is a cyclic age (epoch) in Hindu cosmology. Each cycle lasts for 4,320,000 years (12,000 divine years (Note: 360 solar years constitute a divine year. This is as per the following belief system: The gods are believed to reside in the north celestial sphere. Due to the axial tilt of the earth, the Sun is overhead the northern hemisphere during the period between the vernal and the autumnal equinox. This period is designated the daytime of the gods. Conversely, the Sun is overhead the southern hemisphere during the period between the autumnal and the vernal equinox. This period is designated the "nighttime of the gods". Put together, an entire tropical solar year is designated the "day of the gods". 360 such "days of the gods" make a divine year.)) and repeats four yugas (world ages): Krita (Satya) Yuga, Treta Yuga, Dvapara Yuga, and Kali Yuga.

As a yuga cycle progresses through the four yugas, each yuga's length and humanity's general moral and physical state within each yuga decrease by one-fourth. Kali Yuga, which lasts for 432,000 years, is believed to have started in 3102 BCE. Near the end of Kali Yuga, when virtues are at their worst, a cataclysm and a reestablishment of dharma occur to usher in the next cycle's Krita (Satya) Yuga, prophesied to occur by Kalki.

There are 71 yuga cycles in a manvantara (age of Manu) and 1,000 yuga cycles in a kalpa (day of Brahma).

== Lexicology ==
A yuga cycle has several names.

Age or Yuga (Sanskrit: युग, lit. 'an age of the gods'):

"Age" and "Yuga", sometimes with reverential capitalization, commonly denote a "catur-yuga", a cycle of four world ages, unless expressly limited by the name of one of its minor ages (e.g. Kali Yuga). (Note: The general word "yuga" is sometimes used instead of the more specific word "catur-yuga". A kalpa is described as lasting 1,000 catur-yuga in Bhagavata Purana 12.4.2 ("catur-yuga") and Bhagavad Gita 8.17 ("yuga").) Its archaic spelling is yug, with other forms of yugam, yugānāṃ, and yuge, derived from yuj (Sanskrit: युज्, lit. 'to join or yoke'), believed derived from *yeug- (Proto-Indo-European: lit. 'to join or unite').

Chatur Yuga (Sanskrit: चतुर्युग, romanized: caturyuga, catur-yuga, chaturyuga, or chatur-yuga, lit. 'catur means four; a set of the four ages'):

A cyclic age encompassing the four yuga ages as defined in Hindu texts: Surya Siddhanta, Manusmriti, and Bhagavata Purana.

Daiva Yuga (Sanskrit: दैवयुग, romanized: daivayuga or daiva-yuga, lit. 'a divine or celestial age; an age of the gods'),
Deva Yuga (Sanskrit: देवयुग, romanized: devayuga or deva-yuga, lit. 'an age of the gods'),
Divya Yuga (Sanskrit: दिव्य युग, romanized: divyayuga or divya-yuga, lit. 'a divine or celestial age'):

A cyclic age of the divine, celestrial, or gods (Devas) encompassing the four yuga ages (a.k.a. "human ages" or "world ages"). The Hindu texts give a length of 12,000 divine years, where a divine year lasts for 360 solar (human) years.

Maha Yuga (Sanskrit: महायुग, romanized: mahāyuga or mahā-yuga, lit. 'a great age'):

A greater cyclic age encompassing the smaller four yuga ages.

Yuga cycle (Sanskrit: युग, lit. 'age') + (English: cycle):

A cyclic age encompassing the four yuga ages.

It is theorized that the concept of the four yugas originated some time after the compilation of the four Vedas, but prior to the rest of the Hindu texts, based on the concept's absence in the former writings. It is believed that the four yugas—Krita (Satya), Treta, Dvapara, and Kali—are named after throws of an Indian game of long dice, marked with 4-3-2-1 respectively. A dice game is described in the Rigveda, Atharvaveda, Upanishads, Ramayana, Mahabharata, and Puranas, while the four yugas are described after the four Vedas with no mention of a correlation to dice. A complete description of the four yugas and their characteristics are in the Vishnu Smriti (ch. 20), Mahabharata (e.g. Vanaparva 149, 183), Manusmriti (I.81–86), and Puranas (e.g. Brahma, ch. 122–123; Matsya, ch. 142–143; Naradiya, Purvardha, ch. 41). The four yugas are also described in the Bhagavata Purana (3.11.18–20).

== Duration and structure ==
Hindu texts describe four yugas (world ages) in a yuga cycle—Krita (Satya) Yuga, Treta Yuga, Dvapara Yuga, and Kali Yuga—where, starting in order from the first age, each yuga's length decreases according to a ratio of 4:3:2:1. Each yuga is described as having a main period (a.k.a. yuga proper) preceded by its yuga-sandhyā (dawn) and followed by its yuga-sandhyāṃśa (dusk), where each twilight (dawn/dusk) lasts for one-tenth (10%) of its main period. Lengths are given in divine years (years of the gods), each lasting for 360 solar (human) years.

Each yuga cycle lasts for 4,320,000 years (12,000 divine years) with its four yugas: Krita (Satya) Yuga for 1,728,000 (4,800 divine) years, Treta Yuga for 1,296,000 (3,600 divine) years, Dvapara Yuga for 864,000 (2,400 divine) years, and Kali Yuga for 432,000 (1,200 divine) years.

Structure of yuga cycle
Part	Solar years	Divine years
Krita-yuga-sandhya (dawn)	144,000	400
Krita-yuga (proper)	1,440,000	4,000
Krita-yuga-sandhyamsa (dusk)	144,000	400
Treta-yuga-sandhya (dawn)	108,000	300
Treta-yuga (proper)	1,080,000	3,000
Treta-yuga-sandhyamsa (dusk)	108,000	300
Dvapara-yuga-sandhya (dawn)	72,000	200
Dvapara-yuga (proper)	720,000	2,000
Dvapara-yuga-sandhyamsa (dusk)	72,000	200
Kali-yuga-sandhya (dawn)	36,000	100
Kali-yuga (proper)	360,000	1,000
Kali-yuga-sandhyamsa (dusk)	36,000	100
Total	4,320,000	12,000

The current cycle's four yugas have the following dates based on Kali Yuga, the fourth and present age, starting in 3102 BCE:

Current yuga cycle (Note: Each Kali-yuga-sandhi lasts for 36,000 solar (100 divine) years: * Sandhya: 3102 BCE – 32,899 CE * Sandhyamsa: 392,899–428,899 CE)
Yuga	Start – End	Solar years	Divine years
Krita (Satya)	3,891,102 BCE	1,728,000	4,800
Treta	2,163,102 BCE	1,296,000	3,600
Dvapara	867,102 BCE	864,000	2,400
Kali	3102 BCE – 428,899 CE	432,000	1,200
Total		4,320,000	12,000

Mahabharata, Book 12 (Shanti Parva), Ch. 231: (Note: Chapter 224 (CCXXIV) in some sources: Mahabharata 12.224.)

(17) A year (of men) is equal to a day and night of the gods ... (19) I shall, in their order, tell you the number of years that are for different purposes calculated differently, in the Krita, the Treta, the Dwapara, and the Kali yugas. (20) Four thousand celestial years is the duration of the first or Krita age. The morning of that cycle consists of four hundred years and its evening is of four hundred years. (21) Regarding the other cycles, the duration of each gradually decreases by a quarter in respect of both the principal period with the minor portion and the conjoining portion itself. (29) The learned say that these twelve thousand celestial years form what is called a cycle ...

Manusmriti, Ch. 1:

(67) A year is a day and a night of the gods ... (68) But hear now the brief (description of) the duration of a night and a day of Brahman [(Brahma)] and of the several ages (of the world, yuga) according to their order. (69) They declare that the Krita age (consists of) four thousand years (of the gods); the twilight preceding it consists of as many hundreds, and the twilight following it of the same number. (70) In the other three ages with their twilights preceding and following, the thousands and hundreds are diminished by one (in each). (71) These twelve thousand (years) which thus have been just mentioned as the total of four (human) ages, are called one age of the gods.

Surya Siddhanta, Ch. 1:

(13) ... twelve months make a year. This is called a day of the gods. (14) ... Six times sixty [360] of them are a year of the gods ... (15) Twelve thousand of these divine years are denominated a Quadruple Age (caturyuga); of ten thousand times four hundred and thirty-two [4,320,000] solar years (16) Is composed that Quadruple Age, with its dawn and twilight. The difference of the Golden and the other Ages, as measured by the difference in the number of the feet of Virtue in each, is as follows : (17) The tenth part of an Age, multiplied successively by four, three, two, and one, gives the length of the Golden and the other Ages, in order : the sixth part of each belongs to its dawn and twilight.

== Greater cycles ==
There are 71 yuga cycles (306,720,000 years) in a manvantara, a period ruled by Manu, who is the progenitor of mankind. There are 1,000 yuga cycles (4,320,000,000 years) in a kalpa, a period that is a day (12-hour day proper) of Brahma, who is the creator of the planets and first living entities. There are 14 manvantaras (4,294,080,000 years) in a kalpa with a remainder of 25,920,000 years assigned to 15 manvantara-sandhyas (junctures), each the length of a Satya Yuga (1,728,000 years). A kalpa is followed by a pralaya (night or partial dissolution) of equal length forming a full day (24-hour day). A maha-kalpa (life of Brahma) lasts for 100 360-day years of Brahma, which lasts for 72,000,000 yuga cycles (311.04 trillion years) and is followed by a maha-pralaya (full dissolution) of equal length.

We are currently halfway through Brahma's life (maha-kalpa):

- 51st year of 100 (2nd half or parardha)
- 1st month of 12
- 1st kalpa (Shveta-Varaha Kalpa) of 30
- 7th manvantara (Vaivasvatha Manu) of 14
- 28th chatur-yuga (a.k.a. yuga cycle) of 71
- 4th yuga (Kali Yuga) of 4

Yuga dates are used in an ashloka, which is read out at the beginning of Hindu rites to specify the elapsed time in Brahma's life. For example, an ashloka in 2007 CE of the Gregorian calendar might include the lines: (Note: A common error exists in calculating from 1 BCE to 1 CE as 2 years instead of 1. There is no year zero.)

5109 of Kalyugi year of the 28th Chaturyugee of the 7th Manvantara on the first day of the 51st year of the 2nd Brahma [(2nd half of Brahma's life)].

== Virtues ==
According to the Manusmriti, the virtue (dharma) of human beings varies across the four yugas (ages). The text states:

तपः परं कृतयुगे त्रेतायां ज्ञानमुच्यते ।
द्वापरे यज्ञमेवाहुर्दानमेकं कलौ युगे ॥

tapaḥ paraṃ kṛtayuge tretāyāṃ jñānamucyate

dvāpare yajñamevāhurdānamekaṃ kalau yuge

In the Krita Yuga, the virtue is austerity (tapas); in the Treta Yuga, it is knowledge (jnana); in the Dvapara Yuga, it is sacrifice (yajna); and in the Kali Yuga, it is charity (dāna).

== Avatars ==
=== Ganesha ===
Ganesha avatars are described as coming during specific yugas.

=== Vishnu ===
The Puranas describe Vishnu avatars that come during specific yugas, but may not occur in every yuga cycle.

Vamana appears at the beginning of Treta Yuga. According to Vayu Purana, Vamana's 3rd appearance was in the 7th Treta Yuga.

Rama appears during the Treta Yuga. According to Vayu Purana and Matsya Purana, Rama appeared in the 24th yuga cycle. According to Padma Purana, Rama also appeared in the 27th yuga cycle of the 6th (previous) manvantara.

=== Vyasa ===
Vyasa is attributed as the compiler of the four Vedas, Mahabharata, and Puranas. According to the Vishnu Purana, Kurma Purana, and Shiva Purana, a different Vyasa comes at the end of each Dvapara Yuga to write down veda (knowledge) to guide humans in the degraded age of Kali Yuga.

== Modern theories ==
Breaking from the long duration of a yuga cycle, new theories have emerged regarding the length, number, and order of the yugas.

=== Sri Yukteswar Giri ===
Swami Sri Yukteswar Giri (1855–1936) proposed a yuga cycle of 24,000 years in the introduction of his book The Holy Science (1894).

He claimed the understanding that Kali Yuga lasts for 432,000 years was a mistake, which he traced back to Raja Parikshit, just after the descending Dvapara Yuga ended (c. 3101 BCE) and all the wise men of his court retired to the Himalaya Mountains. With no one left to correctly calculate the ages, Kali Yuga never officially started. After 499 CE, in ascending Dvapara Yuga, when the intellect of men began to develop, but not fully, they noticed mistakes and attempted to correct them by converting what they thought to be divine years to human years (1:360 ratio). Yukteswar's yuga lengths for Satya, Treta, Dvapara, and Kali are respectively 4,800, 3,600, 2,400, and 1,200 "human" years (12,000 years total).

He accepted the four yugas and their 4:3:2:1 length and dharma proportions, but his yuga cycle contained eight yugas, the original descending set of the four yugas followed by an ascending (reversed) set, where he called each set a "Daiva Yuga" or "Electric Couple". His yuga cycle lasts for 24,000 years, which he believed equals one precession of the equinoxes (traditionally 25,920 years; 1,920 years difference). He states that the world entered the Pisces-Virgo Age in 499 CE ("cycle bottom"), and that the current age of ascending Dvapara Yuga started in 1699 CE around the time of scientific discoveries and advancements such as electricity.

He explained that in a 24,000-year yuga cycle, the Sun completes one orbit around some dual star, becoming nearer and farther to a galactic center, which the pair orbit in a longer period. He called this galactic center Vishnunabhi (Vishnu's Navel), where Brahma regulates dharma or, as Yukteswar defined it, mental virtue. Dharma is lowest when farthest from Brahma at the descending-ascending intersection ("cycle-bottom"), where the opposite occurs at the "cycle-top" when nearest. At dharma's lowest (499 CE), human intellect cannot comprehend anything beyond the gross material world.

Sri Yukteswar's yuga cycle
Arc	Yuga	Start – End	Years
Descending (12,000 years)	Krita (Satya)	11,501 BCE	4,800
Descending (12,000 years)	Treta	6701 BCE	3,600
Descending (12,000 years)	Dvapara	3101 BCE	2,400
Descending (12,000 years)	Kali	701 BCE	1,200
Ascending (12,000 years)	Kali	499 CE	1,200
Ascending (12,000 years)	Dvapara	1699 CE	2,400
Ascending (12,000 years)	Treta	4099 CE	3,600
Ascending (12,000 years)	Krita (Satya)	7699–12,499 CE	4,800
Total			24,000

Joscelyn Godwin states that Yukteswar believed the traditional chronology of the yugas wrong and rigged for political reasons, but that Yukteswar may have had political reasons of his own, evident in a police report printed in Atlantis and the Cycles of Time, which links Yukteswar to a secret anti-colonial movement called Yugantar, meaning "new age" or "transition of an epoch".

Godwin claims the Jain time cycle and the European myth of progress influenced Yukteswar, whose theory only recently became prominent outside India. Humanity in an upward cycle is contrary to traditional ideas. Godwin points out many philosophies and religions that started during a time when "man could not see beyond the gross material world" (701 BCE – 1699 CE). Only materialists and atheists would welcome the post-1700 age as an improvement.

John Major Jenkins, who adjusted ascending Kali Yuga from 499 CE to 2012 in his version, criticizes Yukteswar as wanting the "cycle-bottom" to correspond to his education, beliefs, and historical understanding. Technology has thrust us deeper into material dependency and spiritual darkness.

=== René Guénon ===
René Guénon (1886–1951) proposed a yuga cycle of 64,800 years in his 1931 French article, which was later translated in the book Traditional Forms & Cosmic Cycles (2001).

Guénon accepted the doctrine of the four yugas, the 4:3:2:1 yuga length proportions, and Kali Yuga as the present age. He couldn't accept the extremely large lengths and felt they were encoded with additional zeros to mislead those who might use it to predict the future. He reduced a yuga cycle from 4,320,000 to 4,320 years (1,728 + 1,296 + 864 + 432), but he felt this was too short for humanity's history.

In looking for a multiplier, he worked backwards from the precession of the equinoxes (traditionally 25,920 years; 360 72-year degrees). Using 25,920 and 72, he calculated the sub-multiplier to be 4,320 years (72 × 60 = 4,320; 4,320 × 6 = 25,920). In noticing the "great year" of the Persians (~12,000) and Greeks (~13,000) as almost half the precession, he concluded a "great year" must be 12,960 years (4,320 × 3). In trying to find the whole number of "great years" in a manvantara or reign of Vaivasvata Manu, he found the reign of Xisuthros of the Chaldeans to be set to 64,800 years (12,960 × 5), someone he thought to be the same Manu. Guénon felt 64,800 years was a more plausible length that may line up with humanity's history. He calculated a 64,800 manvantara divided into a 4,320 "encoded" yuga cycle gave a multiplier of 15 (5 "great years"). Using 15 as the multiplier, he "decoded" a 5-"great year" yuga cycle as having the following yuga lengths:

- Satya: 25,920 (4 ratio or 2 × "great year"; 15 × 1,728)
- Treta: 19,440 (3 ratio or 1.5 × "great year"; 15 × 1,296)
- Dvapara: 12,960 (2 ratio or 1 × "great year"; 15 × 864)
- Kali: 6,480 (1 ratio or 0.5 × "great year"; 15 × 432)

Guénon did not give a start date for Kali Yuga, but instead left clues in his description of the cataclysmic destruction of the Atlantean civilization. His commentator, Jean Robin, in an early 1980s publication, claimed to have decoded this description and calculated that Kali Yuga lasted from 4481 BCE to 1999 CE (2000 CE excluding year 0). In Les Quatre Âges de L’Humanité (The Four Ages of Humanity), a book written in 1949 by Gaston Georgel, this same end date of 1999 CE was calculated; although, in his 1983 book titled Le Cycle Judéo-Chrétien (The Judeo-Christian Cycle), he later argued to shift the cycle forward by 31 years to end in 2030 CE.

René Guénon's yuga cycle (Note: René Guénon's yuga cycle table: the calculated dates are based on the 1949 publication by Gaston Georgel, Les Quatre Âges de L’Humanité (The Four Ages of Humanity), and an early 1980s publication by Jean Robin.)
Yuga	Start – End	Years
Krita (Satya)	62,801 BCE	25,920
Treta	36,881 BCE	19,440
Dvapara	17,441 BCE	12,960
Kali	4481 BCE – 1999 CE	6,480
Total		64,800

=== Alain Daniélou ===
Alain Daniélou (1907–1994) proposed a yuga cycle of 60,487 years in his book While the Gods Play: Shaiva Oracles and Predictions on the Cycles of History and the Destiny of Mankind (1985).

Daniélou and René Guénon had some correspondence where they both couldn't accept the extremely large lengths found in the Puranas. Daniélou mostly cited Linga Purana and his calculations are based on a 4,320,000-year yuga cycle containing (his calculation of 1000 ÷ 14) 71.42 manvantaras, each containing four yugas [4:3:2:1 proportions]. He pegged 3102 BCE as the start of Kali Yuga and placed it after the dawn (yuga-sandhya). He claimed his dates are accurate to within 50 years, and that the yuga cycle started with a great flood and appearance of Cro-Magnon man, and will end with a catastrophe wiping out mankind.

Alain Daniélou's yuga cycle
Yuga	Start – End	Years
Krita (Satya)	58,042 BCE	24,195
Treta	33,848 BCE	18,146
Dvapara	15,703 BCE	12,097
Kali	3606 BCE – 2442 CE	6,048.72
Total		60,487

Joscelyn Godwin found that Daniélou's misunderstanding rests solely on a bad translation of Linga Purana 1.4.7.

== Hindu astronomy ==
In the early texts of Hindu astronomy such as Surya Siddhanta, the length of a yuga cycle is used to specify the orbital period of heavenly bodies. Instead of specifying the period of a single orbit of a heavenly body around the Earth, the number of orbits of a heavenly body in a yuga cycle is specified.

Surya Siddhanta, Ch. 1:

(29) In an Age (yuga), the revolutions of the sun, Mercury, and Venus, and of the conjunctions (shighra) of Mars, Saturn, and Jupiter, moving eastward, are four million, three hundred and twenty thousand; (30) Of the moon, fifty-seven million, seven hundred and fifty-three thousand, three hundred and thirty-six; of Mars, two million, two hundred and ninety-six thousand, eight hundred and thirty-two; (31) Of Mercury's conjunction (shighra), seventeen million, nine hundred and thirty-seven thousand, and sixty; of Jupiter, three hundred and sixty-four thousand, two hundred and twenty; (32) Of Venus's conjunction (shigra), seven million, twenty-two thousand, three hundred and seventy-six; of Saturn, one hundred and forty-six thousand, five hundred and sixty-eight; (33) Of the moon's apsis (ucca), in an Age, four hundred and eighty-eight thousand, two hundred and three; of its node (pata), in the contrary direction, two hundred and thirty-two thousand, two hundred and thirty-eight; (34) Of the asterisms, one billion, five hundred and eighty-two million, two hundred and thirty-seven thousand, eight hundred and twenty-eight....

The orbital period of heavenly bodies can be derived from the above numbers provided the starting point of a yuga cycle is known. According to Burgess, the Surya Siddhanta fixes the starting point of Kali Yuga as:

The instant at which the Age is made to commence is midnight on the meridian of Ujjayini, at the end of the 588,465th and beginning of the 588,466th day (civil reckoning) of the Julian Period, or between the 17th and 18th of February 1612 J.P., or 3102 B.C.

Based on this starting point, Ebenezer Burgess calculates the following planetary orbital periods:

Sidereal revolutions of planets (geocentric)
Planet	Surya Siddhanta		Modern length (day hr min sec)
Planet	In yuga cycle	Length (Note: Calculated in mean solar time.) (day hr min sec)	Modern length (day hr min sec)
Sun	4,320,000	365 6 12 36.6	365 6 9 10.8
Mercury	17,937,060	87 23 16 22.3	87 23 15 43.9
Venus	7,022,376	224 16 45 56.2	224 16 49 8.0
Mars	2,296,832	686 23 56 23.5	686 23 30 41.4
Jupiter	364,220	4,332 7 41 44.4	4,332 14 2 8.6
Saturn	146,568	10,765 18 33 13.6	10,759 5 16 32.2
Moon (sidereal)	57,753,336	27 7 43 12.6	27 7 43 11.4
Moon (synodic)	53,433,336	29 12 44 2.8	29 12 44 2.9

== Other cultures ==
According to Robert Bolton, there is a universal belief in many traditions that the world started in a perfect state, when nature and the supernatural were still in harmony with all things in their fullest degree of perfection possible, which was followed by an unpreventable constant deterioration of the world through the ages.

In the Works and Days (lines 109–201; c. 700 BCE), considered the earliest European writing about human ages, the Greek poet Hesiod describes five ages (Golden, Silver, Bronze, Heroic, and Iron Ages), where the Heroic Age was added, according to Godwin, as a compromise with Greek history when the Trojan War and its heroes loomed so large. Bolton explains that the men of the Golden Age lived like gods without sorrow, toil, grief, and old age, while the men of the Iron Age ("the race of iron") never rest from labor and sorrow, are degenerated without shame, morality, and righteous indignation, and have short lives with frequent deaths at night, where even a new-born baby shows signs of old age, only to end when Zeus destroys it all.

In the Statesman (c. 399 – c. 347 BCE), the Athenian philosopher Plato describes time as an indefinite cycle of two 36,000-year halves: (1) the world's unmaking descent into chaos and destruction; (2) the world's remaking by its creator into a renewed state. In the Cratylus (397e), Plato recounts the golden race of men who came first, who were noble and good daemons (godlike guides) upon the earth.

In the Metamorphoses (I, 89–150; c. 8 BCE), the Roman poet Ovid describes four ages (Golden, Silver, Bronze, and Iron Ages), excluding Hesiod's Heroic Age, as a downward curve with the present time as the nadir of misery and immorality, according to Godwin, affecting both human life and the after-death state, where deaths in the first two ages became immortal, watchful spirits that benefited the human race, deaths in the third age went to Hades (Greek god of the underworld), and deaths in the fourth age had an unknown fate.

Joscelyn Godwin posits that it is probably from Hindu tradition that knowledge of the ages reached the Greeks and other Indo-European peoples. Godwin adds that the number 432,000 (Kali Yuga's duration) occurring in four widely separated cultures (Hindu, Chaldean, Chinese, and Icelandic) has long been noticed.

However, the Mesopotamian figures are not uniform: the Sumerian King List gives 241,200 years for eight antediluvian kings, tablet WB 62 gives 456,000 for ten, and Berossus gives 432,000. Cassuto, notes that these totals are sexagesimal constructions — 241,200 equals 216,000 plus seven šāru of 3,600, and Berossus's 432,000 equals 120 šāru, or twice 216,000.

In Symbolic Astronomy, Mackenzie Muileboom points out that the numbers 432, 84, 24, and 10 often appear together in these mythologies: e.g. according to Berossus, the 10 pre-flood Kings ruled for 432000 years; in Jainism, the 22nd tirthankara (out of 24) is said to have lived 84000 years ago; the Iliad and Odyssey recount a 10 year war and a 10 year voyage and are divided into 24 books each; Mount Meru is said to be 84000 yojanas high, has 9 or 10 levels (as depicted at Borobudur, whose six square levels have 432 Buddha statues), and represents the Earth's axis (whose tilt varies between 22 and 24 degrees, causing the "four seasons", the equinoxes and solstices, like the 4 yugas), which form a mathematical sequence, since 431 is the 83rd prime number, 83 is the 23rd prime number, and 23 is the 9th prime number.

== See also ==
- Hindu eschatology
- Hindu units of time
  - Kalpa (day of Brahma)
  - Manvantara (age of Manu)
  - Pralaya (period of dissolution)
  - Yuga cycle (four yuga ages): Satya (Krita), Treta, Dvapara, and Kali
- Itihasa (Hindu Tradition)
- List of numbers in Hindu scriptures
- Vedic-Puranic chronology
