= Kalpa (time) =

Long period of time in Hindu and Buddhist cosmology

A kalpa is a long period of time (aeon) in Hindu and Buddhist cosmology, generally between the creation and recreation of a world or universe.

== Etymology ==
Kalpa (Sanskrit: कल्प, lit. 'a formation or creation') in this context, means "a long period of time (aeon) related to the lifetime of the universe (creation)". It is derived from कॢप् (kḷp) + -अ (-a, nominalizing suffix) (Sanskrit: कॢप्, romanized: kḷp, lit. 'to create, prepare, form, produce, compose, invent').

== Hinduism ==
In Hinduism, a kalpa is a unit of time equal to 4.32 billion years. It corresponds to one day in the life of Brahma, the creator god, and represents the active, creative phase of the cosmic cycle. Each kalpa is made up of 1,000 Yuga Cycles, vast ages that repeat in a set pattern.

A kalpa is further divided into 14 manvantaras. Each manvantara lasts for 71 Yuga Cycles, or 306.72 million years. Before the first manvantara and after each one are transitional periods known as sandhyas, each as long as a Satya Yuga—1.728 million years.

At the end of each kalpa, the universe enters a period of rest and dissolution called pralaya, or the night of Brahma. This night is equal in length to the day—another 4.32 billion years. Together, one day and night of Brahma make up a full cosmic day, totaling 8.64 billion years.

Expanding further, a month of Brahma contains 30 such day-and-night cycles, which adds up to 259.2 billion years. A year of Brahma consists of 12 months, or 360 days and nights, equaling 3.1104 trillion years. Brahma's full lifespan is 100 of these divine years—a span of 311.04 trillion years, known as a maha-kalpa.

According to the traditional time-keeping, 50 years of Brahma's life have already passed. We are currently living in the Shveta-Varaha Kalpa, which marks the first day of Brahma’s 51st year. At the conclusion of each kalpa, it is believed that the world is destroyed by fire, only to be recreated again when the next day of Brahma begins.

The definition of a kalpa equaling 4.32 billion years is found in the Puranas such as Vishnu Purana and Bhagavata Purana.

The duration of the material universe is limited. It is manifested in cycles of kalpas. A kalpa is a day of Brahmā, and one day of Brahmā consists of a thousand cycles of four yugas, or ages: Satya Yuga, Treta Yuga, Dvapara Yuga and Kali Yuga. ... These four yugas, rotating a thousand times, comprise one day of Brahmā, and the same number comprise one night. Brahmā lives one hundred of such "years" and then dies. These "hundred years" total 311 trillion 40 billion (311,040,000,000,000) earth years. By these calculations the life of Brahmā seems fantastic and interminable, but from the viewpoint of eternity it is as brief as a lightning flash. In the Causal Ocean there are innumerable Brahmās rising and disappearing like bubbles. Brahmā and his creation are all part of the material universe, and therefore they are in constant flux.

— Brihat Swasthani Brata Katha

The Matsya Purana (290.3–12) lists the names of 30 kalpas, each named by Brahma based on a significant event in the kalpa and the most glorious person in the beginning of the kalpa. These 30 kalpas or days (along with 30 pralayas or nights) form a 30-day month of Brahma.

1. Śveta (current)
2. Nīlalohita
3. Vāmadeva
4. Rathantara
5. Raurava
6. Deva
7. Vṛhat
8. Kandarpa
9. Sadya
10. Iśāna
11. Tamah
12. Sārasvata
13. Udāna
14. Gāruda
15. Kaurma
16. Nārasiṁha
17. Samāna
18. Āgneya
19. Soma
20. Mānava
21. Tatpumān
22. Vaikuṇṭha
23. Lakṣmī
24. Sāvitrī
25. Aghora
26. Varāha
27. Vairaja
28. Gaurī
29. Māheśvara
30. Pitṛ

The Vayu Purana has a different list of names for 33 kalpas, which G. V. Tagare describes as fanciful derivations.

== Buddhism ==
In the Pali language of early Buddhism, the word kalpa takes the form kappa, and is mentioned in the assumed oldest scripture of Buddhism, the Sutta Nipata. This speaks of "Kappâtita: one who has gone beyond time, an Arahant". This part of the Buddhist manuscripts dates back to the middle part of the last millennium BCE.

Gautama Buddha claimed an incalculable number of Buddhas lived in previous kalpas: Vipassi Buddha 91 kalpas ago, Sikhi Buddha 31 kalpas ago, and three prior Buddhas in the present kalpa. He confines his teachings to the present kalpa, the duration of which he does not arithmetically define, but uses a similitude:

Were a man to take a piece of cloth of this most delicate texture [of fine cotton], and therewith to touch in the slightest possible manner, once in a hundred years, a solid rock, free from earth, a yojana [12 kilometres] high, and as much broad, the time would come when it would be worn down, by this imperceptible trituration, to the size of a mung seed. This period would be immense in its duration; but it has been declared by Buddha that it would not be equal to a Maha Kalpa.

A similar similitude is found in the Mountain Pabbata Sutta (SN 15:5) of the Pali Canon:

Suppose there were a great mountain of rock—a league long, a league wide, a league high, uncracked, uncavitied, a single mass—and a man would come along once every hundred years and rub it once with a Kashi cloth. More quickly would that great mountain of rock waste away and be consumed by that effort, but not the eon [kalpa]. That's how long, monk, an eon is.

— Ṭhānissaro Bhikkhu (translator)

Described in the Vibhanga division of the Abhidhamma Pitaka are sixteen rupa brahma lokas (worlds or planes) and four higher arupa brahma lokas, each attained through the imperfect, medial or perfect performance of the four states of jhāna (meditation), granting a duration of life measured in kalpas that exceed the top-most heavenly loka of 9.216 billion years:

- 1st jhāna leads to 3 lowest rupa lokas with respective lifespans of 1/3, 1/2 and 1 kalpa.
- 2nd jhāna leads to 3 higher rupa lokas with respective lifespans of 2, 4 and 8 kalpas.
- 3rd jhāna leads to 3 more higher rupa lokas with respective lifespans of 16, 32 and 64 kalpas.
- 4th jhāna leads to 7 highest rupa lokas with respective lifespans ranging from 500 to 16,000 kalpas, and 4 still higher arupa lokas with respective lifespans of 20,000; 40,000; 60,000 and 84,000 kalpas.

At the termination of each kalpa, the lower three rupa brahma lokas, attained through the 1st jhāna, and everything below them (six heavens, Earth, etc.), are destroyed by fire (seven suns), only to later again come into being.

In one explanation, there are four different lengths of kalpas. A regular kalpa is approximately 16 million years long (16,798,000 years), and a small kalpa is 1000 regular kalpas, or about 16.8 billion years. Further, a medium kalpa is roughly 336 billion years, the equivalent of 20 small kalpas. A great kalpa is four medium kalpas, or about 1.3 trillion years.

Gautama Buddha did not give the exact length of the maha-kalpa in terms of years. However, he gave several analogies to understand it.

Imagine a huge empty cube at the beginning of a kalpa, approximately 16 miles in each side. Once every 100 years, you insert a tiny mustard seed into the cube. According to the Buddha, the huge cube will be filled even before the kalpa ends.

In one instance, when some monks wanted to know how many kalpas had elapsed so far, Buddha gave this analogy:

If you count the total number of sand particles at the depths of the Ganga river, from where it begins to where it ends at the Bay of Bengal sea, even that number will be less than the number of passed kalpas.

Another definition of Kalpa is the world where Buddhas are born. There are generally 2 types of kalpa, Suñña-Kalpa and Asuñña-kalpa. The Suñña-Kalpa is the world where no Buddha is born. Asuñña-Kalpa is the world where at least one Buddha is born. There are 5 types of Asuñña-Kalpa:

1. Sāra-Kalpa – The world where one Buddha is born.
2. Maṇḍa-Kalpa – The world where two Buddhas are born.
3. Vara-Kalpa – The world where three Buddhas are born.
4. Sāramaṇḍa-Kalpa – The world where four Buddhas are born.
5. Bhadda-Kalpa – The world where five Buddhas are born.

The previous kalpa was the Vyuhakalpa (Glorious aeon), the present kalpa is called the Bhadrakalpa (Auspicious aeon), and the next kalpa will be the Nakshatrakalpa (Constellation aeon).

== See also ==
- Brahma
- Hindu units of time
  - Kalpa (day of Brahma)
  - Manvantara (age of Manu)
  - Pralaya (period of dissolution)
  - Yuga cycle (four yuga ages): Satya (Krita), Treta, Dvapara, and Kali
- List of numbers in Hindu scriptures
