= Cyclical history =

Cyclic history or Cyclical history may refer to:

- Social cycle theory
- Cycle of yugas, ages or stages
