= Vedic timeline =

"Vedic timeline" may refer to

- the Vedic period of Indian prehistory (mid-2nd to mid-1st millennium BC)
- the relative chronology of Vedic Sanskrit in historical linguistics
- the mythological chronology associated with the Sanskrit epics
- traditional Hindu units of time
