= Hindu units of time =

Hindu units of time are described in Hindu texts ranging from microseconds to trillions of years, including cycles of cosmic time that repeat general events in Hindu cosmology. Time (kāla) is described as eternal. Various fragments of time are described in the Vedas, Manusmriti, Bhagavata Purana, Vishnu Purana, Mahabharata, Surya Siddhanta etc.

== Sidereal metrics ==
Hindu measurements in logarithmic scale based on seconds

Sidereal astrology maintains the alignment between signs and constellations via corrective systems of Hindu (Vedic)-origin known as ayanamsas (Sanskrit: 'ayana' "movement" + 'aṃśa' "component"), to allow for the observed precession of equinoxes, whereas tropical astrology ignores precession. This has caused the two systems, which were aligned around 2,000 years ago, to drift apart over the centuries.

Ayanamsa systems used in Hindu astrology (also known as Vedic astrology) include the Lahiriayanamsa and the Raman ayanamsa. The Fagan-Bradley ayanamsa is an example of an ayanamsa system used in Western sidereal astrology. As of 2020, zodiacal signs calculated using the Sri Yukteswar ayanamsa were around 23 degrees behind tropical zodiacal signs. Per these calculations, persons born between March 12 - April 12, for instance, would have the sun sign of Pisces. By contrast, persons born between March 21 - April 19 would have the sun sign of Aries per tropical calculations.

Sidereal units of time
Unit	Definition	Value in SI units
truti (त्रुटि)	base unit	≈ 29.6 μs
reṇu (रेणु)	60 truti	≈ 18.5 μs
lava (लव)	60 renu	≈ 1,111 μs
līkṣaka (लीक्षक)	60 lava	≈ 66.66 ms
liptā (लिप्ता)	6 līkṣaka	≈ 0.4 s
vipala (विपल)	6 līkṣaka	≈ 0.4 s
prāṇa (प्राण)	10 liptā	≈ 4 s
pala (पल)	60 liptā or 6 prāṇa	≈ 24 s
vighaṭi (विघटि)	60 liptā or 6 prāṇa	≈ 24 s
vināḍī (विनाडी)	60 liptā or 6 prāṇa	≈ 24 s
ghaṭi (घटि)	60 vighaṭi	≈ 1.44 ks (24 min)
nāḍī (नाडी)	60 vighaṭi	≈ 1.44 ks (24 min)
daṇḍa (दण्ड)	60 vighaṭi	≈ 1.44 ks (24 min)
muhūrta (मुहूर्त)	2 ghaṭi	≈ 2.88 ks (48 min)
nakṣatra ahorātram (sidereal day; नक्षत्र अहोरात्रम्)	60 ghaṭī	≈ 86.4 ks (24 h)
nakṣatra ahorātram (sidereal day; नक्षत्र अहोरात्रम्)	30 muhūrta	≈ 86.4 ks (24 h)

Sidereal units of time, per Sūrya Siddhānta
Unit	Definition	Value in SI units
truti	base unit	≈ 29.6 μs
tatpara	100 truti	≈ 2.96 ms
nimesha	30 tatpara	≈ 88.9 ms
kāṣṭhā	18 nimesha	≈ 1.6 s
kalā	30 kāṣṭhā	≈ 48 s
ghatika	30 kalā	≈ 1.44 ks (24 min)
muhūrta (kṣaṇa)	2 ghatika	≈ 2.88 ks (48 min)
ahorātram (sidereal day)	30 muhūrta	≈ 86.4 ks (24 h)

== Lunar metrics ==
The traditional lunar calendar system measures time based on the Moon's phases and its relation to the Sun. Unlike solar calendars, it uses units such as tithi (lunar day), pakṣa (lunar fortnight), māsa (lunar month), ṛitu (season), ayanam (half-year), and varsha (lunar year) to structure the year. This system was integral to ancient cultures for tracking time, planning festivals, and guiding agricultural practices. The following section provides an overview of these key time units and their relationships:

Lunar units of time
Unit	Definition	Equivalence
tithi (lunar day)	Time for 12° increase of longitudinal angle between Moon and Sun	≈ 1 day (varies 19–26 hours)
pakṣa (lunar fortnight)	15 tithis	≈ 15 days
māsa (lunar month)	2 pakṣas: gaura (bright) or śukla pakṣa during waxing moon; kṛṣṇa (dark) pakṣa during waning moon	≈ 30 days (29.5 days)
ṛitu (season)	2 māsas	≈ 60 days
ayanam	3 ṛitus	≈ 180 days
varsha (lunar year)	2 ayanams	≈ 360 days (354.36707 days)

== Tropical metrics ==
Tropical metrics are time units used to measure intervals based on the tropical year and related cycles. This system includes units such as ghaṭi (base unit), yāma (a period of 7.5 ghaṭis), and ahorātram (a full day comprising 8 yāmas). The following section explains these units and their approximate durations, offering insight into how time is organized in relation to the tropical year: (Note: Source (Gupta 2010, p. 6) has typo. 4 yāmas is 1/2 day.)

Tropical units of time
Unit	Definition	Equivalence
ghaṭi (घटि)	base unit	≈ 24 minutes
yāma (याम)	7.5 ghaṭis	≈ 3 hours
ahorātram (अहोरात्रम्)	8 yāmas	≈ 24 hours (tropical day starting at sunrise)

== Cosmic metrics ==
The table below contains calculations of cosmic Hindu units of time as experienced by different entities, namely humans, Pitris (forefathers), Devas (gods), Manu (progenitor of humanity), and Brahma (creator god). Calculations use a traditional 360-day year (twelve 30-day months) and a standard 24-hour day for all entities.

Cosmic units of time
Unit (Note: Calculations use a traditional 360-day year (twelve 30-day months) and a standard 24-hour day for all entities: * Brahma: creator god. * Manu: progenitor of mankind. * Devas: gods, celestials or divine. * Pitris: forefathers or ancestors. * Humans: year equals Sun's northern and southern movements in Earth's sky (a.k.a. solar or tropical year).)	Definition	Human	Pitri	Deva	Manu	Brahma
mahā-kalpa	36,000 kalpa & pralaya	311,040,000,000,000 yr	10,368,000,000,000 yr	864,000,000,000 yr	~101,408,450.70 yr	100 yr
mahā-pralaya	mahā-kalpa length	311,040,000,000,000 yr	10,368,000,000,000 yr	864,000,000,000 yr	~101,408,450.70 yr	100 yr
parārdha	1/2 mahā-kalpa	155,520,000,000,000 yr	5,184,000,000,000 yr	432,000,000,000 yr	~50,704,225.35 yr	50 yr
kalpa	14 mn + 15 mns; 1,000 cy	4,320,000,000 yr	144,000,000 yr	12,000,000 yr	~1,408.45 yr	12 h
pralaya	kalpa length	4,320,000,000 yr	144,000,000 yr	12,000,000 yr	~1,408.45 yr	12 h
manvantara [mn]	71 catur-yuga	306,720,000 yr	10,224,000 yr	852,000 yr	100 yr	51.12 min
manvantara-sandhyā [mns]	Kṛta-yuga length	1,728,000 yr	57,600 yr	4,800 yr	~6.76 mo	17.28 s
catur-yuga [cy]	Kṛta, Tretā, Dvāpara & Kali-yugas	4,320,000 yr	144,000 yr	12,000 yr	~1.41 yr	43.20 s
Kṛta-yuga	sum total	1,728,000 yr	57,600 yr	4,800 yr	~6.76 mo	17.28 s
Kṛta-yuga-sandhyā	1/10 Kṛta-yuga (Note: Main part of yuga (yuga proper); occurs after its sandhyā (dawn) and before its sandhyāṃśa (dusk).) length	144,000 yr	4,800 yr	400 yr	~16.90 day	1.44 s
Kṛta-yuga-sandhyāṃśa	1/10 Kṛta-yuga length	144,000 yr	4,800 yr	400 yr	~16.90 day	1.44 s
Kṛta-yuga	4 Kali-yuga lengths	1,440,000 yr	48,000 yr	4,000 yr	~5.63 mo	14.40 s
Tretā-yuga	sum total	1,296,000 yr	43,200 yr	3,600 yr	~5.07 mo	12.96 s
Tretā-yuga-sandhyā	1/10 Tretā-yuga length	108,000 yr	3,600 yr	300 yr	~12.68 day	1.08 s
Tretā-yuga-sandhyāṃśa	1/10 Tretā-yuga length	108,000 yr	3,600 yr	300 yr	~12.68 day	1.08 s
Tretā-yuga	3 Kali-yuga lengths	1,080,000 yr	36,000 yr	3,000 yr	~4.23 mo	10.80 s
Dvāpara-yuga	sum total	864,000 yr	28,800 yr	2,400 yr	~3.38 mo	8.64 s
Dvāpara-yuga-sandhyā	1/10 Dvāpara-yuga length	72,000 yr	2,400 yr	200 yr	~8.45 day	0.72 s
Dvāpara-yuga-sandhyāṃśa	1/10 Dvāpara-yuga length	72,000 yr	2,400 yr	200 yr	~8.45 day	0.72 s
Dvāpara-yuga	2 Kali-yuga lengths	720,000 yr	24,000 yr	2,000 yr	~2.82 mo	7.20 s
Kali-yuga	sum total	432,000 yr	14,400 yr	1,200 yr	~1.69 mo	4.32 s
Kali-yuga-sandhyā	1/10 Kali-yuga length	36,000 yr	1,200 yr	100 yr	~4.23 day	0.36 s
Kali-yuga-sandhyāṃśa	1/10 Kali-yuga length	36,000 yr	1,200 yr	100 yr	~4.23 day	0.36 s
Kali-yuga	1,000 Deva years	360,000 yr	12,000 yr	1,000 yr	~1.41 mo	3.60 s

=== Lifespans ===
Hindu texts define lifespans differently for humans, Pitris (forefathers), Devas (gods), Manus (progenitors of mankind), and Brahma (creator god). The division of a year for each is twelve 30-day months or 360 days, where a day is divided into a 12-hour day proper and 12-hour night. A 30-day month amounts to four 7-day weeks with an extra 8th day every two weeks (48-week year). A traditional human year is measured by the sun's northern (uttarayana) and southern (dakshinayana) movements in the sky, (Note: A human year is divided into twelve equal months, measured by the sun's six month movements in the north BG 8.24 and south BG 8.25, as indicated in Bhagavad-gita.) where the new year commences only when the sun returns to the same starting point and a pause on the commencement otherwise. Ebenezer Burgess postulates an intercalary month was inserted every five years to anciently maintain the correspondence of the 360-day years with the true solar years (~365.24-day years). For this reason, a traditional 360-day year is equivalent to a modern ~365.24-day solar or tropical year.

One year comparison for humans, Pitris, Devas, Manus, and Brahma
Unit	Human	Pitri	Deva	Manu	Brahma
Brahma year	3,110,400,000,000 yr	103,680,000,000 yr	8,640,000,000 yr	~1,014,084.51 yr	1 yr
Manu year	3,067,200 yr	102,240 yr	8,520 yr	1 yr	30.67 s
Deva year	360 yr	12 yr	1 yr	~1.01 h	3.60 ms
Pitri year	30 yr	1 yr	1 mo	~5.07 min	300 μs
Human year	1 yr	12 day	1 day	~10.14 s	10 μs

=== Cosmic date ===
According to Puranic sources, (Note: The Bhagavata Purana (1.18.6), Vishnu Purana (5.38.8), Brahmanda Purana (2.3.74.241), Vayu Purana (2.37.422), and Brahma Purana (2.103.8) state that the day Krishna left the earth was the day that the Dvapara Yuga ended and the Kali Yuga began) Krishna's departure marks the end of the human age of Dvapara-yuga and the start of Kali-yuga, which is dated to midnight (Ujjain meridian) 17/18 February 3102 BCE (proleptic Julian), corresponding to 22/23 January (proleptic Gregorian). We are currently halfway through Brahma's life (maha-kalpa), whose lifespan is equal to the duration of the manifested material elements, from which Brahma manifests his universe in kalpa cycles:

- 51st year of 100 (2nd half or parardha)
- 1st month of 12
- 1st kalpa (Shveta-Varaha Kalpa) of 30
- 7th manvantara (Vaivasvatha Manu) of 14
- 28th chatur-yuga of 71
- 4th yuga (Kali-yuga) of 4

A maha-kalpa is followed by a maha-pralaya (full dissolution) of equal length. Each kalpa (day of Brahma) is followed by a pralaya (night of Brahma or partial dissolution) of equal length. Preceding the first and following each manvantara is a manvantara-sandhya (connection period), each with a length of Krita-yuga (a.k.a. Satya-yuga).

Hindu texts specify that the start and end of each of the yugas are marked by astronomical alignments. This cycle's Treta-yuga began with 5 planets residing in the "Aries" constellation. This cycle's Dvapara-yuga ended with the "Saptarshi" constellation (Ursa major) residing in the "Magha" constellation. The current Kali-yuga will end with the Sun, Moon and Jupiter residing in the "Pushya" sector.

=== Human ===
The history of humanity is divided up into four yugas (a.k.a. dharmic ages or world ages)—Kṛta-yuga (pronounced Krita-yuga; a.k.a. Satya-yuga), Tretā-yuga, Dvāpara-yuga and Kali-yuga—each with a decline in dharmic practices and length, giving proportions (caraṇas; pronounced charanas) of 4:3:2:1 (e.g. Satya: 100% start; Kali: 25% start, 0% end), indicating a de-evolution in spiritual consciousness and an evolution in material consciousness. Kali-yuga is followed by Satya-yuga of the next cycle, where a cycle is called a catur-yuga (pronounced chatur-yuga; a.k.a. mahā-yuga). Each yuga is divided into a main period (a.k.a. yuga proper) and two yuga-sandhis (a.k.a. yuga-sandhyās; connecting periods)—yuga-sandhyā (dawn) and yuga-sandhyāṃśa (a.k.a. yuga-sandhyānśa; dusk)—where each yuga-sandhi lasts for 10% of the main period. Lengths are given in divine years (a.k.a. celestial or Deva years), where a divine year lasts for 360 solar (human) years. A chatur-yuga lasts for 4.32 million solar (12,000 divine) years with 1,728,000 years of Krita-yuga, 1,296,000 years of Treta-yuga, 864,000 years of Dvapara-yuga, and 432,000 years of Kali-yuga. (Note: Vishnu Purana, Book I, Ch. III)

==== Current yuga ====
Current Kali Yuga
Elapsed time
(thousands of years)

Kali-yuga lasts for 432,000 years and is the 4th of 4 yugas in a cycle as well as the current yuga, with two sandhyas, each lasting for 36,000 years: (Note: Calculations as of midnight on 17/18 February 2026 CE. Note, the number of years from 1 BCE to 1 CE is 1 year and not 2 years since there is no year zero.)

- Kali-yuga started in 3102 BCE:

= (current year + Kali-yuga start year) − year zero
= (2026 + 3102) − 1
= 5,127 years ago

- Kali-yuga-sandhya (dawn) ends in 32,899 CE:

= Kali-yuga-sandhya − elapsed Kali-yuga
= 36,000 − 5,127
= 30,873 years from now

- Kali-yuga-sandhyamsa (dusk) starts in 392,899 CE:

= (Kali-yuga − Kali-yuga-sandhyamsa) − elapsed Kali-yuga
= (432,000 − 36,000) − 5,127
= 390,873 years from now

- Kali-yuga ends in 428,899 CE:

= Kali-yuga − elapsed Kali-yuga
= 432,000 − 5,127
= 426,873 years from now

Structure of current kali yuga
Part	Start – End	Solar years	Divine years
Kali-yuga-sandhya (dawn)	3102 BCE	36,000	100
Kali-yuga (proper)	32,899 CE	360,000	1,000
Kali-yuga-sandhyamsa (dusk)	392,899–428,899 CE	36,000	100
Total		432,000	1,200

==== Current chatur yuga ====
28th chatur-yuga
(thousands of years)

A chatur-yuga lasts for 4.32 million years, where the current is the 28th of 71:

- Started in 3,891,102 BCE:

= (chatur-yuga − Kali-yuga) + elapsed Kali-yuga
= (4,320,000 − 432,000) + 5,127
= 3,893,127 years ago
≈ 3.89 million years ago

- Ends in 428,899 CE:

= Kali-yuga − elapsed Kali-yuga
= 432,000 − 5,127
= 426,873 years from now

Current chatur-yuga (Note: Each Kali-yuga-sandhi lasts for 36,000 solar (100 divine) years: * Sandhya: 3102 BCE – 32,899 CE * Sandhyamsa: 392,899–428,899 CE)
Yuga	Start – End	Solar years	Divine years
Krita (Satya)	3,891,102 BCE	1,728,000	4,800
Treta	2,163,102 BCE	1,296,000	3,600
Dvapara	867,102 BCE	864,000	2,400
Kali	3102 BCE – 428,899 CE	432,000	1,200
Total		4,320,000	12,000

=== Pitri ===
The lifespan of the Pitris (forefathers) lasts for 100 of their years.

- 24 hours (1 day & night) of Pitris = 1 solar month (masa; Moon's two 15-day fortnights: bright and dark)
- 30 days (1 month) of Pitris = 30 solar months (2.5 solar years)
- 12 months (1 year) of Pitris = 30 solar years (1 month of Devas)
- 100 years (lifespan) of Pitris = 3,000 solar years

=== Deva ===
The lifespan of the Devas (gods) lasts for 100 of their years.

- 24 hours (1 day & night) of Devas = 1 solar year (Sun's two 180-day motions: northern and southern)
- 30 days (1 month) of Devas = 30 solar years (1 year of Pitris)
- 12 months (1 year) of Devas = 360 solar years
- 100 years (lifespan) of Devas = 36,000 solar years

=== Manu ===
The lifespan of the Manus (progenitors of mankind) lasts for 100 of their years. Each Manu reigns over a period called a manvantara, each lasting for 71 chatur-yugas (306.72 million years). A total of 14 Manus reign successively in one kalpa (day of Brahma). Preceding the first and following each manvantara is a sandhyā (connection period), each lasting the duration of Satya-yuga (1.728 million years). During each manvantara-sandhyā (a.k.a. manvantara-sandhi), Earth (Bhu-loka) is submerged in water.

- 24 hours (1 day & night) of Manu = 8,520 solar years
- 30 days (1 month) of Manu = 255,600 solar years
- 12 months (1 year) of Manu = 3,067,200 solar years
- 100 years (lifespan) of Manu = 306,720,000 solar years (71 chatur-yugas)

==== Current manvantara ====
A manvantara lasts for 306.72 million years, where the current (ruled by Vaivasvatha Manu) is the 7th of 14:

- Started in the past:

= elapsed 28th chatur-yuga + 27 chatur-yugas
= (chatur-yuga − Kali-yuga) + elapsed Kali-yuga + 27 chatur-yugas
= (4,320,000 − 432,000) + 5,127 + (27 × 4,320,000)
= 120,533,127 years ago
≈ 120.53 million years ago

- Ends in the future:

= remaining 28th chatur-yuga + 43 chatur-yugas
= (Kali-yuga − elapsed Kali-yuga) + 43 chatur-yugas
= (432,000 − 5,127) + (43 × 4,320,000)
= 186,186,873 years from now
≈ 186.19 million years from now

Past chatur-yugas
Future chatur-yugas
│
│
│
│
│
│
│
│
│
│
│
│
│
│
│
│
│
│
│
│
│
│
│
│
│
│
│
│
│
│
│
│
│
│
│
│
│
│
│
│
│
│
│
│
│
│
│
│
│
│
│
│
│
│
│
│
│
│
│
│
│
│
│
│
│
│
│
│
│
│
│
│
Manvantara of Vaivasvata Manu (~120.53 – ~+186.19 Ma)
(millions of years)

=== Brahma ===
The lifespan of Brahma (creator god) lasts for 100 of his years. His 12-hour day or kalpa (a.k.a. day of Brahma) is followed by a 12-hour night or pralaya (a.k.a. night of Brahma) of equal length, each lasting for 4.32 billion years. A kalpa lasts for 1,000 chatur-yugas and has 14 manvantaras and 15 manvantara-sandhyas occurring in it. At the start of Brahma's days, he is re-born and creates the planets and the first living entities. At the end of his days, he and his creations are unmanifest (partial dissolution). His 100-year life (311.04 trillion years) is called a mahā-kalpa, which is followed by a mahā-pralaya (full dissolution) of equal length, where the bases of the universe, prakriti, is manifest at the start and unmanifest at the end of a maha-kalpa. His 100-year life is divided into two 50-year periods, each called a parārdha. In 100 360-day years (maha-kalpa), there are a total of 36,000 full days: 36,000 kalpas (days proper) and 36,000 pralayas (nights).

- 12 hours (1 day proper: kalpa) of Brahma = 4.32 billion solar years (1,000 chatur-yugas; 14 manvantaras + 15 manvantara-sandhyas)
- 24 hours (1 day & night: kalpa + pralaya) of Brahma = 8.64 billion solar years
- 30 days (1 month) of Brahma = 259.2 billion solar years
- 12 months (1 year) of Brahma = 3.1104 trillion solar years
- 50 years (parardha) of Brahma = 155.52 trillion solar years
- 100 years (lifespan: 2 parardhas) of Brahma = 311.04 trillion solar years

==== Current kalpa ====
Current kalpa
(millions of years) Manvantara-sandhyas are too short to be seen at this scale.

A kalpa (day of Brahma, 12 hours) lasts for 4.32 billion years, where the current (Shveta-Varaha Kalpa) is the 1st of 30 in his 1st month of his 51st year:

- Started in the past:

= elapsed 7th manvantara + 7 manvantara-sandhyas + 6 manvantaras
= elapsed 28th chatur-yuga + 27 chatur-yugas + 7 manvantara-sandhyas + 6 manvantaras
= (chatur-yuga − Kali-yuga) + elapsed Kali-yuga + 27 chatur-yugas + 7 manvantara-sandhyas + 6 manvantaras
= (4,320,000 − 432,000) + 5,127 + (27 × 4,320,000) + (7 × 1,728,000) + (6 × 306,720,000)
= 1,972,949,127 years ago
≈ 1.97 billion years ago

- Ends in the future:

= remaining 7th manvantara + 8 manvantara-sandhyas + 7 manvantaras
= remaining 28th chatur-yuga + 43 chatur-yugas + 8 manvantara-sandhyas + 7 manvantaras
= (Kali-yuga − elapsed Kali-yuga) + 43 chatur-yugas + 8 manvantara-sandhyas + 7 manvantaras
= (432,000 − 5,127) + (43 × 4,320,000) + (8 × 1,728,000) + (7 × 306,720,000)
= 2,347,050,873 years from now
≈ 2.35 billion years from now

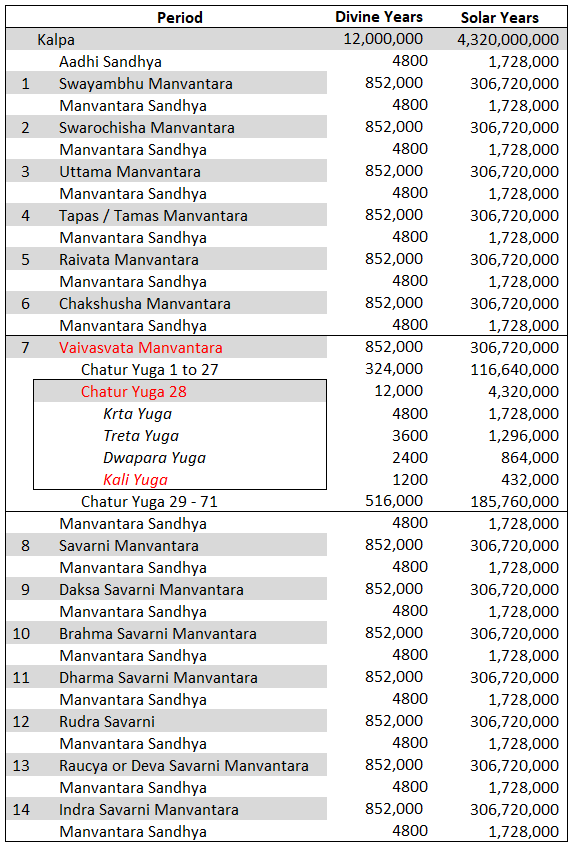
Structure of a Kalpa. Red color highlights the current period.

==== Current maha kalpa ====
A maha-kalpa (life of Brahma) lasts for 311.04 trillion years:

- Started in the past:

= elapsed 18,001st kalpa + 18,000 kalpas + 18,000 pralayas
= elapsed 7th manvantara + 7 manvantara-sandhyas + 6 manvantaras + 36,000 kalpas/pralayas
= elapsed 28th chatur-yuga + 27 chatur-yugas + 7 manvantara-sandhyas + 6 manvantaras + 36,000 kalpas/pralayas
= (chatur-yuga − Kali-yuga) + elapsed Kali-yuga + 27 chatur-yugas + 7 manvantara-sandhyas + 6 manvantaras + 36,000 kalpas/pralayas
= (4,320,000 − 432,000) + 5,127 + (27 × 4,320,000) + (7 × 1,728,000) + (6 × 306,720,000) + (36,000 × 4,320,000,000)
= 155,521,972,949,127 years ago
≈ 155.52 trillion years ago

- Ends in the future:

= remaining 18,001st kalpa + 17,999 kalpas + 18,000 pralayas
= remaining 7th manvantara + 8 manvantara-sandhyas + 7 manvantaras + 35,999 kalpas/pralayas
= remaining 28th chatur-yuga + 43 chatur-yugas + 8 manvantara-sandhyas + 7 manvantaras + 35,999 kalpas/pralayas
= (Kali-yuga − elapsed Kali-yuga) + 43 chatur-yugas + 8 manvantara-sandhyas + 7 manvantaras + 35,999 kalpas/pralayas
= (432,000 − 5,127) + (43 × 4,320,000) + (8 × 1,728,000) + (7 × 306,720,000) + (35,999 × 4,320,000,000)
= 155,518,027,050,873 years from now
≈ 155.52 trillion years from now

== Hindu texts ==
=== Mahabharata ===
The Mahabharata (12.231.12–31) describes units of time from a wink of the eye (nimesha) up to the days (kalpa) and nights (pralaya) of Brahma.

(12–13) The Rishis, measuring time, have given particular names to particular portions. Five and ten winks of the eye make what is called a Kashtha. Thirty Kashthas make what is called a Kala. Thirty Kalas, with the tenth part of a Kala, make a Muhurta. Thirty Muhurtas make up one day and night. Thirty days and nights form a month, and twelve months form a year.

(14) Persons well-read in mathematical science say that a year is made up of two solar motions, viz, the northern and the southern.

(15) The sun makes the day and the night for men. The night is for the sleep of all living creatures and the day is for work.

(16) A month of human beings is equal to a day and night of the departed manes. That division consists in this the light half of the month is their day which is for work, and the dark fortnight is their night for sleep.

(17) A year (of men) is equal to a day and night of the gods. This division consists in this the half year for which the sun travels from the vernal to the autumnal equinox is the day of the gods, and the half year for which the sun moves from the latter to the former is their night.

(18) Calculating by the days and nights of human beings about which I have told you I shall speak of the day and night of Brahman [(Brahma)] and his years also.

(19) I shall, in their order, tell you the number of years that are for different purposes calculated differently, in the Krita, the Treta, the Dwapara, and the Kali yugas.

(20) Four thousand celestial years is the duration of the first or Krita age. The morning of that cycle consists of four hundred years and its evening is of four hundred years.

(21) Regarding the other cycles, the duration of each gradually decreases by a quarter in respect of both the principal period with the minor portion and the conjoining portion itself.

(29) The learned say that these twelve thousand celestial years form what is called a cycle. A thousand such cycles form a single day of Brahman [(Brahma)].

(30) The same is the duration of Brahman's [(Brahma's)] night. With the beginning of Brahman's [(Brahma's)] day the universe begins to come into being. During the period of universal dissolution the Creator sleeps in Yoga meditation. When the period of sleep expires, He awakes.

(31) What is Brahman's [(Brahma's)] day covers a thousand such cycles. His night also covers a thousand similar cycles. They who know this are said to know the day and the night.

— Mahabharata, Book 12 (Shanti Parva), Ch. 231 (Note: Chapter 224 (CCXXIV) in some sources: Mahabharata 12.224.)

=== Manusmriti ===
The Manusmriti (a.k.a. Laws of Manu; 1.64–80) describes units of time from a twinkling of the eye (nimesha) up to the days (kalpa) and nights (pralaya) of Brahma.

निमेषा दश चाष्टौ च काष्ठा त्रिंशत् तु ताः कला ।
त्रिंशत् कला मुहूर्तः स्यादहोरात्रं तु तावतः ॥ ६४ ॥
nimeṣā daśa cāṣṭau ca kāṣṭhā triṃśat tu tāḥ kalā ।
triṃśat kalā muhūrtaḥ syādahorātraṃ tu tāvataḥ ॥ 64 ॥
(64) Eighteen nimeshas (twinklings of the eye, are one kashtha), thirty kashthas one kala, thirty kalas one muhurta, and as many (muhurtas) one day and night.

अहोरात्रे विभजते सूर्यो मानुषदैविके ।
रात्रिः स्वप्नाय भूतानां चेष्टायै कर्मणामहः ॥ ६५ ॥
ahorātre vibhajate sūryo mānuṣadaivike ।
rātriḥ svapnāya bhūtānāṃ ceṣṭāyai karmaṇāmahaḥ ॥ 65 ॥
(65) The sun divides days and nights, both human and divine, the night (being intended) for the repose of created beings and the day for exertion.

पित्र्ये रात्र्यहनी मासः प्रविभागस्तु पक्षयोः ।
कर्मचेष्टास्वहः कृष्णः शुक्लः स्वप्नाय शर्वरी ॥ ६६ ॥
pitrye rātryahanī māsaḥ pravibhāgastu pakṣayoḥ ।
karmaceṣṭāsvahaḥ kṛṣṇaḥ śuklaḥ svapnāya śarvarī ॥ 66 ॥
(66) A month is a day and night of the manes, but the division is according to fortnights. The dark (fortnight) is their day for active exertion, the bright (fortnight) their night for sleep.

दैवे रात्र्यहनी वर्षं प्रविभागस्तयोः पुनः ।
अहस्तत्रोदगयनं रात्रिः स्याद् दक्षिणायनम् ॥ ६७ ॥
daive rātryahanī varṣaṃ pravibhāgastayoḥ punaḥ ।
ahastatrodagayanaṃ rātriḥ syād dakṣiṇāyanam ॥ 67 ॥
(67) A year is a day and a night of the gods; their division is (as follows): the half year during which the sun progresses to the north will be the day, that during which it goes southwards the night.

ब्राह्मस्य तु क्षपाहस्य यत् प्रमाणं समासतः ।
एकैकशो युगानां तु क्रमशस्तन्निबोधत ॥ ६८ ॥
brāhmasya tu kṣapāhasya yat pramāṇaṃ samāsataḥ ।
ekaikaśo yugānāṃ tu kramaśastannibodhata ॥ 68 ॥
(68) But hear now the brief (description of) the duration of a night and a day of Brahman [(Brahma)] and of the several ages (of the world, yuga) according to their order.

चत्वार्याहुः सहस्राणि वर्षाणां तत् कृतं युगम् ।
तस्य तावत्शती सन्ध्या सन्ध्यांशश्च तथाविधः ॥ ६९ ॥
catvāryāhuḥ sahasrāṇi varṣāṇāṃ tat kṛtaṃ yugam ।
tasya tāvatśatī sandhyā sandhyāṃśaśca tathāvidhaḥ ॥ 69 ॥
(69) They declare that the Krita age (consists of) four thousand years (of the gods); the twilight preceding it consists of as many hundreds, and the twilight following it of the same number.

इतरेषु ससन्ध्येषु ससन्ध्यांशेषु च त्रिषु ।
एकापायेन वर्तन्ते सहस्राणि शतानि च ॥ ७० ॥
itareṣu sasandhyeṣu sasandhyāṃśeṣu ca triṣu ।
ekāpāyena vartante sahasrāṇi śatāni ca ॥ 70 ॥
(70) In the other three ages with their twilights preceding and following, the thousands and hundreds are diminished by one (in each).

यदेतत् परिसङ्ख्यातमादावेव चतुर्युगम् ।
एतद् द्वादशसाहस्रं देवानां युगमुच्यते ॥ ७१ ॥
yadetat parisaṅkhyātamādāveva caturyugam ।
etad dvādaśasāhasraṃ devānāṃ yugamucyate ॥ 71 ॥
(71) These twelve thousand (years) which thus have been just mentioned as the total of four (human) ages, are called one age of the gods.

दैविकानां युगानां तु सहस्रं परिसङ्ख्यया ।
ब्राह्ममेकमहर्ज्ञेयं तावतीं रात्रिमेव च ॥ ७२ ॥
daivikānāṃ yugānāṃ tu sahasraṃ parisaṅkhyayā ।
brāhmamekamaharjñeyaṃ tāvatīṃ rātrimeva ca ॥ 72 ॥
(72) But know that the sum of one thousand ages of the gods (makes) one day of Brahman [(Brahma)], and that his night has the same length.

तद् वै युगसहस्रान्तं ब्राह्मं पुण्यमहर्विदुः ।
रात्रिं च तावतीमेव तेऽहोरात्रविदो जनाः ॥ ७३ ॥
tad vai yugasahasrāntaṃ brāhmaṃ puṇyamaharviduḥ ।
rātriṃ ca tāvatīmeva te'horātravido janāḥ ॥ 73 ॥
(73) Those (only, who) know that the holy day of Brahman [(Brahma)], indeed, ends after (the completion of) one thousand ages (of the gods) and that his night lasts as long, (are really) men acquainted with (the length of) days and nights.

यद् प्राग् द्वादशसाहस्रमुदितं दैविकं युगम् ।
तदेकसप्ततिगुणं मन्वन्तरमिहोच्यते ॥ ७९ ॥
yad prāg dvādaśasāhasramuditaṃ daivikaṃ yugam ।
tadekasaptatiguṇaṃ manvantaramihocyate ॥ 79 ॥
(79) The before-mentioned age of the gods, (or) twelve thousand (of their years), being multiplied by seventy-one, (constitutes what) is here named the period of a Manu (Manvantara).

मन्वन्तराण्यसङ्ख्यानि सर्गः संहार एव च ।
क्रीडन्निवैतत् कुरुते परमेष्ठी पुनः पुनः ॥ ८० ॥
manvantarāṇyasaṅkhyāni sargaḥ saṃhāra eva ca ।
krīḍannivaitat kurute parameṣṭhī punaḥ punaḥ ॥ 80 ॥
(80) The Manvantaras, the creations and destructions (of the world, are) numberless; sporting, as it were, Brahman [(Brahma)] repeats this again and again.

— Manusmriti, Ch. 1

According to Patrick Olivelle, most scholars take the table of contents (1.111–118) to be an addition, but for him the account of time and cosmology (1.61–86) to the aforementioned (1.118) are out of place redactions. He feels the narrative should have ended when the initial command to "listen" (1.4) was repeated (1.60), then transition to "learn" (2.1).

Georg Bühler, whose translation has remained the standard for over a century according to Olivelle, translated 1.71 as 12,000 years in a four-aged period, same as Sir William Jones's translation, both based on Kulluka Bhatta's commentary. Medhatithi translated it as 12,000 four-aged periods in an age of the gods. Kulluka and Olivelle reject Medhatithi's interpretation based on 1.79 mentioning 12,000 without a qualifier ("etat" or "this") and must be assumed as years.

=== Surya Siddhanta ===
The Surya Siddhanta (1.10–21) describes units of time from a respiration (prana) up to the 100-year lifespan of Brahma (maha-kalpa).

lokānām antakṛt kālaḥ kālo 'nyaḥ kalanātmakaḥ ।
sa dvidhā sthūlasūkṣmatvān mūrtaś cāmūrta ucyate ॥ 10 ॥
(10) Time is the destroyer of the worlds; another Time has for its nature to bring to pass. This latter, according as it is gross or minute, is called by two names, real (murta) and unreal (amurta).

prāṇādiḥ kathito mūrtas truṭyādyo 'mūrtasaṃjñakaḥ ।
ṣaḍbhiḥ prāṇair vināḍī syāt tatṣaṣṭyā nāḍikā smṛtā ॥ 11 ॥
(11) That which begins with respirations (prana) is called real; that which begins with atoms (truti) is called unreal. Six respirations make a vinadi, sixty of these a nadi;

nāḍīṣaṣṭyā tu nākṣatram ahorātraṃ prakīrtitam ।
tattriṃśatā bhaven māsaḥ sāvano 'rkodayais tathā ॥ 12 ॥
(12) And sixty nadis make a sidereal day and night. Of thirty of these sidereal days is composed a month; a civil (savana) month consists of as many sunrises;

aindavas tithibhis tadvat saṃkrāntyā saura ucyate ।
māsair dvādaśabhir varṣaṃ divyaṃ tad aha ucyate ॥ 13 ॥
(13) A lunar month, of as many lunar days (tithi); a solar (saura) month is determined by the entrance of the sun into a sign of the zodiac : twelve months make a year. This is called a day of the gods.

surāsurāṇām anyonyam ahorātraṃ viparyayāt ।
tatṣaṣṭiḥ ṣaḍguṇā divyaṃ varṣam āsuram eva ca ॥ 14 ॥
(14) The day and night of the gods and of the demons are mutually opposed to one another. Six times sixty [360] of them are a year of the gods, and likewise of the demons.

taddvādaśasahasrāṇi caturyugam udāhṛtam ।
sūryābdasaṃkhyayā dvitrisāgarair ayutāhataiḥ ॥ 15 ॥
(15) Twelve thousand of these divine years are denominated a Quadruple Age (caturyuga); of ten thousand times four hundred and thirty-two [4,320,000] solar years

saṃdhyāsaṃdhyāṃśasahitaṃ vijñeyaṃ tac caturyugam ।
kṛtādīnāṃ vyavastheyaṃ dharmapādavyavasthayā ॥ 16 ॥
(16) Is composed that Quadruple Age, with its dawn and twilight. The difference of the Golden and the other Ages, as measured by the difference in the number of the feet of Virtue in each, is as follows:

yugasya daśamo bhāgaś catustridvyekasaṃguṇaḥ ।
kramāt kṛtayugādīnāṃ ṣaṣṭhāṃśaḥ saṃdhyayoḥ svakaḥ ॥ 17 ॥
(17) The tenth part of an Age, multiplied successively by four, three, two, and one, gives the length of the Golden and the other Ages, in order : the sixth part of each belongs to its dawn and twilight.

yugānāṃ saptatiḥ saikā manvantaram ihocyate ।
kṛtābdasaṃkhyās tasyānte saṃdhiḥ prokto jalaplavaḥ ॥ 18 ॥
(18) One and seventy [71] Ages are styled here a Patriarchate (manvantara); at its end is said to be a twilight which has the number of years of a Golden Age, and which is a deluge.

sasaṃdhayas te manavaḥ kalpe jñeyāś caturdaśa ।
kṛtapramāṇaḥ kalpādau saṃdhiḥ pañcadaśaḥ smṛtaḥ ॥ 19 ॥
(19) In an Æon (kalpa) are reckoned fourteen such Patriarchs (manu) with their respective twilights; at the commencement of the Æon is a fifteenth dawn, having the length of a Golden Age.

ittham yugasahasreṇa bhūtasaṃhārakārakaḥ ।
kalpo brāhmam ahaḥ proktaṃ śarvarī tasya tāvatī ॥ 20 ॥
(20) The Æon, thus composed of a thousand Ages, and which brings about the destruction of all that exists, is styled a day of Brahma; his night is of the same length.

paramāyuḥ śataṃ tasya tayāhorātrasaṃkhyayā ।
āyuṣo 'rdhamitaṃ tasya śeṣakalpo 'yam ādimaḥ ॥ 21 ॥
(21) His extreme age is a hundred, according to this valuation of a day and a night ...

— Surya Siddhanta, Ch. 1

== See also ==
- Age of the universe
- Hindu astronomy
- Hindu calendar
- Hindu cosmology
- Indian mathematics
- Indian science and technology
- Indian weights and measures
- Jain units of time
- Jyotishya
- List of numbers in Hindu scriptures
- Tamil months
- Tamil units of measurement
- Time in India
- Universe
- Vedanga Jyotisha
- Vedas
- Yojana
