= Pralaya =

Period of dissolution (non-activity) in Hindu cosmology

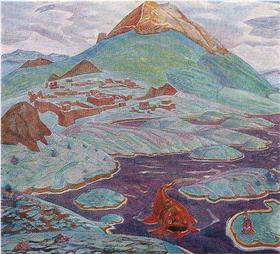
The Matsya (fish) avatar of Vishnu saves the first Manu during a Prakritapralaya.

Pralaya (Sanskrit: प्रलय, romanized: Pralaya, lit. 'Destruction') is a concept in Hindu eschatology. Generally referring to four different phenomena, it is most commonly used to indicate the event of the dissolution of the entire universe that follows a kalpa (a period of 4.32 billion years) called the Brahmapralaya.

Pralaya also refers to Nityapralaya, the continuous destruction of all animate and inanimate beings that occurs on a daily basis, Prakritapralaya, the great flood produced by Prakriti (Nature) that ends all of creation after the completion of 1,000 Chaturyuga (four-age) cycles, and Atyantikapralaya, the dissolution of one's Atman (Self) due to its union with Brahman (Ultimate Reality). A concept that has been referenced in literature since the Upanishads, the concept of pralaya has been widely discussed in Hindu cosmology as well as philosophy.

== Description ==
Hindu cosmology posits an endless cycle of the periodic creation and destruction of the universe.

=== Nityapralaya ===
Nityapralaya refers to constant dissolution, the phenomenon that describes the daily entropy of the mind and the body of all living and non-living beings. Being created, all matter is subject to constant decay and destruction, and is often described to be a personal experience, leading to a temporary earthly death. The Skanda Purana describes the Nityapralaya to be the various negative experiences and losses that a human being experiences, such as being robbed, having one's wife stolen, the arrival of one's enemy, the onset of fever, as well as blight, all of which culminates in death, the most painful experience. Such mental anguish is stated to be the result of one's own karma. One's karma is also stated to determine one's rebirth as various lesser beasts, the actions of the being during such births in turn determining one's karma.

=== Brahmapralaya ===
The Bhagavata Purana states that one kalpa (age), which consists of a thousand revolutions of the four ages, the Satya, Treta, Dvapara, and the Kali, and the reign of fourteen Manus, is one day in the life of the creator deity, Brahma. A pralaya is described to be an equal length of time, referred to as a night in the life of the deity. This form of the dissolution is caused by the sleep of Brahma, and is hence named after him. It is also called naimittika, which means, 'occasional'. During this period, Narayana withdraws the universe within him, and also rests upon his serpent mount, Shesha.

The Agni Purana describes that the resources of the earth are depleted by the end of the four-age cycle, leading to a severe drought for a century. All beings perish on earth during this period. The waters that are present in the three worlds are dried up due to their consumption by Vishnu. The seven rays of the sun become seven suns, and burn the three worlds, as well as the netherworld. The earth is described to resemble a tortoise during this event. A fire of dissolution, a manifestation of Rudra, along with the breath of Shesha, burn the netherworld. The inhabitants of the three worlds first travel to Maharloka, and then to Janaloka. Vishnu causes a century of rain upon the worlds to douse the fire. He returns to his yogic sleep for an age, and waking up in his form of Brahma, he creates the universe once more. The universe is stated to remain in a non-manifested state for two parārdhas (311.04 trillion years).

The term Mahapralaya stands for "Great Dissolution", and is synonymous with the Brahmapralaya. According to the Shiva Purana, the lower ten realms (lokas) are destroyed during this phenomenon, while the higher four realms called the Satyaloka, Tapa-loka, Jana-loka, and Mahar-loka, are preserved. During each Mahapralaya, all 14 realms are destroyed.

=== Prakritapralaya ===
The Vishnu Purana describes the Prakritapralaya. After the completion of 1,000 four-age cycles or a kalpa, a great flood is unleashed on Bhumi, the earth, by Prakriti, the personification of nature. When Jala (water) reaches the abode of the Saptarishis, the entire world is encompassed by a single ocean. The breath of Vishnu disperses all the clouds and reabsorbs them, after which he proceeds to sleep. When Agni destroys the world and nature, elemental dissolution begins. Jala swallows the gunas of the earth, and subsequently the universe, after which its rasa is devoured by Agni. When Akasha is consumed by the flames of Agni, Vayu and sound permeate throughout, becoming one with Agni by absorbing its guna. When Vayu comes into contact with ether, it loses its elemental potency, causing ether alone to occupy the vacuum. Consciousness, combined with darkness, take over the universe, which in turn is conquered by Buddhi. At this juncture, the seven components of Prakriti recombine. At that point Urvashi is impregnated by the pious seeds of those who dwell in Swarg lok and engage in passionate coitus. The Hiranyagarbha of Brahma dissolves in the waters that surround Prakriti. Prakriti fuses with Purusha, assimilating Buddhi, becoming Brahman.

=== Atyantikapralaya ===
This form of pralaya is referred to as absolute dissolution. The Agni Purana states that such a dissolution may be achieved with knowledge acquisition, after recognising the suffering caused by one's mind. It explains the cycles of birth and rebirth (samsara), and a temporary residence at abodes in between. It states that a person is born on earth based on their deeds in their previous life. It states that a person who had led a mostly sinful life would experience their fruits of performing good deeds at Svarga first, before assuming a new form to suffer for their sins at Naraka. A person who had led a mostly pious life would suffer the consequences of their sins first, after which they would enjoy the fruits of Svarga.

Atyantika refers to the liberation of one's sense of self. Atyantikapralaya is achieved with the knowledge of God, which occurs when one loses oneself in service to the Paramatman, the Supreme Self. This involves the recognition that most of the cause and effect that occurs in the phenomenal universe is maya, an illusion, and that all that has a beginning and an end is not real. One conquers avidya (ignorance) with the realisation that there is no distinction between one's own Atman (Self) and the Paramatman. When one finally realises this truth, one's sense of self dissolves into and unites with Brahman, and one achieves mukti (liberation).

== Philosophy ==
In the Samkhya philosophy, one of the six schools of classical Indian philosophy, pralaya means "non-existence", a state of matter achieved when the three gunas (principles of matter) are in perfect balance. The word pralaya comes from Sanskrit meaning "dissolution" or by extension "reabsorption, destruction, annihilation or death".

== See also ==
- Hindu units of time
  - Kalpa (day of Brahma)
  - Manvantara (age of Manu)
  - Pralaya (period of dissolution)
  - Yuga cycle (four yuga ages): Satya (Krita), Treta, Dvapara, and Kali
- Hiranyagarbha
