= Satya Yuga =

First of four yugas (ages) in Hindu cosmology

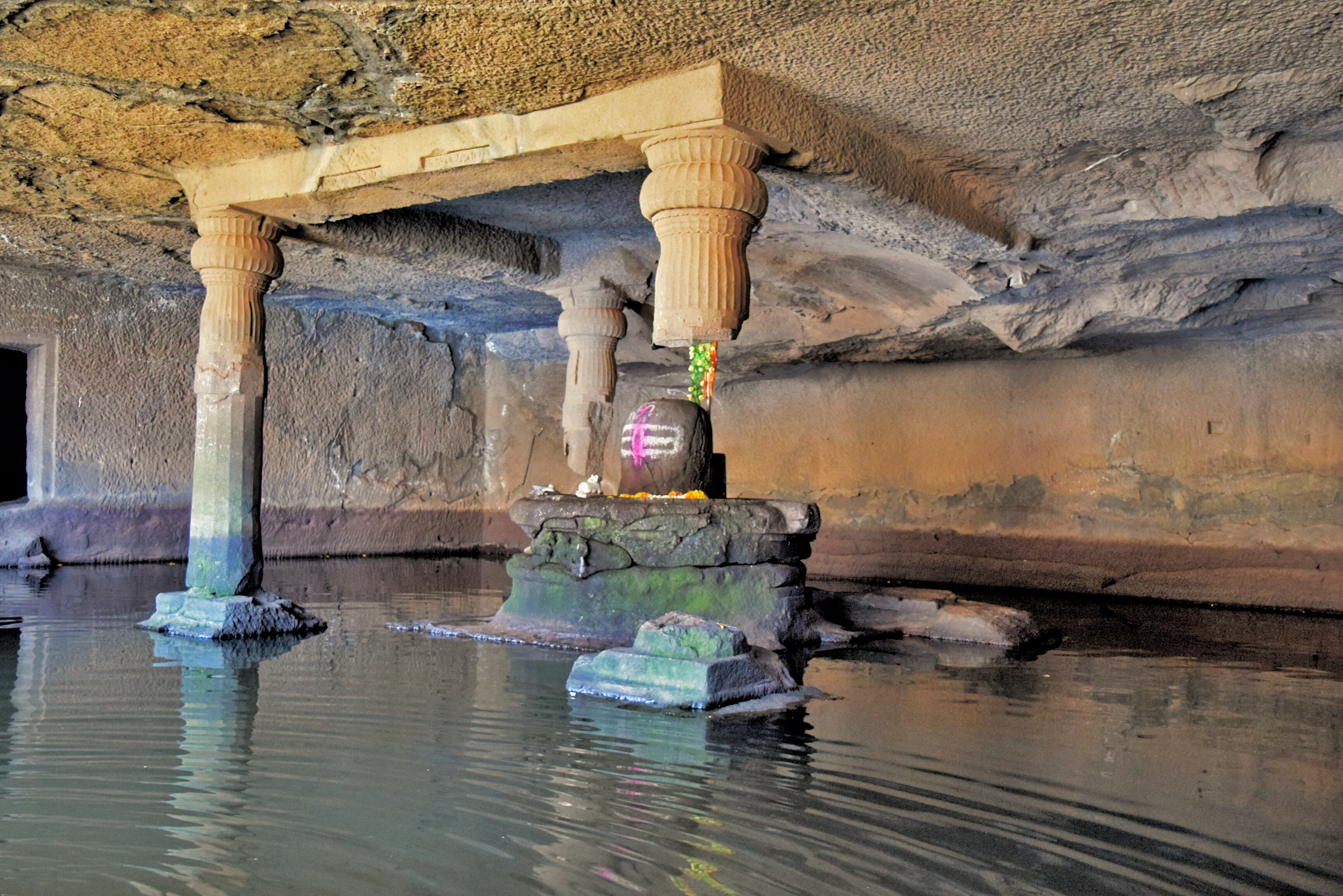
Kedareshwar Cave Temple is located at Harishchandragad, a hill fort in Ahmednagar district. Though there were four pillars surrounding the Linga, now there is only one pillar intact. Some believe the pillars to be symbols of yuga or time, namely, Satya, Treta, Dvapara, and the Kali Yuga. The temple was designed in the Hemadpanti style and is dedicated to Harishchandreshwar. The Kalachuri dynasty built this fort in the 6th century, according to locals, however, the Harishchandragad Fort caverns were discovered in the 11th century.

Satya Yuga (a.k.a. Krita Yuga, IAST: Kṛta-yuga), in Hinduism, is the first and best of the four yugas (world ages) in a Yuga Cycle, preceded by Kali Yuga of the previous cycle and followed by Treta Yuga. Satya Yuga lasts for 1,728,000 years (4,800 divine years).

Satya Yuga is known as the age of truth, when humanity is governed by gods, and every manifestation or work is close to the purest ideal and humanity will allow intrinsic goodness to rule supreme. It is sometimes referred to as the "Golden Age". Dharma (depicted in the form of a bull) symbolizes morality and stood on all four legs during this period; the legs of Dharma reduce by one in each yuga that follows. As per Bhagavata Purana, the four legs of Dharma are Tapas lit. 'austerity', Śauca lit. 'cleanliness' (or Dāna lit. 'charity'), Dayā lit. 'compassion' and Satya lit. 'truth'.

== Etymology ==
Yuga (Sanskrit: युग), in this context, means "an age of the world", where its archaic spelling is yug, with other forms of yugam, yugānāṃ, and yuge, derived from yuj (Sanskrit: युज्, lit. 'to join or yoke'), believed derived from *yeug- (Proto-Indo-European: lit. 'to join or unite').

Satya Yuga (Sanskrit: सत्ययुग, romanized: satyayuga or satya-yuga) means "the age of truth or sincerity", sometimes abbreviated as Sat Yuga or Satyuga.

Krita Yuga (Sanskrit: कृतयुग, romanized: kṛtayuga, kritayuga, kṛta-yuga, or krita-yuga), a synonym for Satya Yuga, means "the accomplished or completed age" or "the age of righteous or action", a time when people perform pious (righteous) actions, and is sometimes referred to as the "Golden Age".

Krita Yuga is described in the Mahabharata, Manusmriti, Surya Siddhanta, Vishnu Smriti, and various Puranas.

== Duration and structure ==
Hindu texts describe four yugas (world ages) in a Yuga Cycle, where, starting in order from the first age of Krita (Satya) Yuga, each yuga's length decreases according to a ratio of 4:3:2:1. Each yuga is described as having a main period (a.k.a. yuga proper) preceded by its yuga-sandhyā (dawn) and followed by its yuga-sandhyāṃśa (dusk), where each twilight (dawn/dusk) lasts for one-tenth (10%) of its main period. Lengths are given in divine years (years of the gods), each lasting for 360 solar (human) years.

Krita Yuga, the first age in a cycle, lasts for 1,728,000 years (4,800 divine years), where its main period lasts for 1,440,000 years (4,000 divine years) and its two twilights each lasts for 144,000 years (400 divine years). The current cycle's Krita Yuga has the following dates based on Kali Yuga, the fourth and present age, starting in 3102 BCE:

Structure of krita (satya) yuga in current yuga cycle
Part	Start – End	Solar years	Divine years
Krita-yuga-sandhya (dawn)	3,891,102 BCE	144,000	400
Krita-yuga (proper)	3,747,102 BCE	1,440,000	4,000
Krita-yuga-sandhyamsa (dusk)	2,307,102–2,163,102 BCE	144,000	400
Total		1,728,000	4,800

Mahabharata, Book 12 (Shanti Parva), Ch. 231: (Note: Chapter 224 (CCXXIV) in some sources: Mahabharata 12.224.)

(17) A year (of men) is equal to a day and night of the gods ... (19) I shall, in their order, tell you the number of years that are for different purposes calculated differently, in the Krita, the Treta, the Dwapara, and the Kali yugas. (20) Four thousand celestial years is the duration of the first or Krita age. The morning of that cycle consists of four hundred years and its evening is of four hundred years. (21) Regarding the other cycles, the duration of each gradually decreases by a quarter in respect of both the principal period with the minor portion and the conjoining portion itself.

Manusmriti, Ch. 1:

(67) A year is a day and a night of the gods ... (68) But hear now the brief (description of) the duration of a night and a day of Brahman [(Brahma)] and of the several ages (of the world, yuga) according to their order. (69) They declare that the Krita age (consists of) four thousand years (of the gods); the twilight preceding it consists of as many hundreds, and the twilight following it of the same number. (70) In the other three ages with their twilights preceding and following, the thousands and hundreds are diminished by one (in each).

Surya Siddhanta, Ch. 1:

(13) ... twelve months make a year. This is called a day of the gods. (14) ... Six times sixty [360] of them are a year of the gods ... (15) Twelve thousand of these divine years are denominated a Quadruple Age (caturyuga); of ten thousand times four hundred and thirty-two [4,320,000] solar years (16) Is composed that Quadruple Age, with its dawn and twilight. The difference of the Golden and the other Ages, as measured by the difference in the number of the feet of Virtue in each, is as follows : (17) The tenth part of an Age, multiplied successively by four, three, two, and one, gives the length of the Golden and the other Ages, in order : the sixth part of each belongs to its dawn and twilight.

== Characteristics ==
Among the four eras, the Satya Yuga is the first and the most significant one. Knowledge, meditation, and penance hold special importance in this era.

The Mahabharata, a Hindu epic, describes Krita Yuga as such:

Men neither bought nor sold; there were no poor and no rich; there was no need to labour, because all that men required was obtained by the power of will; the chief virtue was the abandonment of all worldly desires. The Krita Yuga was without disease; there was no lessening with the years; there was no hatred, or vanity, or evil thought whatsoever; no sorrow, no fear. All mankind could attain to supreme blessedness.

— Vana Parva

The Bhagavata Purana states that this age was characterised by the worship of one god, Vishnu; thus, demigods were reportedly not worshipped during this period and the world was united under the worship of one mantra--praṇava. Furthermore, there was only one Veda, with the Atharva Veda being divided into four parts later on, shortly before the beginning of the Kali Yuga.

== See also ==
- Hindu units of time
  - Kalpa (day of Brahma)
  - Manvantara (age of Manu)
  - Pralaya (period of dissolution)
  - Yuga cycle (four yuga ages): Satya (Krita), Treta, Dvapara, and Kali
- Itihasa (Hindu Tradition)
- List of numbers in Hindu scriptures
- Vedic-Puranic chronology
