= Yuga =

Age or era in Hinduism

A yuga, in Hinduism, is generally used to indicate an age of time.

In the Rigveda, a yuga refers to generations, a period of time (whether long or short), or a yoke (joining of two things). In the Mahabharata, the words yuga and kalpa (a day of Brahma) are used interchangeably to describe the cycle of creation and destruction.

In post-Vedic texts, the words "yuga" and "age" commonly denote a catur-yuga (pronounced chatur yuga), a cycle of four world ages—for example, in the Surya Siddhanta and Bhagavad Gita (part of the Mahabharata)—unless expressly limited by the name of one of its minor ages: Krita (Satya) Yuga, Treta Yuga, Dvapara Yuga, or Kali Yuga. (Note: The general word "yuga" is sometimes used instead of the more specific word "catur-yuga". A kalpa is described as lasting 1,000 catur-yuga in Bhagavata Purana 12.4.2 ("catur-yuga") and Bhagavad Gita 8.17 ("yuga").)

The term "yuga" can represent the number four. In early Indian astronomy, it referred to a five-year cycle starting with the conjunction of the sun and moon in the autumnal equinox.

== Etymology ==
Yuga (Sanskrit: युग) means "a yoke" (joining of two things), "generations", or "a period of time" such as an age, where its archaic spelling is yug, with other forms of yugam, yugānāṃ, and yuge, derived from yuj (Sanskrit: युज्, lit. 'to join or yoke'), believed derived from *yeug- (Proto-Indo-European: lit. 'to join or unite').

== See also ==
- Hindu units of time
  - Kalpa (day of Brahma)
  - Manvantara (age of Manu)
  - Pralaya (period of dissolution)
  - Yuga cycle (four yuga ages): Satya (Krita), Treta, Dvapara, and Kali
- List of numbers in Hindu scriptures
