= Manvantara =

Cyclic age of Manu in Hindu cosmology

A manvantara, in Hindu cosmology, is a cyclic period of time identifying the duration, reign, or age of a Manu, the progenitor of mankind. In each manvantara, seven Rishis, certain deities, an Indra, a Manu, and kings (sons of Manu) are created and perish. Each manvantara is distinguished by the Manu who rules/reigns over it, of which we are currently in the seventh manvantara of fourteen, which is ruled by Vaivasvata Manu.

== Etymology ==
Manvantara (Sanskrit: मन्वन्तर), sometimes spelled manwantara or manuantara, is a compound of manu (Sanskrit: मनु, lit. 'man, mankind, or Manu, the progenitor of mankind') and antara (Sanskrit: अन्तर, lit. 'interval, period, or term'), creating manu-antara or manvantara, literally meaning "the duration of a Manu", or his lifespan, with synonym meanings of "the interval, reign, period, or age of a Manu".

Sandhya (Sanskrit: सन्ध्या or संध्या, romanized: sandhyā or samdhyā, lit. 'union, juncture, or twilight i.e. dawn/morning or dusk/night') or sandhi (Sanskrit: सन्धि or संधि, romanized: sandhi or samdhi, lit. 'union or juncture'), sometimes with a compound of kala (Sanskrit: काल, romanized: kāla, lit. 'time'), have been used to represent "the juncture before or after a manvantara", a period of universal deluge (flood):

- manvantara sandhya (Sanskrit: मन्वन्तर सन्ध्या, romanized: manvantara-sandhyā)
- manvantara sandhi (Sanskrit: मन्वन्तर सन्धि, romanized: manvantara-sandhi)
- sandhya kala (Sanskrit: सन्ध्या काल, romanized: sandhyākāla or sandhyā-kāla) when describing a manvantara
- sandhi kala (Sanskrit: सन्धि काल, romanized: sandhikāla or sandhi-kāla) when describing a manvantara

== Duration and structure ==
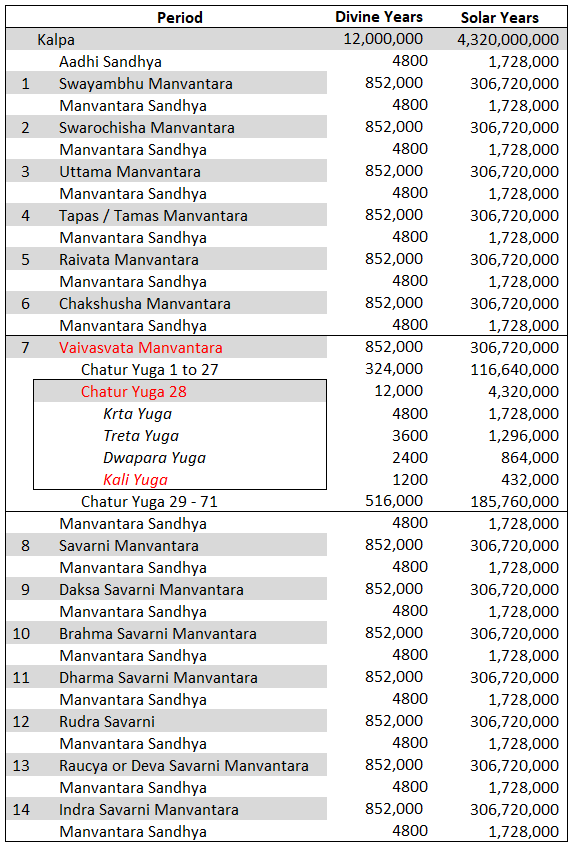
Structure of a Kalpa. Red highlights the current period.

Each manvantara lasts for 306,720,000 years (852,000 divine years; 1 divine year = 360 solar years) and repeats seventy-one Yuga cycles (world ages). In a kalpa (day of Brahma), which lasts for 4.32 billion years (12 million divine years or 1,000 Yuga cycles), there are a total of fourteen manvantaras (14 × 71 = 994 Yuga cycles), where each is followed by and the first preceded by a manvantara-sandhya (fifteen sandhyas) with each sandhya lasting for 1,728,000 years (4,800 divine years; the duration of Satya Yuga). During each manvantara-sandhya, the earth (Bhu-loka) is submerged in water.

Each kalpa has 14 manvantaras and 15 manvantara-sandhyas in the following order:

- 1st manvantara-sandhya (a.k.a. adi sandhya)
- 1st manvantara
- 2nd manvantara-sandhya
- 2nd manvantara
- ...
- 14th manvantara-sandhya
- 14th manvantara
- 15th manvantara-sandhya

Manusmriti, Ch. 1:

(67) A year is a day and a night of the gods ... (79) The before-mentioned age of the gods, (or) twelve thousand (of their years), being multiplied by seventy-one, (constitutes what) is here named the period of a Manu (Manvantara). (80) The Manvantaras, the creations and destructions (of the world, are) numberless; sporting, as it were, Brahman [(Brahma)] repeats this again and again.

Surya Siddhanta, Ch. 1:

(13) ... twelve months make a year. This is called a day of the gods. (14) ... Six times sixty [360] of them are a year of the gods ... (15) Twelve thousand of these divine years are denominated a Quadruple Age (caturyuga); of ten thousand times four hundred and thirty-two [4,320,000] solar years (18) One and seventy [71] Ages are styled here a Patriarchate (manvantara); at its end is said to be a twilight which has the number of years of a Golden Age, and which is a deluge. (19) In an Æon (kalpa) are reckoned fourteen such Patriarchs (manu) with their respective twilights; at the commencement of the Æon is a fifteenth dawn, having the length of a Golden Age.

Vishnu Purana, Part 1, Ch. 3:

Twelve thousand divine years, each composed of (three hundred and sixty) such days, constitute the period of the four Yugas, or ages ... a thousand such aggregates are a day of Brahma, and fourteen Manus reign within that term ... Seven Rishis, certain (secondary) divinities, Indra, Manu, and the kings his sons, are created and perish at one period; and the interval, called a Manwantara, is equal to seventy-one times the number of years contained in the four Yugas, with some additional years: this is the duration of the Manu, the (attendant) divinities, and the rest, which is equal to 852,000 divine years, or to 306,720,000 years of mortals, independent of the additional period. Fourteen times this period constitutes a Brahma day, that is, a day of Brahma ...

== Manus ==
In the current kalpa (day of Brahma), these fourteen Manus reign in succession:

1. Swayambhu Manu
2. Swarochisha Manu
3. Uttama Manu
4. Tapasa/Tamasa Manu
5. Raivata Manu
6. Chakshusha Manu
7. Vaivasvata Manu (current)
8. Savarni Manu
9. Daksa Savarni Manu
10. Brahma Savarni Manu
11. Dharma Savarni Manu
12. Rudra Savarni Manu
13. Raucya or Deva Savarni Manu
14. Indra Savarni Manu

== See also ==
- Itihasa
- Hindu units of time
  - Kalpa (day of Brahma)
  - Manvantara (age of Manu)
  - Pralaya (period of dissolution)
  - Yuga cycle (four yuga ages): Satya (Krita), Treta, Dvapara, and Kali
- Hindu cosmology
- List of numbers in Hindu scriptures
- Manu
- Saptarishi (Names in each manvantara)
