= Treta Yuga =

Second of four yugas (ages) in Hindu cosmology

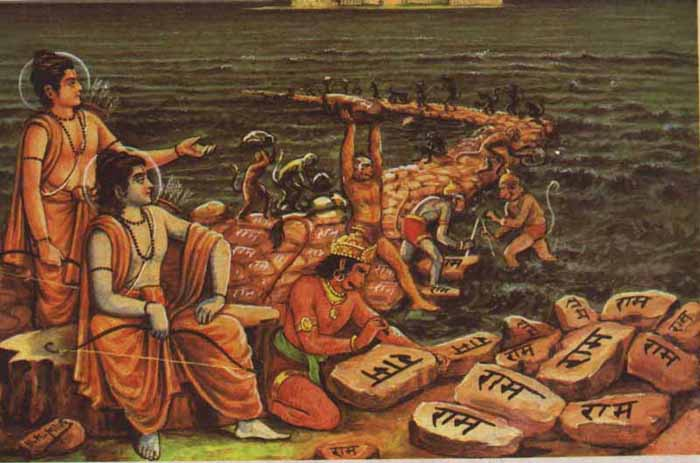
According to the Hindu belief, the events of the Ramayana took place in the Treta Yuga.

Treta Yuga (IAST: Tretā-yuga; in Devanagari: त्रेतायुग), in Hinduism, is the second and second-best of the four yugas (world ages) in a Yuga Cycle, preceded by Krita (Satya) Yuga and followed by Dvapara Yuga. Treta Yuga lasts for 1,296,000 years (3,600 divine years).

Treta means "a collection of three things" in Sanskrit, and is so called because during the Treta Yuga, there were three Avatars of Vishnu that were seen: the fifth, sixth, and seventh incarnations as Vamana, Parashurama and Rama, respectively. The bull of Dharma symbolizes that morality stood on three legs during this period. It had all four legs in the Satya Yuga and two in the succeeding Dvapara Yuga. Currently, in the immoral age of Kali, it stands on one leg.

== Etymology ==
Yuga (Sanskrit: युग), in this context, means "an age of the world", where its archaic spelling is yug, with other forms of yugam, yugānāṃ, and yuge, derived from yuj (युज्, lit. 'to join or yoke'), believed derived from *yeug- (Proto-Indo-European: lit. 'to join or unite').

Treta Yuga (त्रेतायुग, tretāyuga or tretā-yuga) means "the age of three or triads", where its length is three times that of Kali Yuga. During this period, the Dharma bull, which symbolizes morality, stands on three legs; Śauca (lit. 'cleanliness'), Dayā (lit. 'compassion ') and Satya (lit. 'truth'). (Note: The characteristics of each age has been represented in Bhagavata based on the standing of a bull which is personification of dharma. The four legs of Dharma are Tapas, Śauca (or Dāna), Dayā and Satya.)

Treta Yuga is described in the Mahabharata, Manusmriti, Surya Siddhanta, Vishnu Smriti, and various Puranas.

== Duration and structure ==
Hindu texts describe four yugas (world ages) in a Yuga Cycle, where, starting in order from the first age of Krita (Satya) Yuga, each yuga's length decreases according to a ratio of 4:3:2:1. Each yuga is described as having a main period (a.k.a. yuga proper) preceded by its yuga-sandhyā ('dawn') and followed by its yuga-sandhyāṃśa ('dusk'), where each twilight (dawn/dusk) lasts for one-tenth (10%) of its main period. Lengths are given in divine years (years of the gods), each lasting for 360 solar (human) years.

Treta Yuga, the second age in a cycle, lasts for 1,296,000 years (3,600 divine years), where its main period lasts for 1,080,000 years (3,000 divine years) and its two twilights each lasts for 108,000 years (300 divine years). The current cycle's Treta Yuga has the following dates based on Kali Yuga, the fourth and present age, starting in 3102 BCE:

Structure of treta yuga in current yuga cycle
Part	Start – End	Solar years	Divine years
Treta-yuga-sandhya (dawn)	2,163,102 BCE	108,000	300
Treta-yuga (proper)	2,055,102 BCE	1,080,000	3,000
Treta-yuga-sandhyamsa (dusk)	975,102–867,102 BCE	108,000	300
Total		1,296,000	3,600

Mahabharata, Book 12 (Shanti Parva), Ch. 231: (Note: Chapter 224 (CCXXIV) in some sources: Mahabharata 12.224.)

(17) A year (of men) is equal to a day and night of the gods ... (19) I shall, in their order, tell you the number of years that are for different purposes calculated differently, in the Krita, the Treta, the Dwapara, and the Kali yugas. (20) Four thousand celestial years is the duration of the first or Krita age. The morning of that cycle consists of four hundred years and its evening is of four hundred years. (21) Regarding the other cycles, the duration of each gradually decreases by a quarter in respect of both the principal period with the minor portion and the conjoining portion itself.

Manusmriti, Ch. 1:

(67) A year is a day and a night of the gods ... (68) But hear now the brief (description of) the duration of a night and a day of Brahman [(Brahma)] and of the several ages (of the world, yuga) according to their order. (69) They declare that the Krita age (consists of) four thousand years (of the gods); the twilight preceding it consists of as many hundreds, and the twilight following it of the same number. (70) In the other three ages with their twilights preceding and following, the thousands and hundreds are diminished by one (in each).

Surya Siddhanta, Ch. 1:

(13) ... twelve months make a year. This is called a day of the gods. (14) ... Six times sixty [360] of them are a year of the gods ... (15) Twelve thousand of these divine years are denominated a Quadruple Age (caturyuga); of ten thousand times four hundred and thirty-two [4,320,000] solar years (16) Is composed that Quadruple Age, with its dawn and twilight. The difference of the Golden and the other Ages, as measured by the difference in the number of the feet of Virtue in each, is as follows : (17) The tenth part of an Age, multiplied successively by four, three, two, and one, gives the length of the Golden and the other Ages, in order : the sixth part of each belongs to its dawn and twilight.

== Characteristics ==
Vamana, Parashurama, and Rama are believed to have lived during the Treta Yuga.

== See also ==
- Hindu units of time
  - Kalpa (day of Brahma)
  - Manvantara (age of Manu)
  - Pralaya (period of dissolution)
  - Yuga cycle (four yuga ages): Satya (Krita), Treta, Dvapara, and Kali
- Itihasa (Hindu Tradition)
- List of numbers in Hindu scriptures
- Vedic-Puranic chronology
