= Jean Robin (writer) =

French writer, essayist, and conspiracy theorist

Jean Robin (15 September 1946 – 25 December 2024), was a French writer and essayist particularly interested in occult and esoteric issues, secret societies, and their influence throughout history. He died on Christmas Day 2024.

== Biography ==
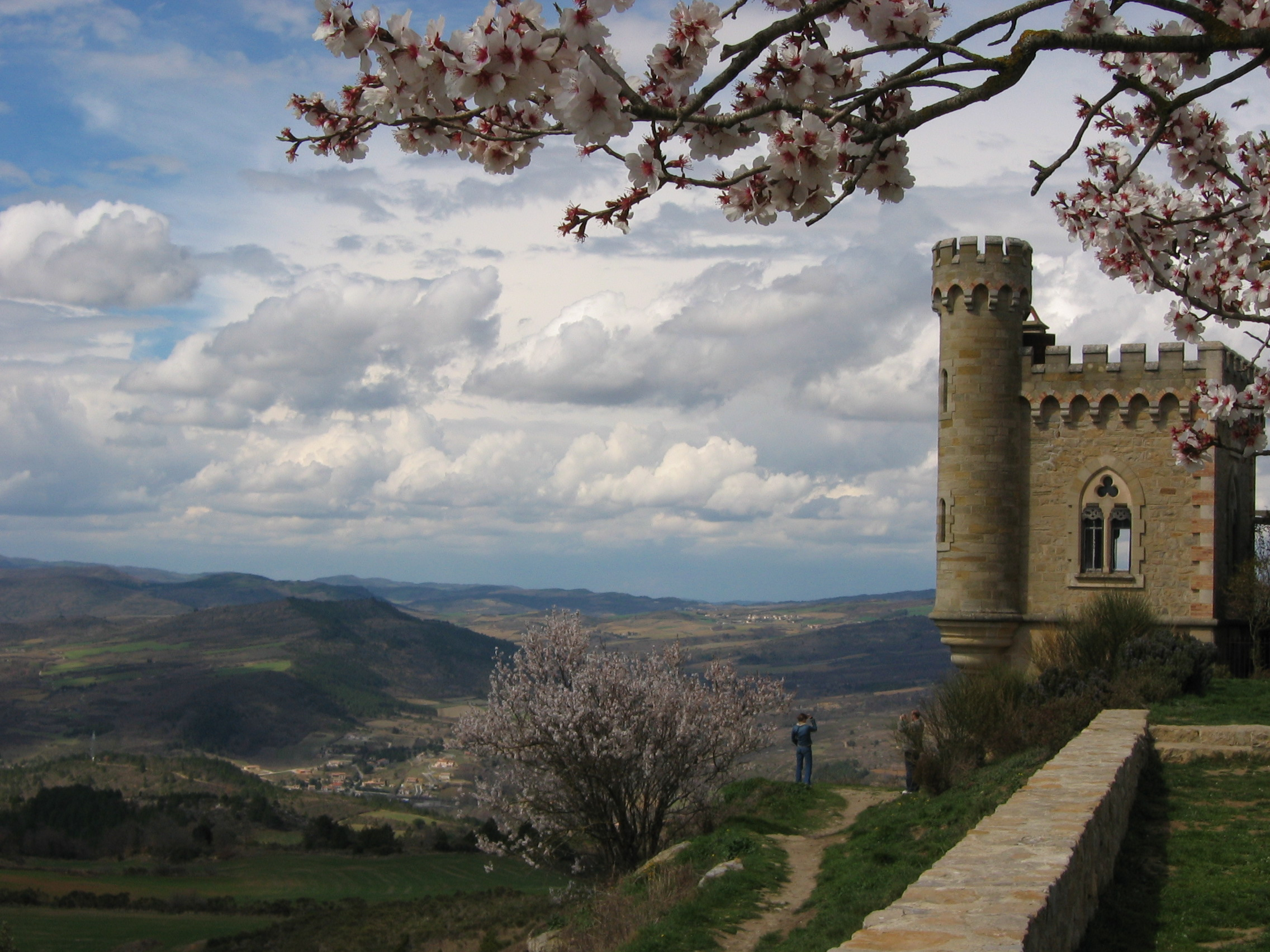
Rennes-le-Château, one of the topics explored by Jean Robin

It was at the beginning of his career at Éditions Robert Laffont that Jean Robin discovered René Guénon's writings.

He subsequently produced the text (René Guénon témoin de la Tradition, 1978), and has continued to make reference to the latter's work in other essays (Le Royaume du Graal, 1992; Veilleur, où en est la nuit (2000); H.P. Lovecraft et le secret des adorateurs du Serpent 2017).

The theme central to his work is eschatology, which refers to the events that are thought to accompany the "end of our world" or historical-cosmological cycle. It is from the point of view of eschatology and with a Guenonian approach that he writes about themes such as "so-called aliens", anti-initiation manipulation, Rennes-le-Château, occultism in Nazism, and the history of France and its mysteries.

== Adolf Hitler & Antarctica ==
Jean Robin's book Opération Orth ou l'Incroyable secret de Rennes-le-Château was published in 1989, which involved flying saucers and The Black Order. According to Jean Robin's anonymous informant in this book, Adolf Hitler died in a subterranean complex beneath Antarctica in 1953, where his body is preserved in a hexagonal casket (opposite to that of Raoul Wallenberg). The Black Order believes in Holocaust denial.

== Publications ==
=== Works ===
- René Guénon, témoin de la tradition, Paris, ed. Guy Trédaniel, 1978, ISBN 9782857070269 (reissued. Robert Laffont, 1978), 355 p.
- Les Objets volants non identifiés ou la Grande parodie, Paris, Éditions de la Maisnie, 1979, 140 p., ISBN 2-85707-038-1, translated into Spanish under the title UFO, la gran parodia.
- Réponse de Nostradamus à Monsieur de Fontbrune, Paris, Éditions de la Maisnie, 1981, 133 p., ISBN 2-85707-075-6, translated into Spanish under the title Respuesto de Nostradamus a Monsieur de Fontbrune, Esoteria (1982), ISBN 9788485411696.
- Rennes-le-Château. La colline envoûtée, Paris, Éditions de la Maisnie, 1982, ISBN 2-85-707082-9
- René Guénon. La dernière chance de l'Occident, Paris, Éditions de la Maisnie, 1983, 206 p, ISBN 9782857071020
- Les Sociétés secrètes au rendez-vous de l'Apocalypse, Paris, Guy Trédaniel and Éd. de la Maisnie, 1985, 390 p., ISBN 978-7629435604 translated into Spanish under the title Las sociedades secretas en la cita del Apocalipsis ISBN 9788478920143.
- Thèbes, Temples et Dieux du Nil, Éditions Robert Laffont, 1986, 138 p., ISBN 978-2221504291
- La véritable mission du Comte de Saint-Germain, Guy Trédaniel, 1986, 125 p., ISBN 978-2857072010
- Seth, le dieu maudit, éditions Guy Trédaniel, 1986, 249 p., ISBN 978-2857071976
- Hitler, l'élu du dragon, Paris, Éditions de la Maisnie, 1987, 239 p., ISBN 9782857072447. translated into Spanish under the title Hitler, el elegido del dragón, Colección Enigmas de la historia, Roca, 1991, ISBN 9788427015647, reissue November 2015 with a preface and an interview with the author, 314 p, Camion Noir publisher, ISBN 978-2357797307.
- Opération Orth ou l'Incroyable secret de Rennes-le-Château, Paris, Guy Trédaniel, 1989, 269 p., ISBN 978-2857073086
- Le Royaume du Graal, Introduction au mystère de la France. Éditions Trédaniel. 1992. p. 764. ISBN 978-2-85707-539-4.
- Veilleur, où en est la nuit ? Introduction à l'Apocalypse. Éditions Trédaniel. 2000. p. 344. ISBN 978-2-84445-155-2.
- Imperator, l'épopée de Julien l'Apostat, Roman historique. Éditions Trédaniel. 2013. p. 260. ISBN 978-2-8132-0574-2.
- H.P. Lovecraft et le secret des adorateurs du serpent. Paris: Éditions Trédaniel. 2017. p. 456. ISBN 978-2-8132-0990-0..

=== Magazines ===
Jean Robin has contributed to several magazines:

- Nouvelle École n° 41, Littérature et idéologie 2, Autumn 1984, René Guénon ou la Tradition retrouvée, (pp. 92–95) The article is followed by a bibliography signed N. E., of René Guénon's work and biographical studies. In it is also published an article by René Guénon published in Italian (translated by Evola or perhaps having rewritten (or synthesized) a passage from the Chaos social chapt. 6 of La Crise moderne). Translation Philippe Baillet.
- Collective work Les Cahiers de l'Herne, N°49 (1985), devoted to René Guénon: author of the article entitled Le problème du mal dans l'œuvre de René Guénon, (pp. 102–112).
- Revue L'Âge d'or, winter 1987, interview with Jean Robin about his book "Seth le dieu maudit".
