= List of numbers in Hindu scriptures =

The Hindu scriptures contain many numerical descriptions concerning distances, durations and numbers of items in the universe as seen from the perspective of Hindu cosmology.

== List ==
Property	Number or measurement
Number of the present Manu (Vaivasvata Manu)	7th Manu
Number of Manus who manifest in one kalpa (one day of Brahmā)	14
Number of planetary systems in this Brahmanda (material universe)	14
Number of Manus who manifest during one month of Brahmā	420
Steeds of Indra	1,100
Number of Manus who manifest during one year of Brahmā	5,040
Number of human species	400,000
Number of Manus who manifest during the lifetime of one Brahmā	504,000
Number of species living in the water	900,000
Number of species of birds	1,000,000
Number of species of insects and reptiles	1,100,000
Number of kinds of sthāvara (non-moving living entities such as trees and plants)	2,000,000
Number of varieties of quadrupeds	3,000,000
Number of kinds of material bodies for soul, jivaatma (or species of life) in the material world	8,400,000
Spiritual benefits of following Janmashtami Vows (fasting etc.)	One ... becomes freed from the sins of ten million births.
Happiness of liberation into impersonal Brahman (brahmajyoti) compared with happiness of devotional service to Bhagavan	Bhakti is trillion-fold better than impersonalism

=== Distance and length ===
Brahmanda – Hindu material universe. Each brahmanda appears after Mahavishnu's breathing out and when Garbhodakashayi Vishnu gives birth to Brahma on a Satyaloka's lotus. Brahma, creator of our universe lives 311,040,000,000,000 human years, and during his lifetimes, 504 000 Manus, first men, are changing. Fourteen planetary systems, Brahmanda, are created by Brahma.

Property	Number or measurement
Distance from planet Rāhu to the Sun	10,000 yojanas (80,000 miles)
Distance from lower planets to Śesha Nāga lying on the Garbhodaka Ocean	30,000 yojanas
Distance from the Earth to the lower planetary systems — Atala, Vitala, Sutala, Talātala, Mahātala, Rasātala and Pātāla	70,000 yojanas
Distance from Rāhu to planets of the Siddhas, Cāranas and Vidyādharas	1,000,000 yojanas
Distance from Dhruvaloka (the pole star) to the Sun	3,800,000 yojanas
Distance from Dhruvaloka to Maharloka	10,000,000 yojanas
Distance from Maharloka to Janaloka	20,000,000 yojanas
Distance from Satyaloka to Vishnuloka (Brahmaloka-sanatana, abode of Brahma)	26,200,000 yojanas (209,600,000 miles)
Distance from Janaloka to Tapoloka	80,000,000 yojanas
Distance from Tapoloka to Satyaloka	120,000,000 yojanas
Distance from the Sun to Satyaloka	233,800,000 yojanas (1,870,400,000 miles)
Depth of Garbhodaka ocean	249,800,000 yojanas
Covering of the Universe	260,000,000 yojanas (2,080,000,000 miles) away from the Sun, each covering layer is 10 times bigger than the previous one
Total diameter of the Universe	~500,000,000 yojanas (4,000,000,000 miles)

Note: Where distances are given in yojana a rough equivalent is sometimes given in miles calculated at 8 miles to the yojana. The actual length of the yojana varied throughout its period of use between 4 and 9 miles.

=== Time ===
Property	Duration
Lifespan of humans in Kali-yuga	~100 years; will be reduced gradually to 20 years
Lifespan of humans in Dvāpara-yuga	~1,000 years
Time passed after the beginning of Kali-yuga (Battle of Kurukṣetra)	5,126 years as of 2025 CE (See Kali Yuga)
Lifespan of humans in Tretā-yuga	~10,000 years
Lifespan of humans in Satya yuga	~100,000 years
Duration of Kali-yuga	432,000 years
Duration of Dvāpara-yuga	864,000 years
Duration of Tretā-yuga	1,296,000 years
Duration of Satya yuga	1,728,000 years
Total duration of four yugas (Satya + Treta + Dvapara + Kali)	4,320,000 years
Age of our (Vaivasvata) Manu	116,640,000 years (27 chatur-yugas)
Duration of one manvantara, the lifespan of one Manu	306,720,000 years (seventy-one chatur-yugas)
Duration of one day of Brahmā	4,320,000,000 years (1,000 chatur-yugas)
Frequency with which Krishna descends to this planet	every 8,640,000,000 years (once in a day of Brahma)
Duration of 100 years of Brahma (his lifetime duration)	311,040,000,000,000 years

== See also ==
- Kalpa (aeon)
- Manvantara
- Yuga
- Yuga Cycle
