= Dvapara Yuga =

Third of four yugas (ages) in Hindu cosmology

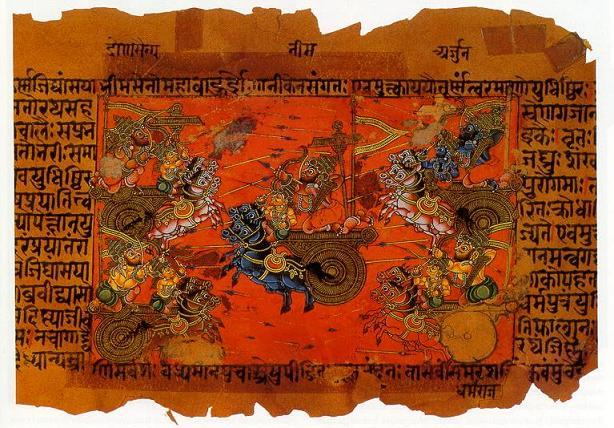
According to Hindu belief, the events of the Mahabharata took place in the Dvapara Yuga.

Dvapara Yuga (IAST: Dvāpara-yuga) (Devanagari: द्वापर युग), in Hinduism, is the third and third-best of the four yugas (world ages) in a Yuga Cycle, preceded by Treta Yuga and followed by Kali Yuga. Dvapara Yuga lasts for 864,000 years (2,400 divine years).

According to the Puranas, this yuga ended when Krishna returned to his eternal abode of Vaikuntha. There are only two pillars of religion during the Dvapara Yuga: compassion and truthfulness. Vishnu assumes the colour yellow and the Vedas are categorized into four parts: Rig Veda, Sama Veda, Yajur Veda and Atharva Veda.

== Etymology ==
Yuga (Sanskrit: युग), in this context, means "an age of the world", where its archaic spelling is yug, with other forms of yugam, yugānāṃ, and yuge, derived from yuj (Sanskrit: युज्, lit. 'to join or yoke'), believed to be derived from *yeug- (Proto-Indo-European: lit. 'to join or unite').

Dvapara (Sanskrit: द्वापर, romanized: dvāpara) is a sandhi of the two words dva (lit. two) and apara (lit. after) . Therefore Dvapara Yuga means "the age after the two", i.e. the third age. As per Bhagavata, During this age the Dharma bull, which symbolizes morality, stands on two legs; Dayā (lit. 'compassion ') and Satya (lit. 'truth'). (Note: The characteristics of each age has been represented in Bhagavata based on the standing of a bull which is personification of dharma. The four legs of Dharma are Tapas, Śauca (or Dāna), Dayā and Satya.)

Dvapara Yuga is described in the Mahabharata, Manusmriti, Surya Siddhanta, Vishnu Smriti, and various Puranas.

== Duration and structure ==
Hindu texts describe four yugas (world ages) in a Yuga Cycle, where, starting in order from the first age of Krita (Satya) Yuga, each yuga's length decreases according to a ratio of 4:3:2:1. Each yuga is described as having a main period (a.k.a. yuga proper) preceded by its yuga-sandhyā (dawn) and followed by its yuga-sandhyāṃśa (dusk), where each twilight (dawn/dusk) lasts for one-tenth (10%) of its main period. Lengths are given in divine years (years of the gods), each lasting for 360 solar (human) years.

Dvapara Yuga, the third age in a cycle, lasts for 864,000 years (2,400 divine years), where its main period lasts for 720,000 years (2,000 divine years) and its two twilights each lasts for 72,000 years (200 divine years). The current cycle's Dvapara Yuga has the following dates based on Kali Yuga, the fourth and present age, starting in 3102 BCE:

Structure of dvapara yuga in current yuga cycle
Part	Start – End	Solar years	Divine years
Dvapara-yuga-sandhya (dawn)	867,102 BCE	72,000	200
Dvapara-yuga (proper)	795,102 BCE	720,000	2,000
Dvapara-yuga-sandhyamsa (dusk)	75,102–3102 BCE	72,000	200
Total		864,000	2,400

Mahabharata, Book 12 (Shanti Parva), Ch. 231: (Note: Chapter 224 (CCXXIV) in some sources: Mahabharata 12.224.)

(17) A year (of men) is equal to a day and night of the gods ... (19) I shall, in their order, tell you the number of years that are for different purposes calculated differently, in the Krita, the Treta, the Dwapara, and the Kali yugas. (20) Four thousand celestial years is the duration of the first or Krita age. The morning of that cycle consists of four hundred years and its evening is of four hundred years. (21) Regarding the other cycles, the duration of each gradually decreases by a quarter in respect of both the principal period with the minor portion and the conjoining portion itself.

Manusmriti, Ch. 1:

(67) A year is a day and a night of the gods ... (68) But hear now the brief (description of) the duration of a night and a day of Brahman [(Brahma)] and of the several ages (of the world, yuga) according to their order. (69) They declare that the Krita age (consists of) four thousand years (of the gods); the twilight preceding it consists of as many hundreds, and the twilight following it of the same number. (70) In the other three ages with their twilights preceding and following, the thousands and hundreds are diminished by one (in each).

Surya Siddhanta, Ch. 1:

(13) ... twelve months make a year. This is called a day of the gods. (14) ... Six times sixty [360] of them are a year of the gods ... (15) Twelve thousand of these divine years are denominated a Quadruple Age (caturyuga); of ten thousand times four hundred and thirty-two [4,320,000] solar years (16) Is composed that Quadruple Age, with its dawn and twilight. The difference of the Golden and the other Ages, as measured by the difference in the number of the feet of Virtue in each, is as follows : (17) The tenth part of an Age, multiplied successively by four, three, two, and one, gives the length of the Golden and the other Ages, in order : the sixth part of each belongs to its dawn and twilight.

== Characteristics ==
All people in the Dvapara Yuga are desirous of achievement of the scriptural dharma that is prescribed to each class, valiant, courageous and competitive by nature and are engaged only in penance and charity. They are kingly and pleasure-seeking. In this era, the divine intellect ceases to exist, and it is therefore seldom that anyone is wholly truthful. As a result of this life of deceit, people are plagued by ailments, diseases and various types of desires. After suffering from these ailments, people realize their misdeeds and perform penance. Some also organize yajnas (sacred fire rituals) for material benefits as well as for divinity.

== See also ==
- Hindu units of time
  - Kalpa (day of Brahma)
  - Manvantara (age of Manu)
  - Pralaya (period of dissolution)
  - Yuga cycle (four yuga ages): Satya (Krita), Treta, Dvapara, and Kali
- Itihasa (Hindu Tradition)
- List of numbers in Hindu scriptures
- Vedic-Puranic chronology
