= Vayu Purana =

One of eighteen major Puranas

Information
- Religion: Hinduism
- Author: Vyasa
- Language: Sanskrit
- Period: 4th-5th century CE
- Verses: 12,000

The Vayu Purana (Sanskrit: वायुपुराण, Vāyu-purāṇa) is a Sanskrit text and one of the eighteen major Puranas of Hinduism. Vayu Purana is mentioned in the manuscripts of the Mahabharata and other Hindu texts, which has led scholars to propose that the text is among the oldest in the Puranic genre. Vayu and Vayaviya Puranas do share a large overlap in their structure and contents, possibly because they once were the same, but with continuous revisions over the centuries, the original text became two different texts, and the Vayaviya text came also to be known as the Brahmanda Purana.

The Vayu Purana, according to the tradition and verses in other Puranas, contains 24,000 verses (shlokas). However, the surviving manuscripts have about 12,000 verses. The text was continuously revised over the centuries, and its extant manuscripts are very different. Some manuscripts have four padas (parts) with 112 chapters, and some two khandas with 111 chapters. Comparisons of the diverse manuscripts suggest that the following sections were slipped, in later centuries, into the more ancient Vayu Purana: chapters on geography and temples-related travel guides, known as Mahatmya, two chapters on Varnas and individual, ashramas, three chapters on Dharma and penances, eleven chapters on purity and Sanskara (rite of passage) and a chapter on hell in after-life.

The text is notable for the numerous references to it, in medieval era Indian literature, likely links to inscriptions such as those found on the Mathura pillar and dated to 380 CE, as well as being a source for carvings and reliefs such as those at the Elephanta Caves – a UNESCO world heritage site.

== History ==
The Vayu Purana is mentioned in chapter 3.191 of the Mahabharata, and section 1.7 of the Harivamsa, suggesting that the text existed in the first half of the 1st-millennium CE. The 7th-century Sanskrit prose writer Banabhatta refers to this work in his Kadambari and Harshacharita. In chapter 3 of the Harshacharita Banabhatta remarks that the Vayu Purana was read out to him in his native village. Alberuni (973 -1048), the Persian scholar who visited and lived in northwest Indian subcontinent for many years in early 11th century, quoted from the version of Vayu Purana that existed during his visit.

The various mentions of the Vayu Purana in other texts have led scholars to recognize it as one of the oldest. The early 20th-century scholar Dikshitar, known for his dating proposals that push many texts as very ancient and well into 1st millennium BCE, stated that the Vayu Purana started to take shape around 350 BCE. Later scholarship has proposed that the earliest version of the text is likely from the 300 to 500 CE period, and broadly agreed that it is among the oldest Puranas.

The text, like all Puranas, has likely gone through revisions, additions and interpolations over its history. Rajendra Hazra, as well as other scholars, for example, consider Gaya-mahatmya, which is an embedded travel guide to Gaya, as a later addition. The Gaya-mahatmya replaced older sections of the Vayu Purana, sometime before the 15th century. Vayu Purana, like all Puranas, has a complicated chronology. Dimmitt and van Buitenen state that each of the Puranas is encyclopedic in style, and it is difficult to ascertain when, where, why and by whom these were written:

As they exist today, the Puranas are stratified literature. Each titled work consists of material that has grown by numerous accretions in successive historical eras. Thus, no Purana has a single date of composition. (...) It is as if they were libraries to which new volumes have been continuously added, not necessarily at the end of the shelf, but randomly.

— Cornelia Dimmitt and J.A.B. van Buitenen, Classical Hindu Mythology: A Reader in the Sanskrit Puranas

== Editions and translations ==
The Asiatic Society, Calcutta published this text in two volumes in 1880 and 1888, as a part of their Bibliotheca Indica series. It was edited by Rajendralal Mitra. The Venkateshvara Press, Bombay edition was published in 1895. It was followed by the publication of another edition by the Anandashrama (Anandashrama Sanskrit Series 49), Poona. In 1910, the Vangavasi Press, Calcutta published an edition along with a Bengali translation by Panchanan Tarkaratna, the editor of the text. In 1960 Motilal Banarsidass published an English translation as part of its Ancient Indian Traditions and Mythology series.

== Contents ==
The Yogin

The Yogin possesses these attributes,
Self-restraint,
Quiescence,
Truthfulness,
Sinlessness,
Silence,
Straightforwardness towards all,
Knowledge beyond simple perception,
Uprightness,
Composed in mind,
Absorbed in the Brahman,
Delighting in the Atman
Alert and pure.
Such are the ones who master Yoga.

— Vayu Purana 16.22-16.23

The Vayu Purana exists in many versions, structured in different ways, For example:

- In the Anandashrama and Vangavasi editions, this text is divided into four padas (parts): Prakriya-pada (chapters 1–6), Anushanga-pada (chapters 7–64), Upodghata-pada (chapter 65–99) and Upasamhara-pada (chapters 100–112). The Gayamahatmya (chapters 105–112 in these editions), praising the Gaya tirtha in Magadha is not found in all the manuscripts of this work and also found separately as an independent work.
- In the Asiatic Society and Venkateshvara Press editions, this text is divided into two parts: Prathamakhanda comprising 61 chapters and Dvitiyakhanda comprising 50 chapters. The chapters 1-6 of Prathamakhanda are titled Prakriya-pada and no title is provided for the chapters 7-61. The chapters 1-42 of Dvitiyakhanda are titled Anushanga-pada and the chapters 43-50 are the Gayamahatmya.

The Vayu Purana discusses its theories of cosmology, genealogy of gods and kings of solar and lunar dynasties, mythology, geography, manvantaras, the Solar System and the movements of the celestial bodies. In addition to these, the text has chapters which were inserted in the later centuries into the older version of the Vayu Purana, such as chapters 16-17 which discuss duties of the Varna (caste or class) and duties of a person during various ashrama, chapter 18 which discusses penances for sannyasi (monks, yati), chapters 57–59 on dharma, chapters 73 to 83 on sanskaras (rites of passage), and chapter 101 on the theory of hell in after-life.

The text shares a large number of verses with the Brahmanda Purana, and the two texts originated most likely from the same core text. The comparison of the two texts and specifics within the texts suggests, states Hazra, that the split into two texts could not have happened before 400 CE. The chapters which were slipped into the Vayu Purana are missing in many versions of Vayu and in Brahmananda manuscripts. Chapter 18 on penances for those in monastic life, was likely inserted before the 14th century. The travel guide to Gaya, Bihar was likely inserted before the 15th-century, because the Gaya-mahatmya was referenced many times by the 15th-century Vacaspatimisra (not to be confused with 9th-century Advaita scholar of the same name).

The text also contains chapters on music, various shakhas of the Vedas, Pashupata-Yoga, and geographic Mahatmya (travel guides) particularly about Gaya in Bihar. The Vayu Purana also features other topics such as those dealing with construction of mountain top Hindu temples.

The Revakhanda of Vayu Purana since 1910 has been wrongly attributed to the Skanda Purana, says Juergen Neuss, but he adds that the manuscripts attest the Revakhanda containing 232 chapters belongs to the Vayu Purana and was wrongly included in the Skanda Purana by Veṅkateśvara Steam Press in 1910 and all publications of the Skanda after it. The one belonging to the Skanda Purana has 116 chapters.
