= Vishnu Smriti =

Hindu text

Vishnu Smriti (IAST: Viṣṇu Smṛti) is one of the latest books of the Dharmaśāstra tradition in Hinduism and the only one which does not deal directly with the means of knowing dharma. The text has a strong bhakti orientation, requiring daily puja to the god Vishnu. It is also known for its handling of the controversial subject of the practice of sati (the burning of a widow on her husband's funeral pyre). A Varanasi pandit, Nandapandita, was the first to write a commentary on the Vishnu Smriti in 1622, but the book was not translated into English until 1880 by Julius Jolly.

== Source, authority and dating ==
It is commonly agreed upon that the Vishnu Smriti relies heavily on previous Dharmashastra texts, such as the Manusmriti and Yajnavalkya smrti. However, some scholars see it as a Vaishnava recast of the Kathaka Dharmasutra while others say that the Kathakagrhya and metrical verses were added later. Precise dating eludes scholars, with limits being placed anywhere between 300 BCE and 1000 CE.

According to the latest research by Olivelle, there is reason to doubt the likelihood of repeated editing and revising. He argues that the Vishnu Smriti is the work of a single Brahmin expert in the Dharmaśāstra tradition and also a devotee of Vishnu. Olivelle shows that the text was very likely composed between 700 and 1000 CE, based on several factors: 1) the centrality of written documents and events which occurred in the Common Era being cited within the text, 2) the vocabulary used (for example, the word pustaka, which was first used by a sixth-century astronomer), 3) the fact that the Vishnu Smriti is the only Dharmaśāstra to mention satī or to deal comprehensively with tīrthas, and 4) unique iconographic correlations between descriptions of Vaishnava images in the text and specimens found only after the eighth century in Kashmir.

== Structure ==
The Vishnu Smriti is divided into one hundred chapters, consisting mostly of prose text but including one or more verses at the end of each chapter. The premise of the narration is a frame story dialogue between the god Vishnu and the goddess Earth (Prithvi). This frame story remains present throughout the text, unlike many Dharmaśāstras where the simple expounding of laws takes over for the majority of the books.

The text begins when Vishnu realizes that Earth is submerged underwater. He dives in to rescue her, lifting her up out of the water and exposing her surface. Earth is grateful but worries who will continue to support her in the future. Vishnu then assures her that she should not worry because, “Good people who take delight in the conduct of the social classes and the orders of life who are totally devoted to the śāstras, O Earth, will support you. The task of caring for you is entrusted to them.” (1.47). Having been comforted, the Earth continues, asking, “Tell me, O Eternal One, the Laws of the social classes and orders of life.” (1.48-1.49). From this question, Vishnu then launches into his teachings of dharma.

== Content ==
The following is a breakdown of the subjects discussed in each of the 100 chapters of the Vishnu Smriti:

I—Vishnu and the Goddess of the Earth
II—The Four Castes
III—Duties of the King
IV—Weights and Measures
V—Criminal and Civil Law
VI—Law of Debt
VII—Writings
VIII—Witnesses
IX-XIV—Ordeals
XV-XVIII—Inheritance
XIX-XX—Funeral Ceremonies
XXI—Funeral Oblations
XXII-XXIII—Impurity
XXIV-XXVI—Women
XXVII-XXXII—Sacraments
XXXIII-XLII—Crimes
XLIII—Hells
XLIV-XLV—Transmigration
XLVI-LVII—Penances
LVIII-LXX—Duties of a Householder
LXXI—Rules for a Snātaka
LXXII—Self-restraint
LXXIII-LXXXVI—Śrāddhas
LXXXVII-XCIII—Pious Gifts
XCIV-XCV—The Hermit
XCVI—The Ascetic
XCVII—Meditation on Vishnu
XCVIII-C—Conclusion
