= Kos (unit) =

Ancient Indian unit of distance

- Unit system: Arthashastra
- Unit of: length
- Symbol: kos

Conversions
1 kos in ...	... is equal to ...
- SI units: 3075 m
- imperial/US units: 1.9 mi 656 ft

The kos (Hindi: कोस), also spelled coss, koss, kosh, koh (in Punjabi), krosh, and krosha, is a unit of measurement which is derived from a Sanskrit term, क्रोश krośa, which means a 'call', as the unit was supposed to represent the distance at which another human could be heard. It is an ancient Indian subcontinental standard unit of distance, in use since at least 4 BCE. According to the Arthashastra, a krośa or kos is about 3,000 metres (9,800 ft).

Another conversion is based on the Mughal emperor Akbar, who standardized the unit to 5000 guz in the Ain-i-Akbari. The British in India standardized Akbar's guz to 33 inches (840 mm), making the kos approximately 4,191 metres (13,750 ft). Another conversion suggested a kos to be approximately 2 English miles.

A related unit is the gavyuti (also called gow, gaou/gau, gorutam, gāvuta, gavuva, and gavi), said to be equal to the distance at which a cow's call can be heard. This length is usually considered synonymous with the kos, being translated as the equivalent of a western league, though some systems do reckon them to be different (e.g. in the Arthashastra and in Burmese units).

== Arthashastra Standard units ==
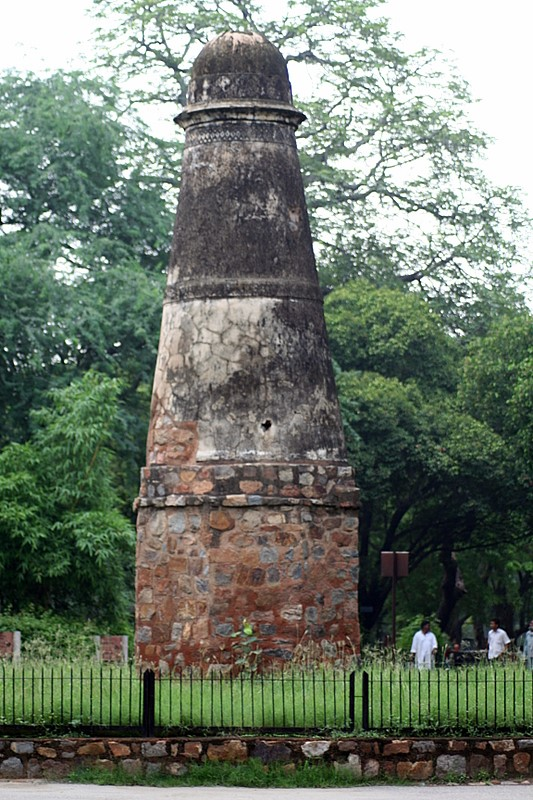
Kos Minar in Delhi

The "Arthashastra: Chapter XX. "Measurement of space and time", authored in 4th century BC by Chanakya (also known as Vishnugupta or Kauṭilya), sets this standard breakup of Indian units of length:

- 1 angul (approximate width of a finger) = approx. 3/4 of an inch (19 mm)
- 4 angul = 1 dhanurgrah (bow grip) = 3 inches (76 mm)
- 8 angul = 1 dhanurmushti (fist with thumb raised) = 6 inches (150 mm)
- 12 angul = 1 vitastaa (span-distance of stretched out palm between the tips of a person's thumb and the little finger) = 9 inches (230 mm)
- 2 vitastaa (from the tip of the elbow to the tip of the middle finger) = 1 aratni or hast (cubit or haath) = 18 inches (460 mm)
- 4 aratni (haath) = 1 dand or dhanush (bow) = 6 feet (1.8 m);
- 10 dand = 1 rajju = 60 feet (18 m)
- 2 rajju = 1 paridesh = 120 feet (37 m)
- 10 rajju = 1 goruta = 219 yards (1/8 mi; 200 m)
- 10 goruta= 1 krosha/kos = nearly 3,350 yards (3,060 metres; 1.90 miles)

== Conversion to SI units and imperial units ==
Kos may also refer to roughly 1.8 kilometres (1.1 mi) Arthashastra standard unit of kos or krosha is equal to 3075 metres in SI units and 1.91 miles in imperial units.

== Usage of kos ==
Evidence of official usage exists from the Vedic period to the Mughal era. Elderly people in many rural areas of the Indian subcontinent still refer to distances from nearby areas in kos. Most Hindu religious Parikrama circuits are measured in kos, such as 48 kos parikrama of Kurukshetra. Along India's old highways, particularly the Grand Trunk Road, one still finds 16th to early 18th century Kos Minars, or mile markers, erected at distances of a little over two miles.

== See also ==
- Measurement
  - Hasta, unit of smaller distance
  - Yojana, unit of longer distance
  - Palya, unit of time
  - Vedic metre, measurement of rhythmic structure of verses
  - Hindu units of time
  - Indian weights and measures
  - History of measurement systems in India
- Other related
  - Hindu astronomy
  - Hindu calendar
  - Hindu cosmology
  - Indian mathematics
  - Indian science and technology
  - List of numbers in Hindu scriptures
