= Khalid Javaid Ghurki =

Pakistani politician

- خالد جاوید گھرکی
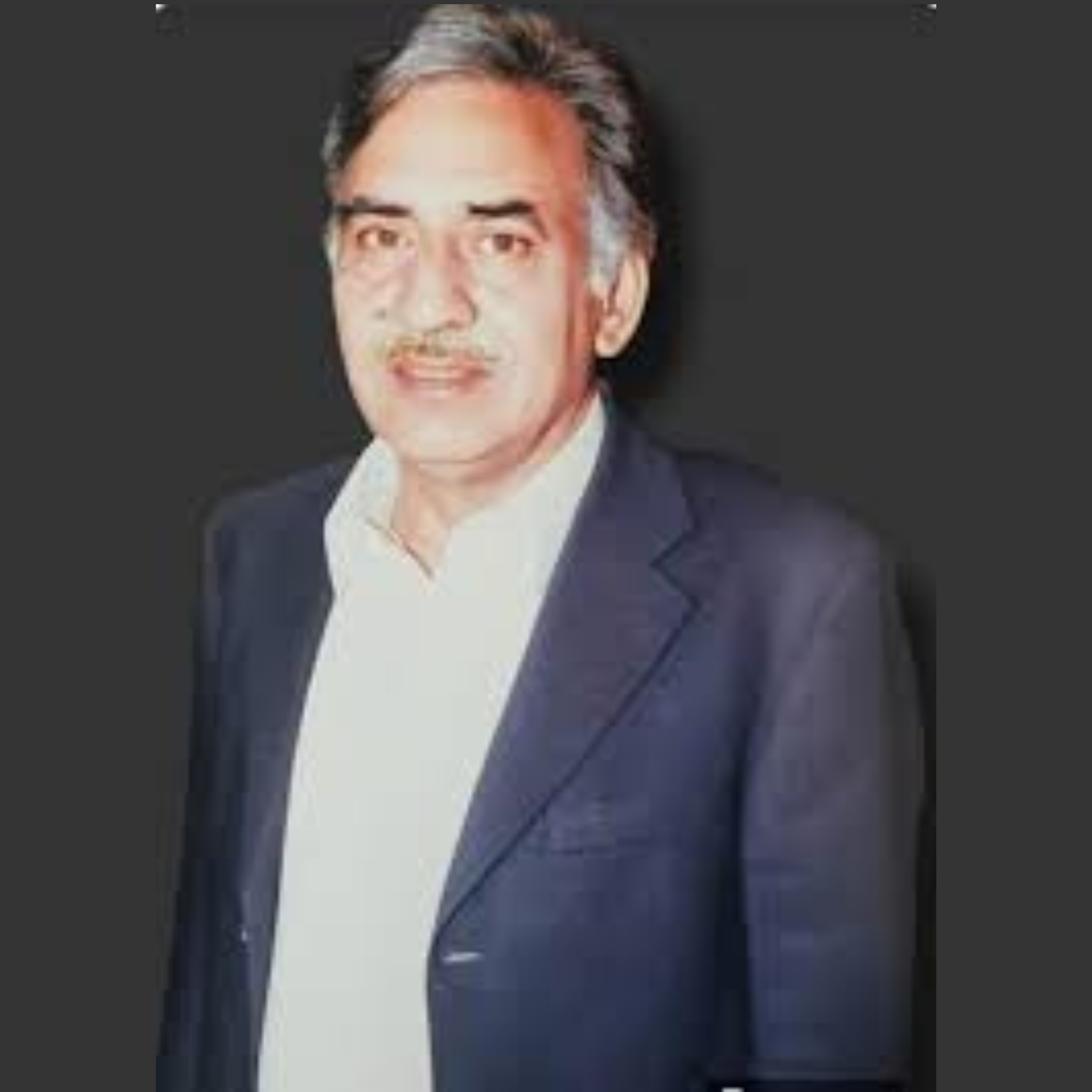
- President: Ghurki Trust Teaching Hospital

Member of the National Assembly of Pakistan
- In office 15 October 1993 – 5 November 1996
- Constituency: NA-100 (Lahore-IX)

Nazim of Wagah Town, Lahore
- In office October 2005 – 2009
- Preceded by: (position established)
- Succeeded by: (position abolished)

Personal details
- Born: c. 1955 Ghurki, Manhala Road, Lahore, Pakistan
- Died: 8 March 2011 (aged 60–61) Lahore, Punjab, Pakistan
- Resting place: Ghurki, Manhala Road, Lahore
- Party: Pakistan Peoples Party
- Spouse: Samina Khalid Ghurki
- Children: 4
- Parent: Haji Asghar Ghurki

Khalid Javaid Ghurki (c. 1955 – 8 March 2011) was a Pakistani politician affiliated with the Pakistan Peoples Party (PPP). He served as a Member of the National Assembly of Pakistan from 1993 to 1996 and as Nazim (mayor) of Wagah Town, Lahore from 2005 to 2009. Known for his role in Lahore's local politics and his association with PPP leaders Benazir Bhutto and Asif Ali Zardari, he was also involved in philanthropic work through the Ghurki Trust Teaching Hospital. Ghurki died in 2011 at the age of 60.

== Early life and family ==
Khalid Ghurki was born in Ghurki, a village on the outskirts of Lahore near the Manhala Road in Punjab. The Ghurki family is part of the Arain community and has lent its name to the village; its members customarily adopt "Ghurki" as a surname.

His father, Haji Muhammad Asghar Ghurki was the founder of Ghurki Trust Teaching Hospital. He was known as a gold trader, along with his brothers Yousaf Ghurki (late) and Younas Ghurki (late). He was also active in politics and was a prominent local figure who served as a Member of National Assembly in 1985 and 1988. His elder brother Arshad Ghurki was elected from the same constituency in a by-election and also served in the assembly.

The family is associated with the Ghurki Trust Teaching Hospital, founded in 1997 to provide charitable healthcare.

He and his wife, Samina Khalid Ghurki, a PPP politician and federal minister, had four children: two sons and two daughters.

== Political career ==
=== PPP and National Assembly ===
Ghurki entered politics in the late 1980s when former Prime Minister Benazir Bhutto returned to Pakistan from exile.

In 1989, he was elected president of the PPP Lahore chapter and held the office until 1991. He became known as a loyal supporter of Benazir Bhutto and a close associate of Asif Ali Zardari.

In the 1993 general elections, he was elected to the National Assembly from NA-100 (Lahore-IX) on a PPP ticket. He won by a margin of only 71 votes over rival Ashiq Dayal, in what was the only seat in Lahore not won by the Pakistan Muslim League (N) at that election. After being appointed by Benazir Bhutto, he served as Parliamentary Secretary for Railways during his tenure. He was noted for being a strong orator in Punjabi.

He contested the 1997 general elections but lost, as PPP was swept out by PML-N in Punjab.

During his political career, Ghurki faced personal hardship; he lost one leg in an accidental firing at Jehangir Badr’s residence when he was serving as PPP Lahore President.

=== Nazim of Wagah Town ===
In October 2005, Ghurki was elected as Nazim (mayor) of Wagah Town, Lahore, as an opposition-backed candidate, defeating the pro-government PML-Q candidate Ijaz Ahmad Dayal by 82 votes to 71. He served until 2009, voicing concerns over lack of funding and police support for development initiatives in his town. He was the only opposition Nazim in Lahore at the time.

=== Later role in PPP ===
By the 2000s, new laws requiring a university degree made him ineligible to contest parliamentary elections. His wife Samina successfully contested NA-130 in 2002 and 2008, serving as a federal minister. Khalid continued to play a role in PPP politics as an advisor and elder statesman, maintaining close ties with Asif Ali Zardari.

== Philanthropy ==
Khalid Ghurki was a trustee of the Ghurki Trust Teaching Hospital in Lahore, which provides affordable healthcare to underprivileged communities. The hospital was established by his family in memory of his father, Haji Muhammad Asghar Ghurki, and has grown into a major teaching hospital serving thousands of patients annually.

== Death ==
Khalid Ghurki suffered from kidney disease and underwent treatment at Lahore's Shaikh Zayed Hospital. He died on 8 March 2011 due to renal failure, at the age of 60. His funeral prayers were held in Lahore and he was buried in his ancestral village of Ghurki, Wagah. President Asif Ali Zardari called him a "loyal colleague and friend," and postponed a PPP Punjab meeting in his honor. Prime Minister Yousaf Raza Gillani cancelled a federal cabinet meeting so members could attend his funeral.

== Legacy ==
Khalid Ghurki is remembered as a key PPP figure in Lahore's rural areas and the only opposition Nazim of Lahore in 2005. His wife Samina Khalid Ghurki carried forward his political legacy, serving as a federal minister and later PPP Punjab leader. The Ghurki Trust Teaching Hospital continues to honor the family’s commitment to social service.

== See also ==
- Samina Khalid Ghurki
- Ghurki Trust Teaching Hospital
- Pakistan Peoples Party
