= Ghurki =

Ghurki (Urdu: گھرکی ) may refer to:

== People with this surname ==
- Samina Khalid Ghurki (born 1956), Pakistani politician of the Pakistan Peoples Party

== Places ==
- Ghurki, Pakistan, village on the outskirts of Lahore, Punjab, Pakistan
