= Bhori =

Unit of mass in South Asia

- Unit system: Indian
- Unit of: mass (particularly for gold and silver jewellery)
- Symbol: bhori

Conversions
1 bhori in ...	... is equal to ...
- grams: 11.664 (in India, Bangladesh and Nepal); 12.5 (in Pakistan)

Conversions (imperial)
1 imp bhori in ...	... is equal to ...
- ounces: 0.4114 (in India, Bangladesh and Nepal); 0.4409 (in Pakistan)
- troy ounces: 0.3750 (in India, Bangladesh and Nepal); 0.4019 (in Pakistan)

The bhori (Bengali: ভরি, Gujarati: ભોરી, Marathi: भोरी) is a common unit of measurement for gold or silver jewellery in India, Bangladesh, Nepal and Pakistan. In India, Bangladesh and Nepal, 1 bhori of 22 carat gold is equal to 11.664 g (0.4114 oz; 0.3750 ozt), while in Pakistan it's 12.5 g (0.4409 oz; 0.4019 ozt). It's used along with a more standardised unit tola, and is roughly equal to 1 tola.

== Measurements ==
In ancient times, the unit of bhori was valued as the equivalent of 1 tanka, or in the regional languages, paisa. Subunits of bhori include ana (1 bhori is equal to 16 ana), ratti (1 bhori is equal to 96 ratti), and point (1 bhori is equal to 960 points).

== Use ==
The term bhori is used in many parts of the Indian subcontinent for jewellery. In Bangladesh, gold jewelry is sold in units of bhori in jewellery stores. The term is also widespread in India, particularly in the states of Gujarat and Maharashtra.

Bhori is considered versatile and economically affordable unit for jewellery measurements in South Asia. The term also carries a cultural significance due to widespread use of gold in the festivals in the region, as it is perceived as a "practical choice for creating traditional jewellery pieces that are both culturally significant and economically feasible".

South Asian Muslims also calculate the zakat threshold (nisab) for gold and silver using bhori, which is roughly equivalent to 7.5 bhori in India, Bangladesh and Nepal and 7 bhori in Pakistan.

Tola is a standardised unit for mass in South Asia which is a popular denomination for gold bullion bars. 1 Tola is equal to 180 grains (11.6638038 g), which is almost same for bhori without some regional variations. In India and Pakistan, the terms tola and bhori may be used interchangeably.

== Price ==
The price of one bhori gold is not constant and continually changed due to various domestic and international factors.

== See also ==
- Indian units of measurement
- List of customary units of measurement in South Asia
  - Tola (unit)
  - Ratti (unit)
- Carat (mass)
