= Masha (unit) =

Mass unit

A masha is a traditional Indian unit of mass, now standardized as 0.972 grams (0.0343 oz).

The essential units of mass used in India included ratti, masha, tola, chattank, seer and maund.

Grain is usually taken is rice
8 grains of rice = 1 Ratti
8 Ratti = 1 Masha
12 Masha = 1 Tola
5 Tola = 1 chatank
16 chatank = 1 Seer

40 seer = 1 maund
1 seer = 933.12 g

1 maund = 37.325 kg (now a day says 40 kg= 1maund)
25 Mann = 1 Ton (1000 KG)
Before "rice" is "khas khas", that is poppyseed. It is "8 khaskhas = 1 chawal(rice)".
