= Kos Minar =

Medieval Indian monuments

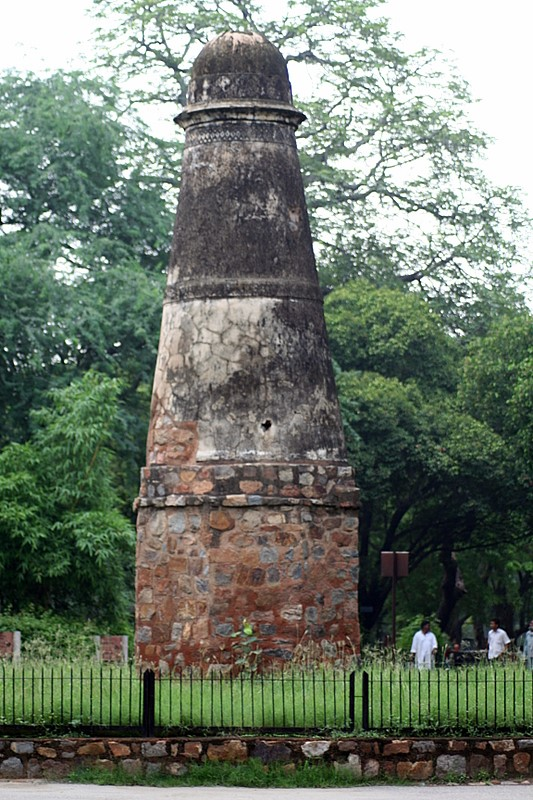
Kos Minar in the National Zoological Park Delhi, India

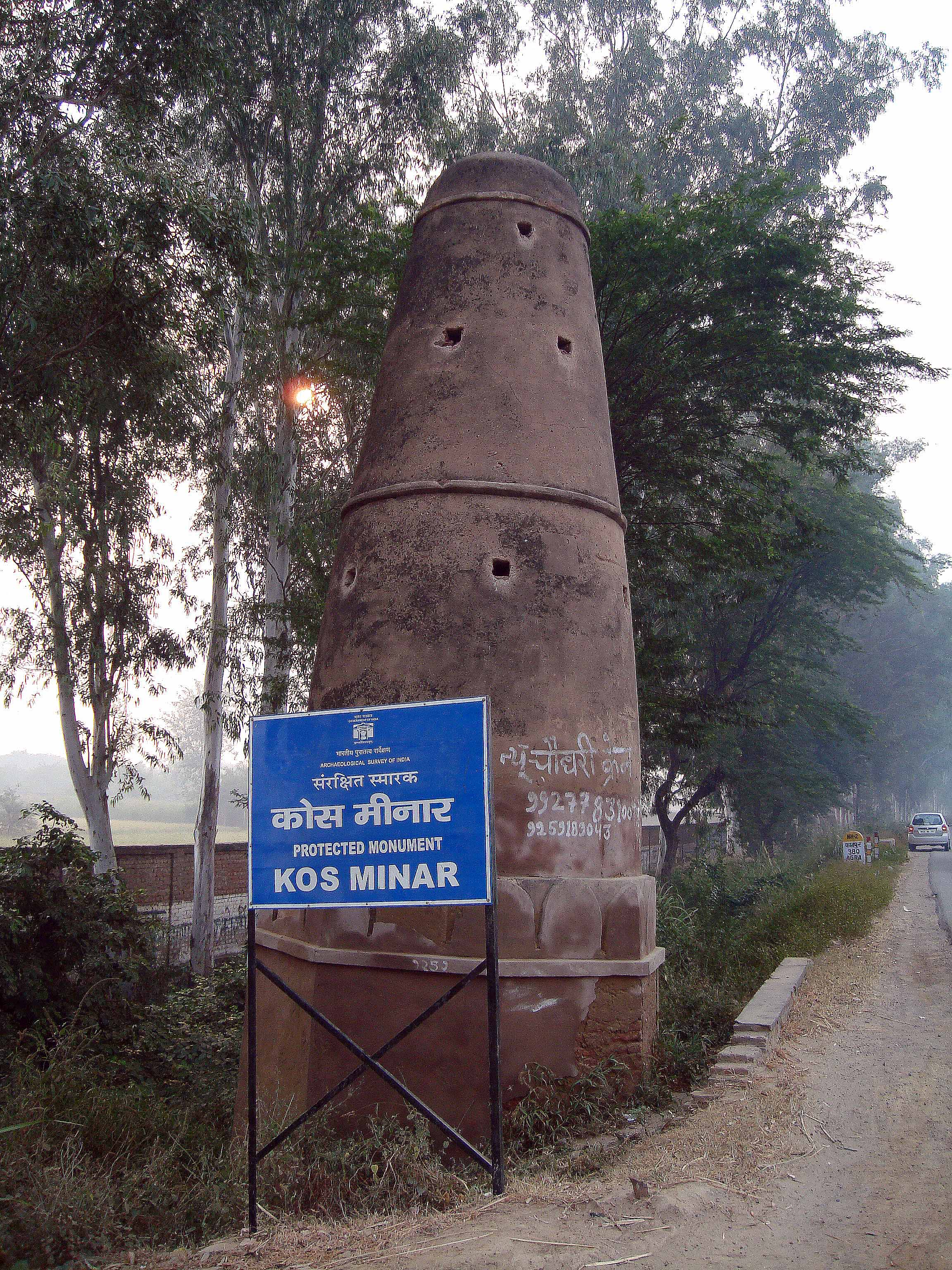
Kos minar at Palwal along Grand Trunk Road in Haryana, India. Haryana has the highest number of surviving Kos Minars.

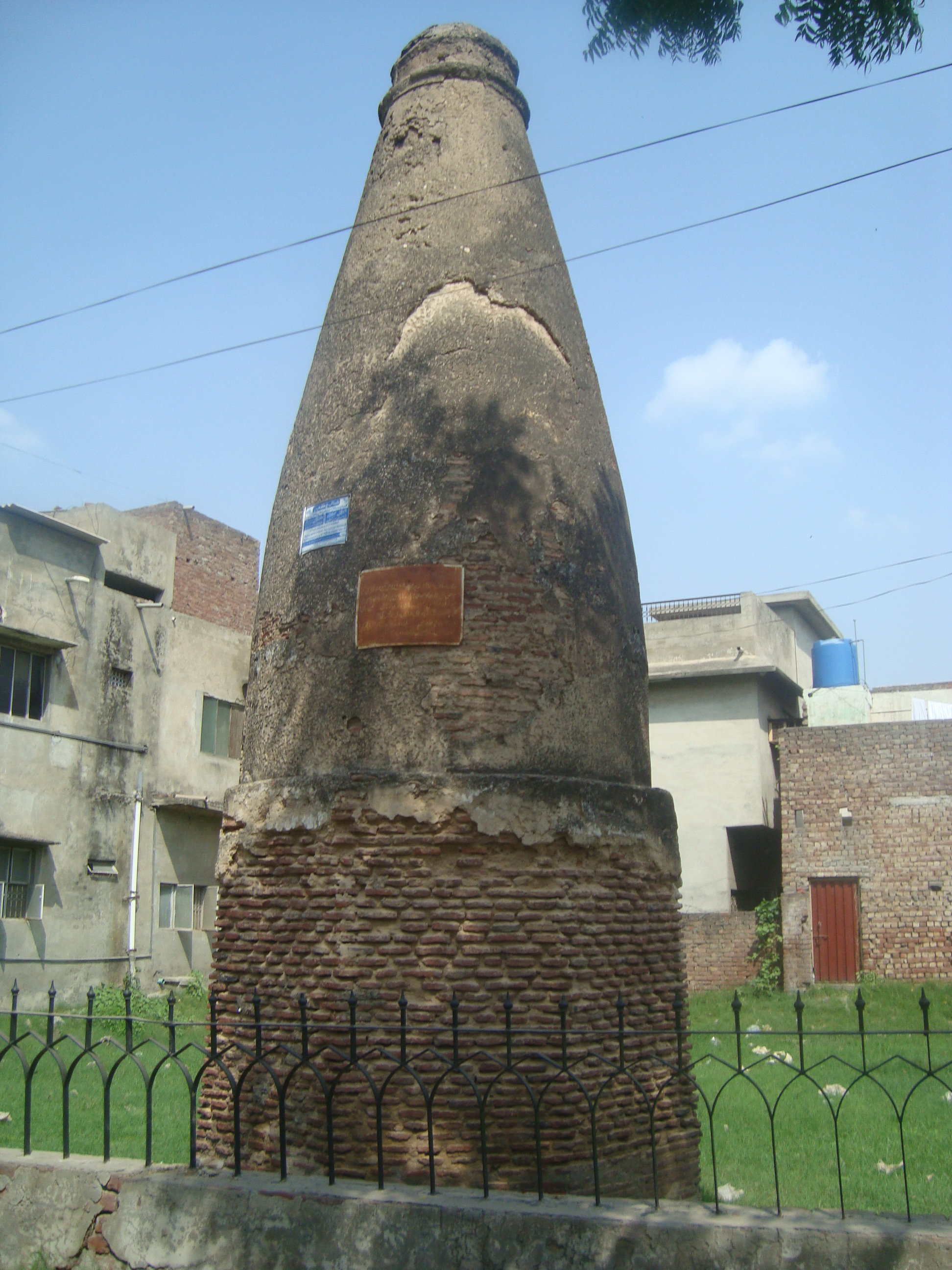
Kos Minar built with lakhori bricks near the Tomb of Ali Mardan Khan in Lahore, Pakistan

The Kos Minars (translated: Mile Pillars) are medieval Indian milestones along the Grand Trunk Road on the northern Indian subcontinent that were introduced by the 16th-century Pashtun ruler Sher Shah Suri of the Sur Empire. Kos Minars were erected to serve as markers of distance along royal routes from Agra to Ajmer, Agra to Lahore, and from Agra to Mandu in the south.

Most of the Kos Minars are present in Uttar Pradesh, Rajasthan, Madhya Pradesh, Haryana, and Punjab by the roadsides, railway tracks, paddy fields and in many towns and villages.

Kos Minars were described as a "marvel of India" by early European travellers such as Sir Thomas Roe and have been labeled as an integral part of India's "national communication system" by Archaeological Survey of India.

== Characteristics ==
A kos in Sanskrit is one fourth of a yojana, an ancient Indian unit of distance. It represented a distance of approximately 3.22 kilometres (2.00 mi). A kos length of approximately 4.2 kilometres (2.6 mi) was documented in a case study from Punjab. Minar is an Arabic word for tower, related to minaret.

Kos Minars are solid round pillars, around 30 feet (9.1 m) in height, on a masonry platform built with bricks and plastered over with lime. They are not identical. As milestones, they were an important part of communication and travel.

== History ==
=== Maurya period ===
In the third century BC, emperor Ashoka improved existing routes linking his capital city Pataliputra to Dhaka in the east and Kabul via Peshawar in the west and further to Balkh. These routes had landmarks in the form of mud pillars, trees or wells to guide commuters.

=== Sur period ===
The 16th-century Pashtun ruler Sher Shah Suri introduced improved brick pillars plastered over with lime at every kos. The minars thus came to be called as Kos minars.

=== Mughal period ===
Abul Fazl recorded in Akbar Nama that in the year 1575 AD, Akbar issued an order that, at every kos on the way from Agra to Ajmer, a pillar or a minar should be erected for the comfort of the travelers. In addition, many caravanserais (roadside inns) were built for travelers. Later emperors such as Shah Jahan continued to add to the network of Kos Minars. In the Mughal period, there were around 600 minars. In the north, they were extended as far as Peshawar and in the east to Bengal via Kannauj.

=== Deterioration and preservation ===
As the British introduced Imperial units and later, independent India adopted the International System of Units, the kos unit of measurement and consequently these minars went out of use. The monuments gradually went into a state of disrepair, as contemporary people ignored their significance. Only 110 Kos minars are left. According to a report of the Archaeology Survey of India, there are 49 in Haryana alone. There are also seven Kos Minars in Jalandhar district and five around Ludhiana district in Punjab. A study documented eight surviving Kos Minars in Tarn Taran district of Punjab.Conservation work of Kos Minars situated in Jalandhar district started in 2016. Grill fencing was erected at each minar to protect the original structure of Minar. Restoration work for nine Kos Minars near Mathura began in 2018. The Archaeological Survey of India has given Kos Minars protected status and courts have ordered encroachments cleared away.

== Gallery ==
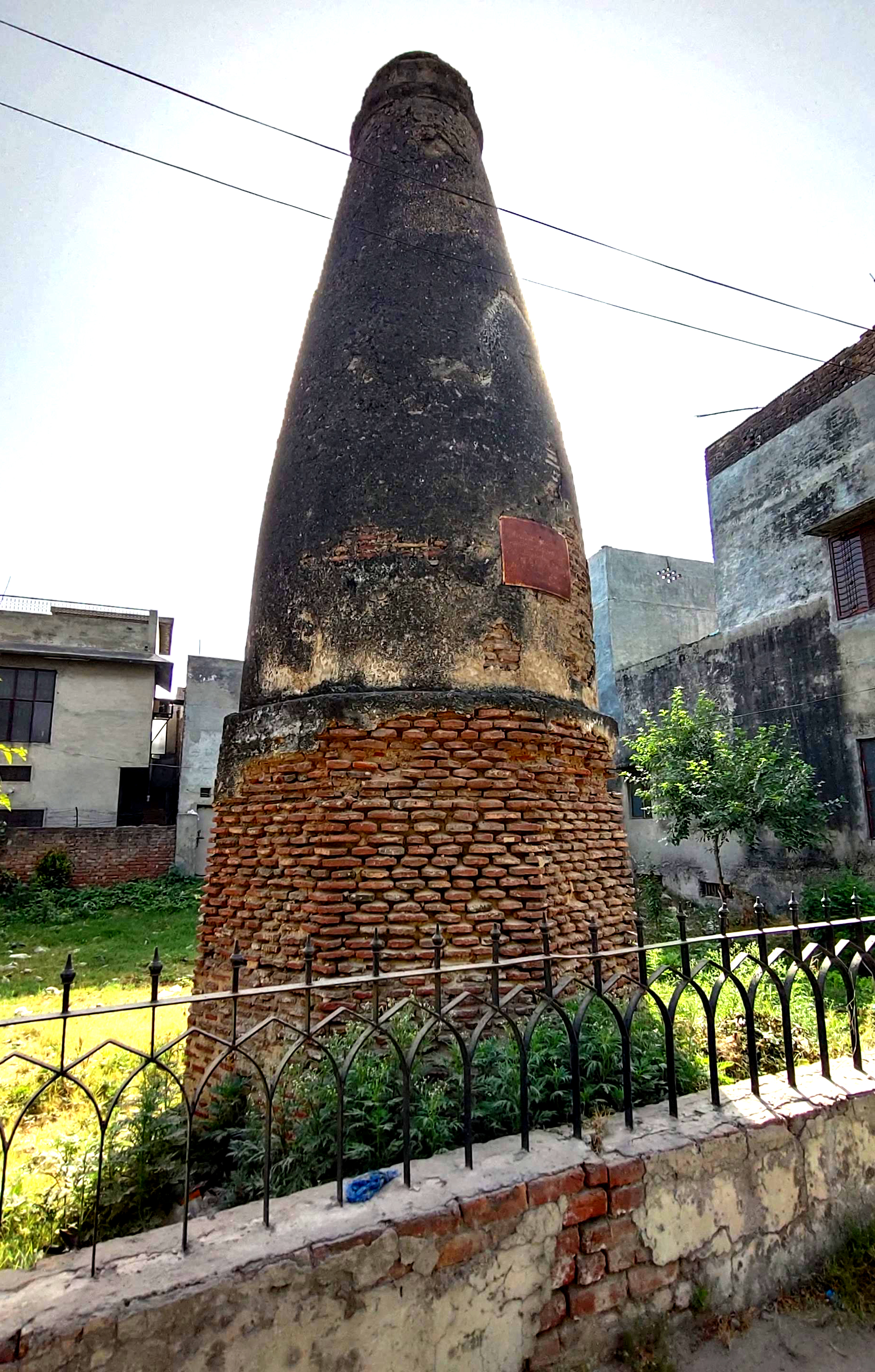
Mughalpura, Lahore, Pakistan

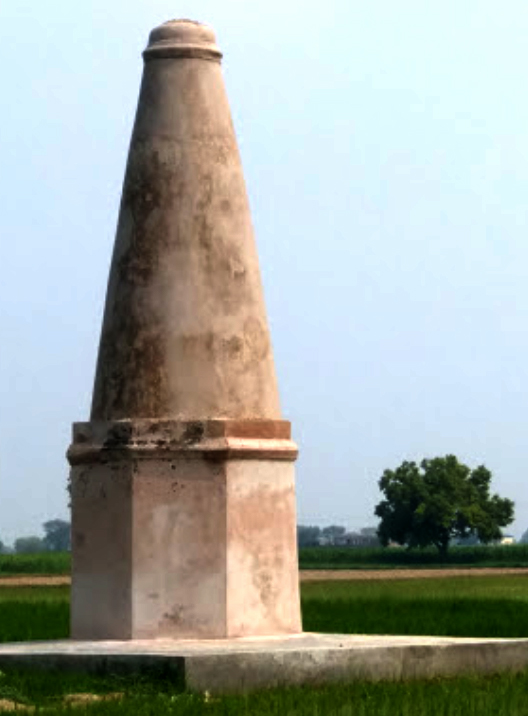
Manhala, Lahore, Pakistan

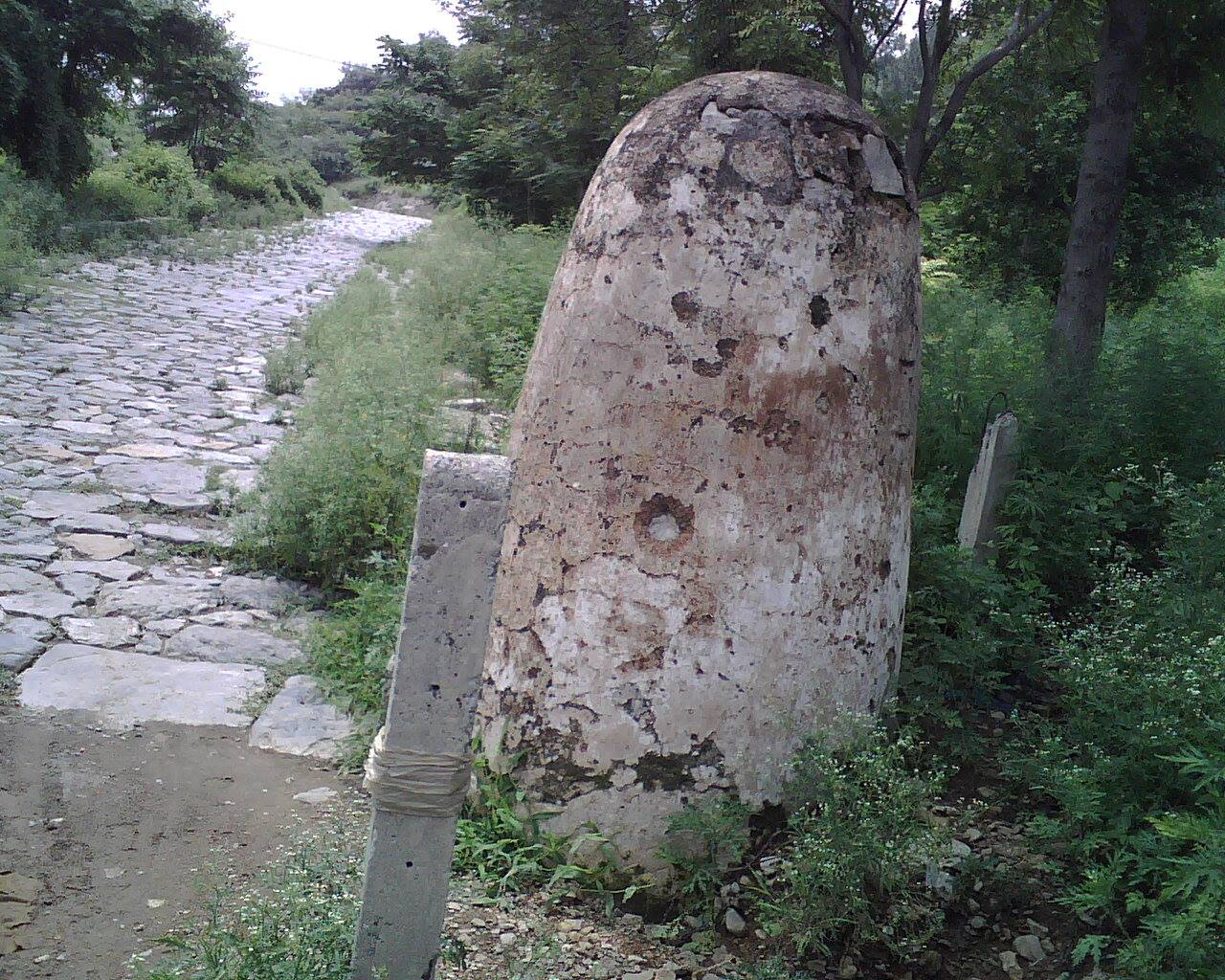
Taxla, Pakistan (old Grand Trunk Road)

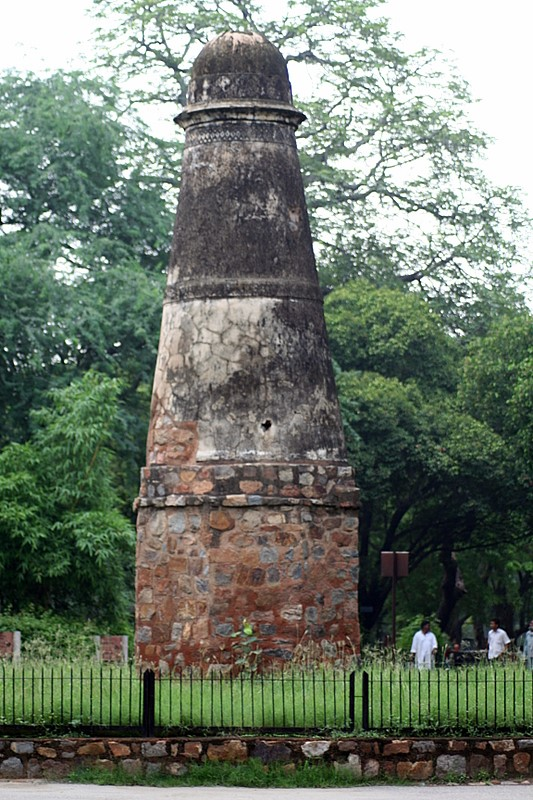
Delhi Zoo, India

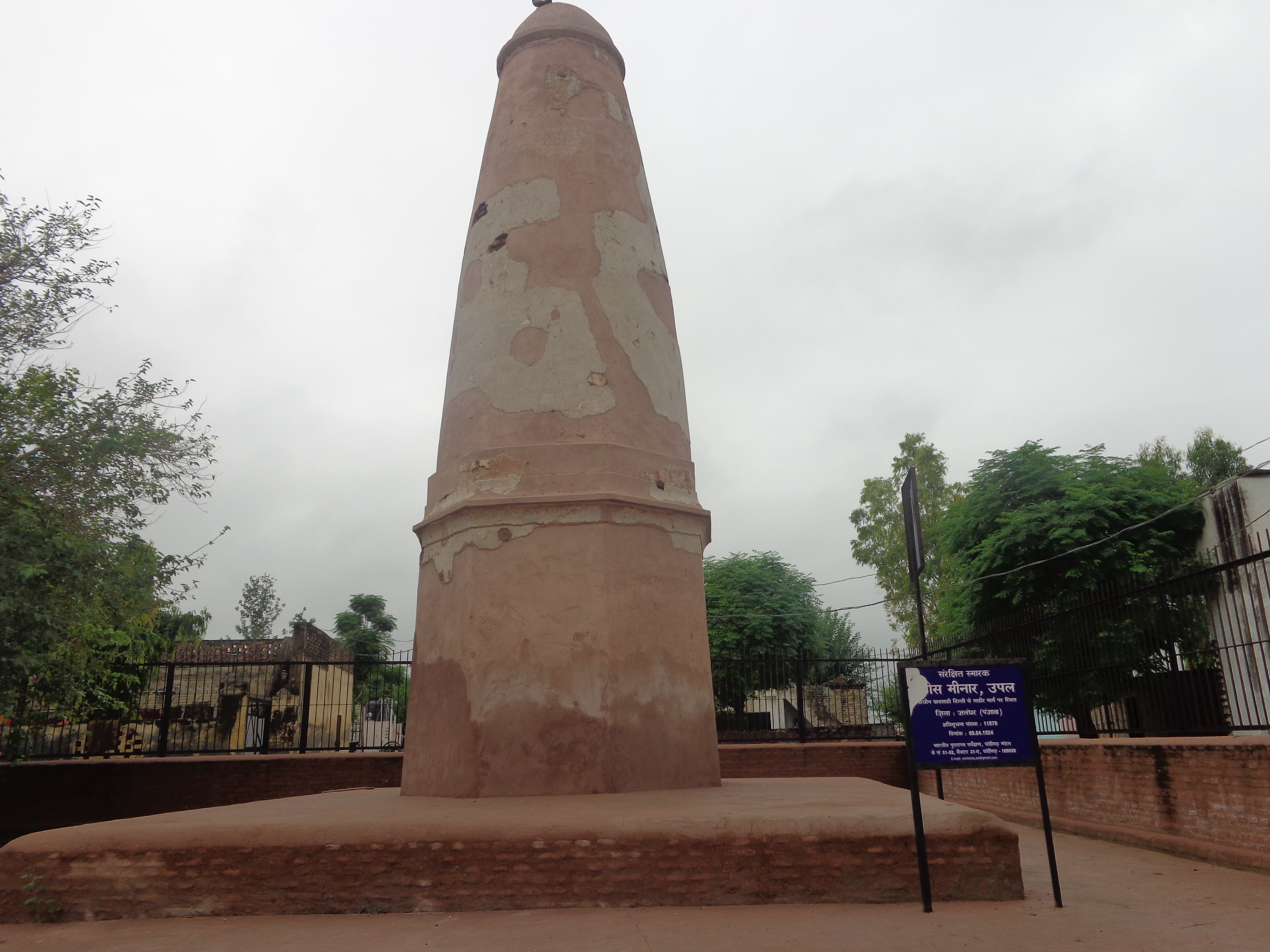
Jalandhar, India

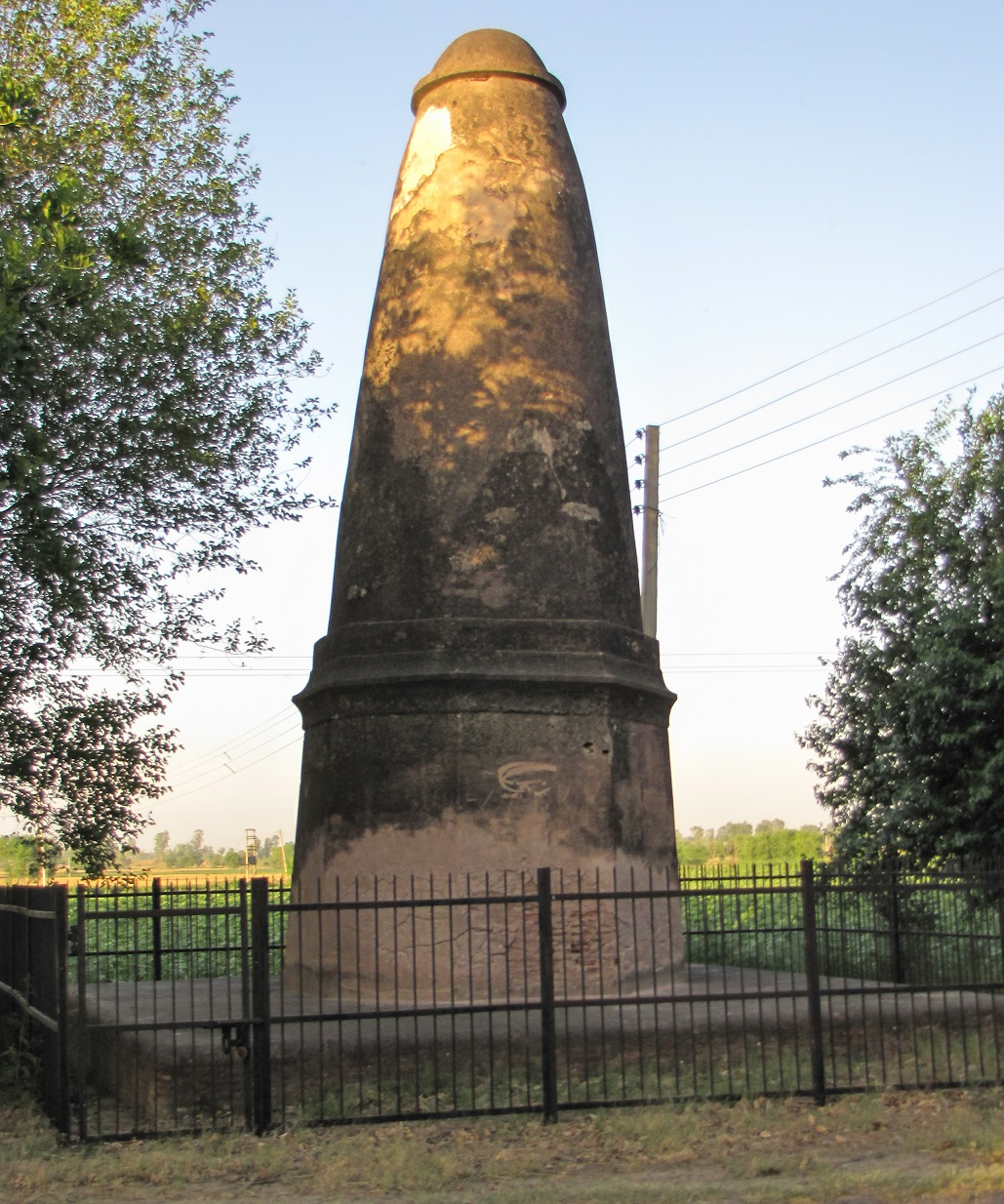
Dakkhni, Jalandhur, India

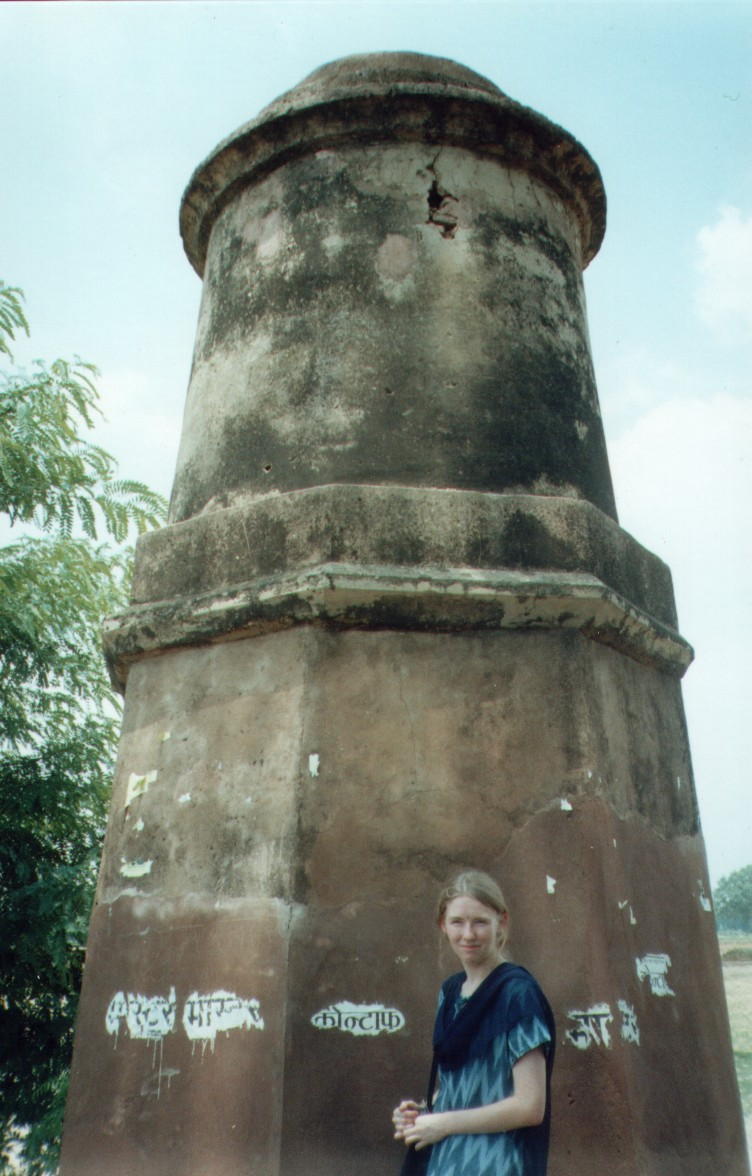
Uttar Pradesh, India

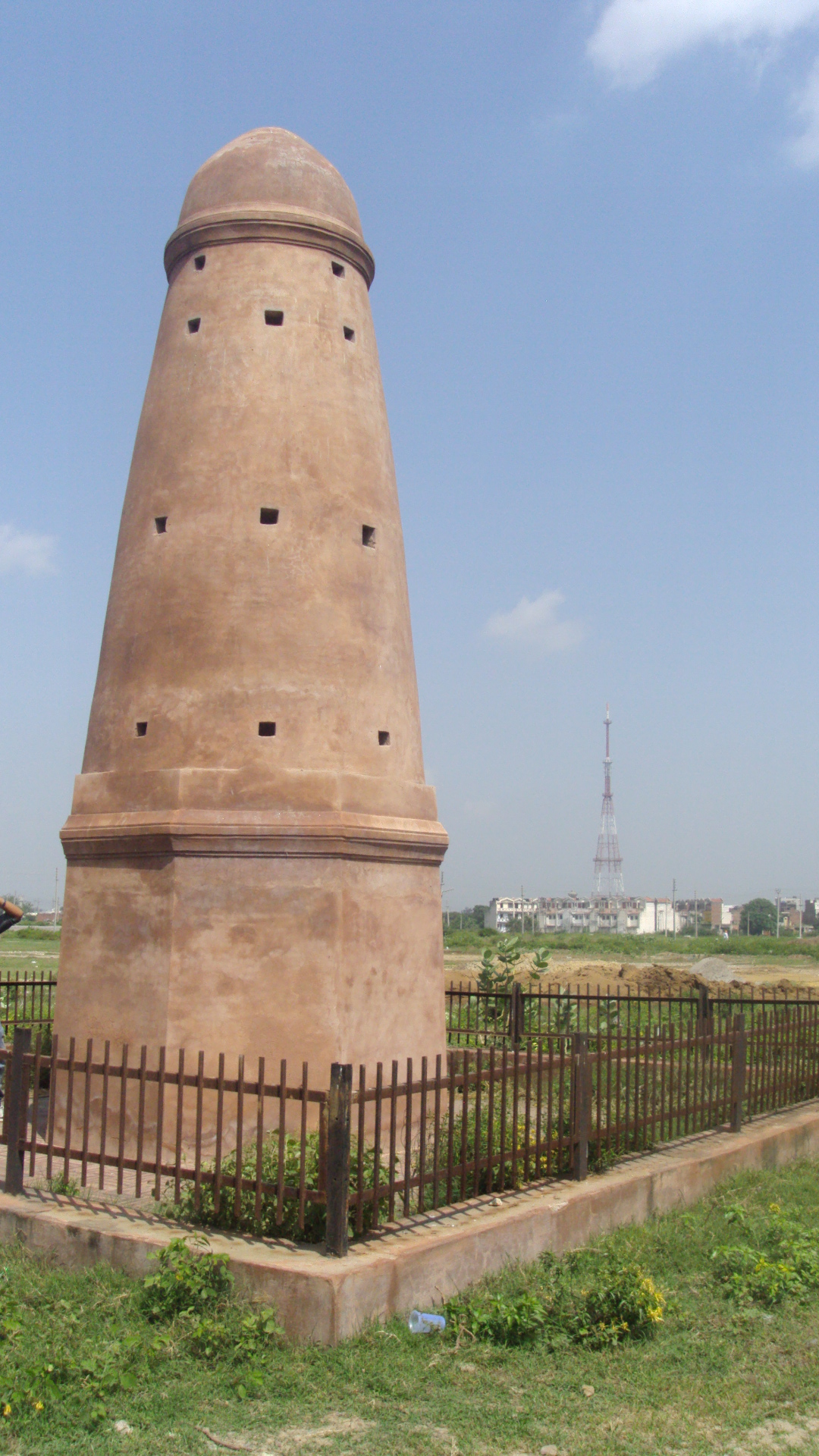
Tarawri, Karnal, India

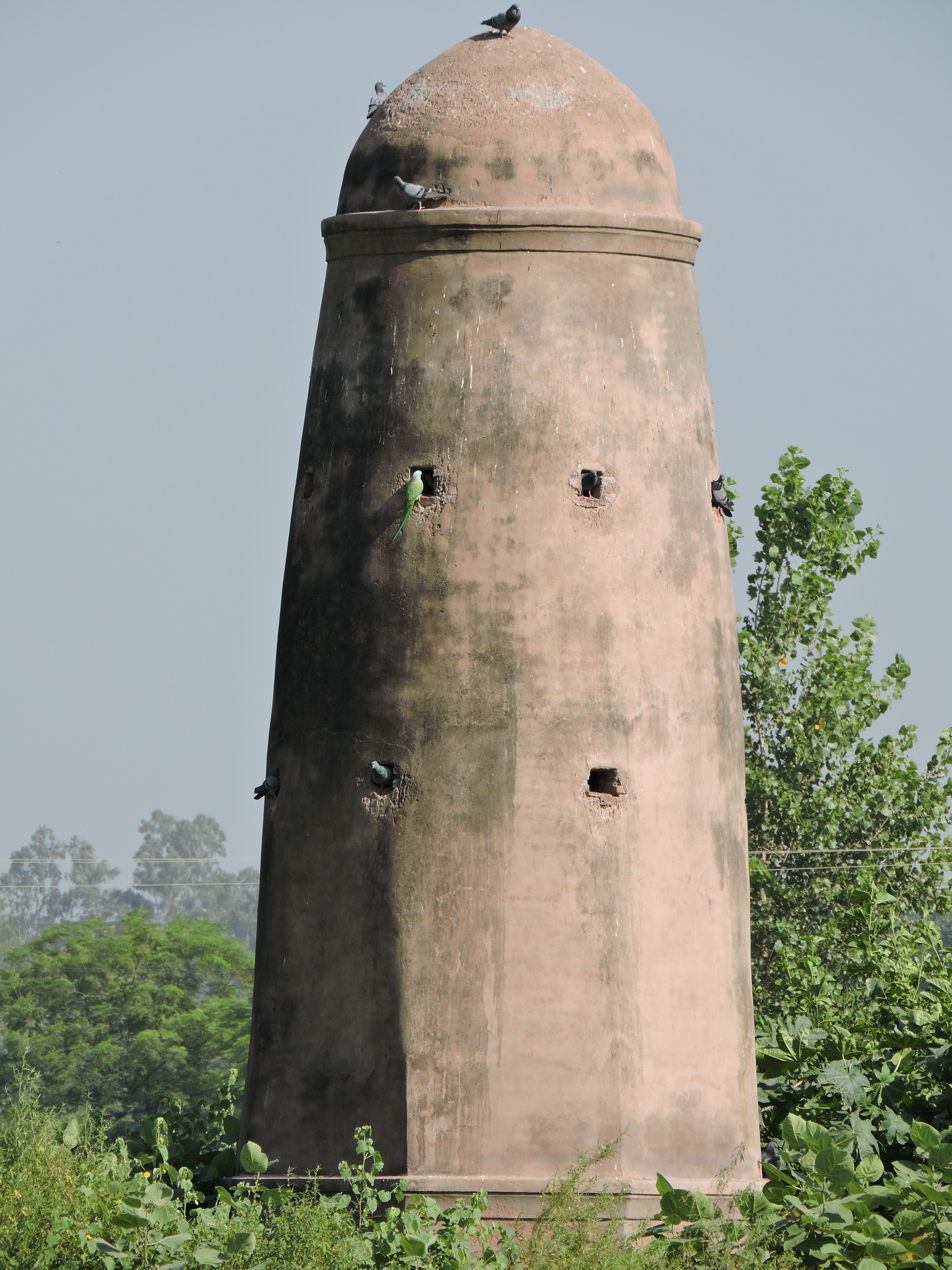
Karnal, India

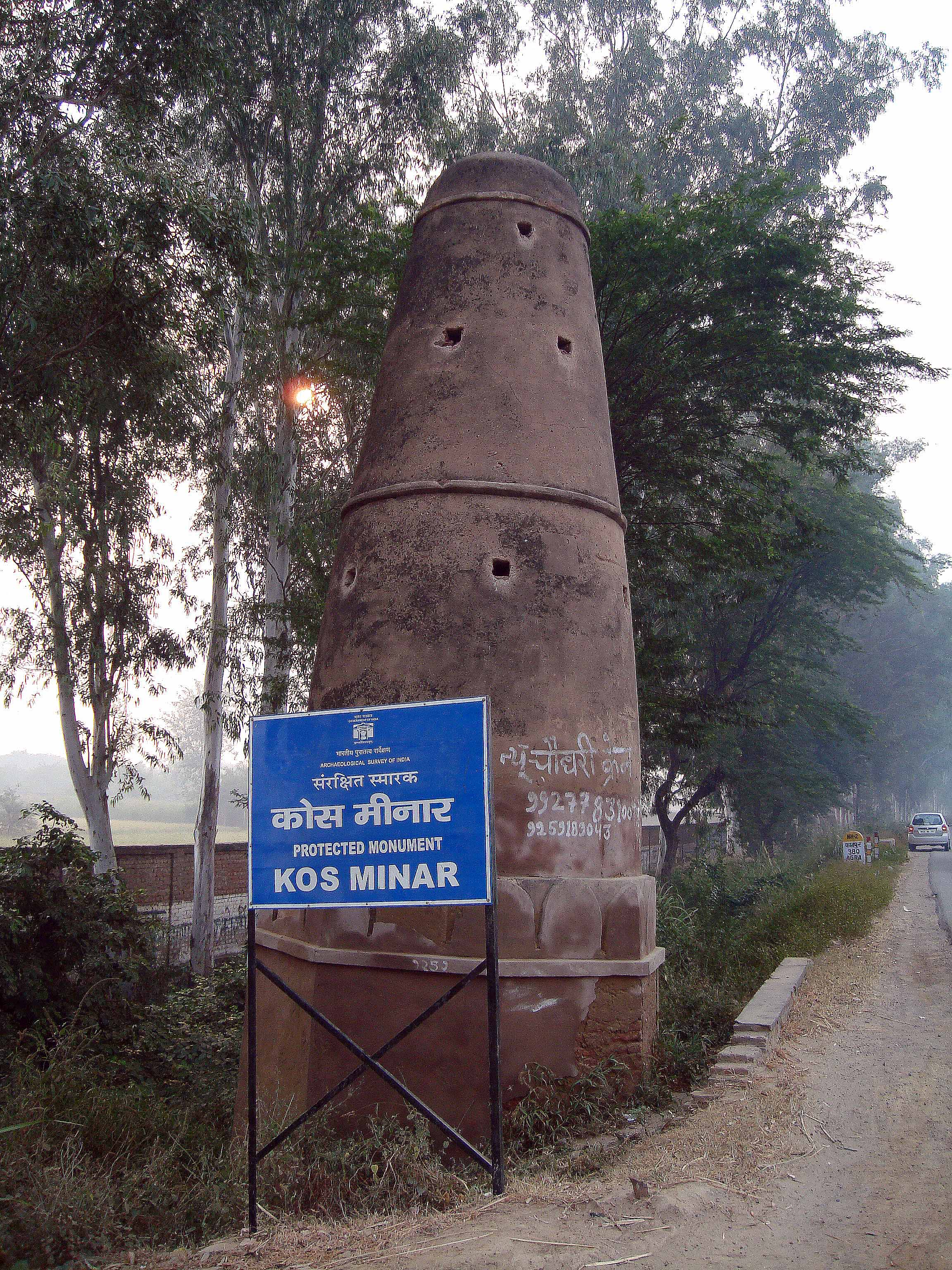
Haryana, India

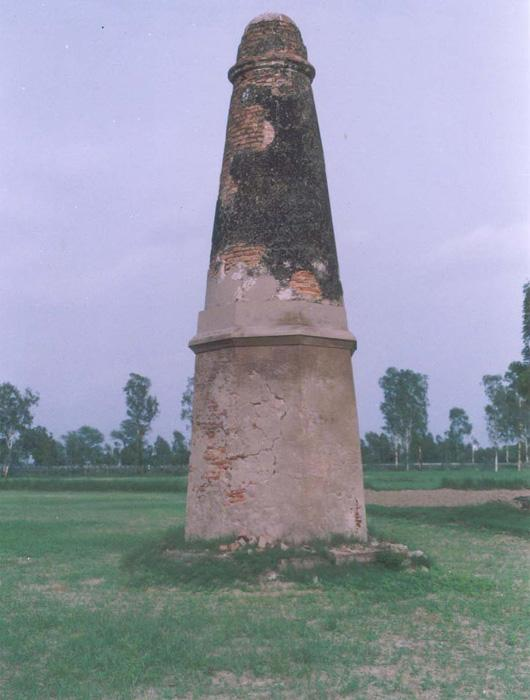
Ambala, Haryana, India

== See also ==
- List of Monuments of National Importance in Haryana, contains over a dozen Kos Minars in Haryana
