= Sohail Shaukat Butt =

Pakistani politician

- سہیل شوکت بٹ

Member of the Provincial Assembly of the Punjab
- In office 24 October 2018 – 14 January 2023
- Constituency: PP-164 Lahore-XXI

Member of the National Assembly of Pakistan
- In office 1 June 2013 – 31 May 2018
- Constituency: NA-130 (Lahore)

Personal details
- Born: 1 April 1983 (age 43)
- Party: PMLN (2008-present)

Sohail Shaukat Butt (Urdu: سہیل شوکت بٹ; born 1 April 1983) is a Pakistani politician who had been a member of the Provincial Assembly of the Punjab from October 2018 till January 2023. He was also a member of the National Assembly of Pakistan, from June 2013 to May 2018.

== Early life ==
He was born on 1 April 1983.

== Political career ==
Butt ran for the seat of the Provincial Assembly of Punjab as a candidate of Pakistan Muslim League (N) (PML-N) from Constituency PP-158 (Lahore-XXII) in the 2008 Pakistani general election, but was unsuccessful. He received 21,696 votes and lost the seat to Malik Ghulam Habib Awan.

He was elected to the National Assembly of Pakistan as a candidate of PML-N from Constituency NA-130 (Lahore-XIII) in the 2013 Pakistani general election from the big rural constituency of Lahore. He defeated Ch Ijaz Dayaal and Samina Khalid Ghurki with big margin. He received 88,842 votes and defeated Samina Khalid Ghurki. In the same election, he ran for the seat of the Provincial Assembly of Punjab as an independent candidate from Constituency PP-158 (Lahore-XXII), but was unsuccessful. He received 102 votes and lost the seat to Malik Ghulam Habib Awan.

In 2013, it was reported that Butt was granted bail in three murder cases.

In 2017, Butt was found guilty of his involvement in the murder of a politician affiliated with Pakistan Peoples Party.

He was re-elected to the Provincial Assembly of the Punjab as a candidate of PML-N from Constituency PP-164 (Lahore-XXI) in by-election held on 14 October 2018.
