= History of measurement systems in India =

The history of measurement systems in India begins in early Indus Valley Civilisation with the earliest surviving samples dated to the 3rd millennium BCE. Since early times the adoption of standard weights and measures has reflected in the country's architectural, folk, and metallurgical artifacts. A complex system of weights and measures was adopted by the Maurya Empire (322–185 BCE), which also formulated regulations for the usage of this system. Later, the Mughal Empire (1526–1857) used standard measures to determine land holdings and collect land tax as a part of Mughal land reforms. The formal metrication in India is dated to 1 October 1958 when the Indian Government adopted the International System of Units (SI).

== Early history ==
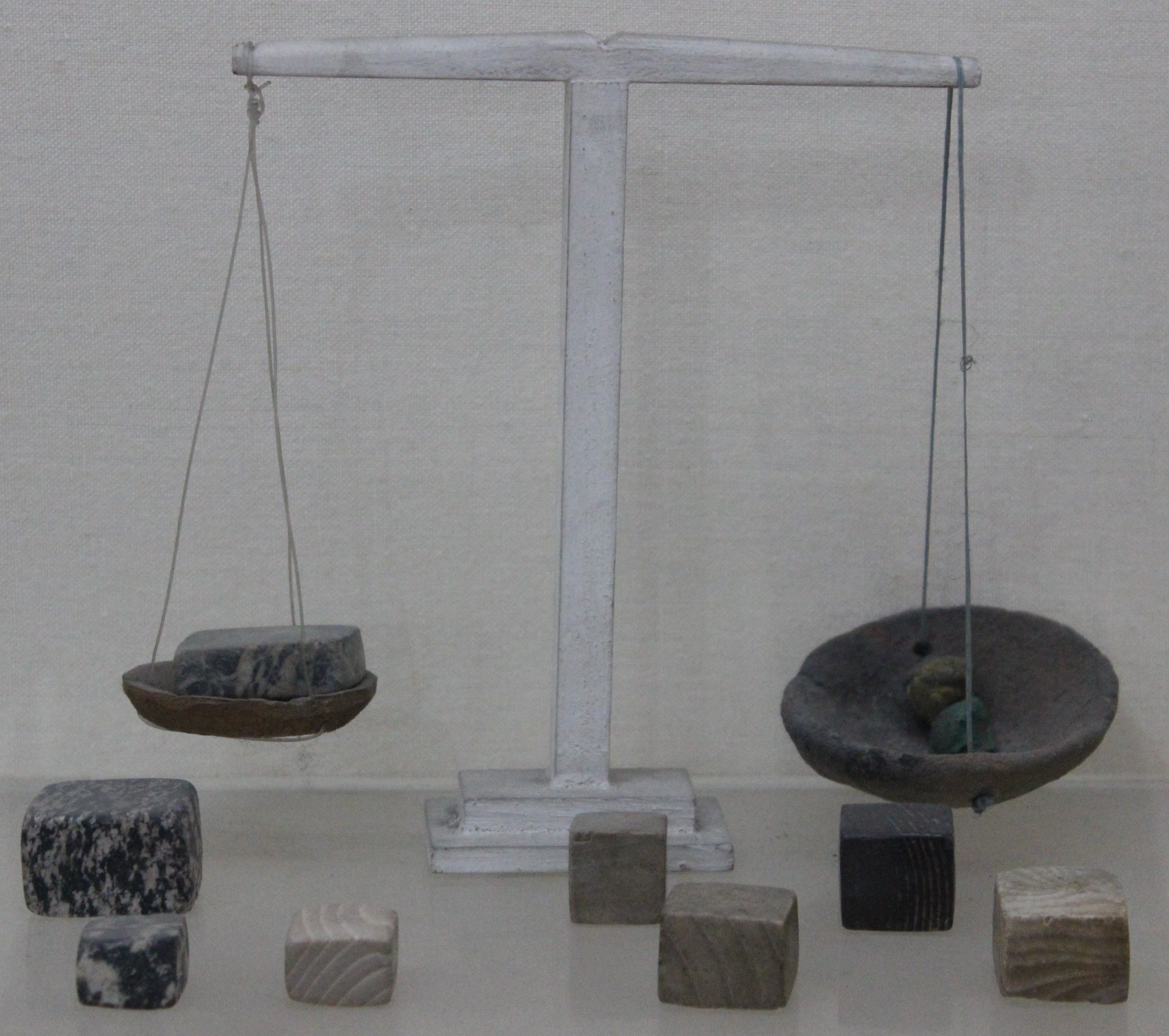
Indus Valley Civilization weights and measures – National Museum, New Delhi.

Hindu units almost similar to today's SI units and ritual importance—displayed on a logarithmic scale.

Standard weights and measures were developed by the Indus Valley Civilisation. The centralised weight and measure system served the commercial interest of Indus merchants as smaller weight measures were used to measure luxury goods while larger weights were employed for buying bulkier items, such as food grains etc. Weights existed in multiples of a standard weight and in categories. Technical standardisation enabled gauging devices to be effectively used in angular measurement and measurement for construction. Uniform units of length were used in the planning of towns such as Lothal, Surkotada, Kalibangan, Dolavira, Harappa, and Mohenjo-daro. The weights and measures of the Indus civilisation also reached Persia and Central Asia, where they were further modified. Shigeo Iwata describes the excavated weights unearthed from the Indus civilisation:

A total of 558 weights were excavated from Mohenjodaro, Harappa, and Chanhu-daro, not including defective weights. They did not find statistically significant differences between weights that were excavated from five different layers, each measuring about 1.5 m in depth. This was evidence that strong control existed for at least a 500-year period. The 13.7-g weight seems to be one of the units used in the Indus valley. The notation was based on the binary and decimal systems. 83% of the weights which were excavated from the above three cities were cubic, and 68% were made of chert.

The significance of a binary system of weights is that it allows an indivisible weight (eg. a gold coin or piece of jewelry) to be measured on a balance with the minimum number of weights, while the decimal system of weights and measures allows the minimum number of weights/measures to be used for bulk items by allowing repeat measures to be counted on the fingers.

Rulers made from Ivory were in use by the Indus Valley Civilisation prior to 1500 BCE. Excavations at Lothal (2400 BCE) have yielded one such ruler calibrated to about 1/16 inch (1.6 mm). Ian Whitelaw (2007)—on the subject of a ruler excavated from the Mohenjo-daro site—writes that: 'the Mohenjo-Daro ruler is divided into units corresponding to 1.32 inches (33.5 mm) and these are marked out in decimal subdivisions with amazing accuracy—to within 0.005 of an inch. Ancient bricks found throughout the region have dimensions that correspond to these units.' The Indus civilisation constructed pan balances made of copper, bronze, and ceramics. One excavated pan balance from Mohenjo-daro (2600–1900 BCE) was constructed using a cord-pivot type fulcrum, a bronze beam, and two pans. A number of excavated surveying instruments and measuring rods have yielded evidence of early cartographic activity.

Weights and measures are mentioned throughout the religious and secular works of the Vedic period in India. Some sources that mention various units of measurement are Satapatha Brahmana, Apastamba Sutra, and the Eight Chapters of the grammarian Pāṇini. Indian astronomers kept a pañchānga for calculations of tithi (lunar day), vāra (weekday), naksatra (asterism), and karan (half lunar day) for social and religious events. Klostermaier (2003) states that: "Indian astronomers calculated the duration of one kalpa (a cycle of the universe during which all the heavenly bodies return to their original positions) to be 4,320,000,000 years." According to epigraphic evidence, we have references of measurement units such as – “Kulyavapa”, “dronavapa”, “adhavapa” and “Pataka” from Bengal, nivratana” and “bhumi” from Central India and “nivartana from Western India.

== Post Mahajanapadas period—High Middle Ages (400 BCE–1200 CE) ==
Steelyard balances—found in India since the 4th century BCE—have been excavated from the archaeological sites of Gandhara and Amravati. Evidence of a complex system of weights and measures existing in use for multiple purposes under the central control of the Maurya administration (322–185 BCE) is found in the Arthashastra. Archaeologist Frank Raymond Allchin outlines the details of the measurement systems of the Maurya state:

The Arthashastra offers a wealth of evidence for the wide varieties of standardised weights and measures of the time. Officers were appointed to control their use and standardisation. The measurements include those of length, divided into several series, rising from those below the standard aṅgula, defined as the 'middle joint of the middle finger of a man of average size'; to those above, including the span and the cubit, and ending with the rod (danda) or bow (dhanus) of around 180 cm; and above this measurement of longer distance, the goruta or krosa and the yojana. Various special measurements are mentioned, for instance for digging moats, making roads or city walls. Measurements of capacity were set on different standards, for revenue, trade, payments, or palace purposes: these were applicable for both liquids and solids. Weights, too, were in several series: for precious substances there were three, for gold, silver, and diamonds; another series was for weights and general purposes. Weights should be made of iron or of stone from the Mekhala hills. Considerable attention is given to the types of weighing machines employed: one is a balance (tula) with two pans, for which ten different sizes are recommended for weighing different quantities; and another a sort of steelyard, in two sizes. A steelyard is used as a symbol on the negama coins from Taxila, suggesting their clear mercantile connotation. Equal attention is given to the measurement of time, based on the device named the nalika, being the time taken for one adhaka of water to flow out of a pot through a hole of the same diameter as that of a wire 4 angulas long, made from 4 masas of gold.

Depiction of equal arm balances is found in the art of Ajanta cave (No. 17) in the Maharashtra state. Beams of steelyard balances have been unearthed from the 8th century CE archaeological sites at Sirpur and Arang. The research conducted by Abū Rayḥān Muḥammad ibn Aḥmad al-Bīrūn, an Islamic scholar who undertook one of the first studies of India's traditions in his Tahriq-e-Hind, also reflect on the regular usage of the steelyard in India.

== Late Middle Ages—Republic of India (1200 CE–1947 CE onwards) ==
The Chinese merchant Ma Huan (1413–51) outlines the standardised weight and currency system in place at the port city of Cochin. Ma Huan noted that gold coins, known as fanam, or locally known as "panam", were issued in Cochin and weighed a total of one fen and one li according to the Chinese standards. They were of fine quality and could be exchanged in China for 15 silver coins of four-li weight each.

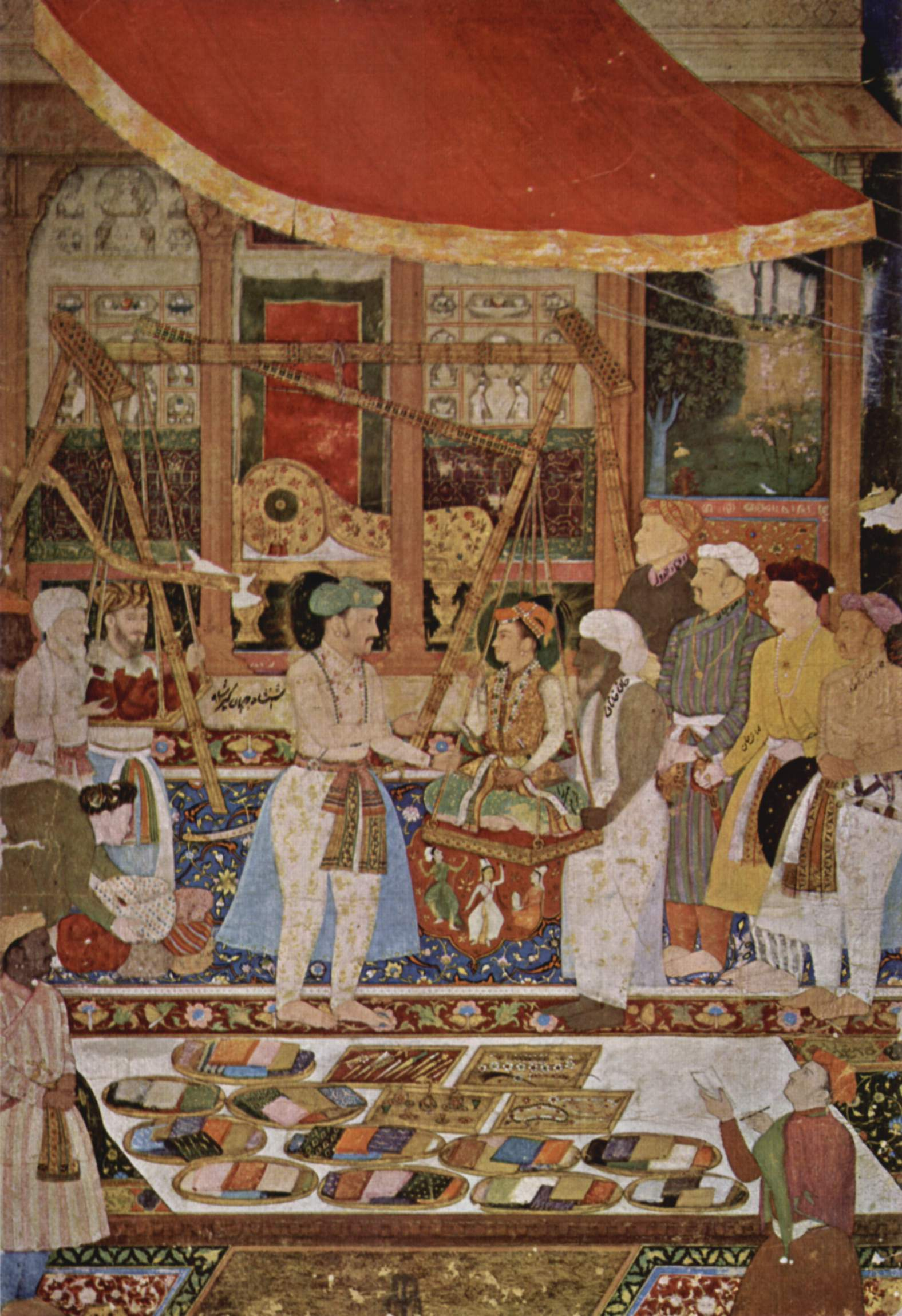
Emperor Jahangir (reign 1605–1627) weighing his son Shah Jahan on a weighing scale, 1615, Mughal dynasty.

The Mughal Empire (1526–1857) undertook central agrarian reforms, under which statistical data was compiled by the local quanungo officials on instructions from then revenue minister Todar Mal. As a part of these reforms, Akbar the Great (1556–1605) enforced practical standardisation in the empire's weight and measure system. The Mughal measurement system measured land in terms of gaz and bigha. The measure of agricultural output was the man. Todar Mal's reforms were resisted by large land holders in India, following which the land of these zamindars was placed under the control of the Mughal treasury. Mughal surveying parties used standardised bamboo rods with iron joints to clearly record land according to the standard imperial land measures. These records were later used to collect land revenue corresponding to the land holdings.

British units of measurement were adopted in India as first the East India Company and later colonial rule gained foothold. The Republic of India adopted the metric system on 1 October 1958. However, the traditional units still prevail in some areas. Chakrabarti (2007) holds that: 'Yet a few areas have still remained untouched by the metric system. In the land-measuring system in India, possibly one of the most complex and archaic systems, we follow different sets of measuring units and systems in different parts of the country. Different State governments have tried to standardise this by introducing a suitable metric system through which official transactions take place and official records are kept. But the land dealings are still done in a number of archaic units. It appears that people are satisfied and comfortable with them.'

Indians in villages continue to use some of the ancient measuring techniques and standards such as palm length, arm length or the owner, tula for gold and mana for weight etc.

== See also ==
- Indian units of measurement

== Bibliography ==
- Allchin, F.R. (1995), "The Mauryan State and Empire", The Archaeology of Early Historic South Asia: The Emergence of Cities and States, Cambridge University Press, ISBN 0-521-37695-5.
- Baber, Zaheer (1996), The Science of Empire: Scientific Knowledge, Civilization, and Colonial Rule in India, State University of New York Press, ISBN 0-7914-2919-9.
- Chakrabarti, Bhupati (2007), "Fifty years of the metric system in India and its adoption in our daily life", Current Science, 92 (3): 390–391, Indian Academy of Sciences.
- Chaudhuri, K. N. (1985), Trade and Civilisation in the Indian Ocean, Cambridge University Press, ISBN 0-521-28542-9.
- Iwata, Shigeo (2008), "Weights and Measures in the Indus Valley", Encyclopaedia of the History of Science, Technology, and Medicine in Non-Western Cultures (2nd edition) edited by Helaine Selin, pp. 2254–2255, Springer, ISBN 978-1-4020-4559-2.
- Kenoyer, Jonathan Mark (2006), "Indus Valley Civilization", Encyclopedia of India (vol. 2) edited by Stanley Wolpert, pp. 258–266, Thomson Gale, ISBN 0-684-31351-0
- Klostermaier, Klaus K. (2003), "Hinduism, History of Science and Religion", Encyclopedia of Science and Religion edited by J. Wentzel Vrede van Huyssteen, pp. 405–410, Macmillan Reference USA, ISBN 0-02-865704-7.
- Richards, John F. etc. (1996), The Mughal Empire, Cambridge University Press, ISBN 0-521-56603-7.
- Sarma, K.V. (2008), "Astronomy in India", Encyclopaedia of the History of Science, Technology, and Medicine in Non-Western Cultures (2nd edition) edited by Helaine Selin, pp. 317–321, Springer, ISBN 978-1-4020-4559-2.
- Schwartzberg, Joseph E. (2008), "Maps and Mapmaking in India", Encyclopaedia of the History of Science, Technology, and Medicine in Non-Western Cultures (2nd edition) edited by Helaine Selin, pp. 1301–1303, Springer, ISBN 978-1-4020-4559-2.
- Sharma, V.L. & Bhardwaj, H.C. (1989), "Weighing Devices in Ancient India", Indian Journal of History of Science 24 (4): 329–336, Indian National Science Academy.
- Whitelaw, Ian (2007), A Measure of All Things: The Story of Man and Measurement, Macmillan, ISBN 978-0-312-37026-8.
