= Malik Ghulam Habib Awan =

Pakistani politician

Member of the Provincial Assembly of the Punjab
- In office 15 August 2018 – 14 January 2023
- Constituency: PP-155 Lahore-XII
- In office 2008 – 31 May 2018
- Constituency: PP-158 (Lahore-XXI)

Personal details
- Born: 17 August 1965 (age 61) Manhala Road, Lahore Pakistan
- Party: PMLN (2008-present)

Malik Ghulam Habib Awan is a Pakistani politician frome Manhala, Lahore who was a Member of the Provincial Assembly of the Punjab, from 2008 to May 2018 and from August 2018 to January 2023.

== Early life and education ==
He was born on 17 August 1965 in a small village on Manhala Road, Lahore.

He graduated from University of the Punjab in 1986 and has the degree of Bachelor of Arts.

== Political career ==
He was elected to the Provincial Assembly of the Punjab as a candidate of Pakistan Peoples Party (PPP) from Constituency PP-158 (Lahore-XXII) in the 2008 Pakistani general election. He received 28,758 votes and defeated Sohail Shaukat Butt.

He was re-elected to the Provincial Assembly of the Punjab as a candidate of Pakistan Muslim League (N) (PML-N) from Constituency PP-158 (Lahore-XXII) in the 2013 Pakistani general election. He received 35,130 votes and defeated Naveed Ashiq Diyal, a candidate of PPP.

He was re-elected to Provincial Assembly of the Punjab as a candidate of PML-N from Constituency PP-155 (Lahore-XII) in the 2018 Pakistani general election.
