= Ghurki, Pakistan =

Village near Historic town Manhala, Lahore, Pakistan

Ghurki (Urdu: گھرکی ) is the name of a village of Arain tribe on the outskirts of Manhala, Lahore.

This family is named after the Ghurki Arain village who was known for being a gold trader of Lahore, prominent member being (Haji Muhammad Asghar Ghurki (late)) along with his brothers Yousaf Ghurki (late) and Younas Ghurki (late).

Haji Muhammad Asghar Ghurki was the founder of Ghurki Hospital. Muhammad Asghar Ghurki became MNA in 1985 in partyless general elections. Khalid Javed Ghurki (late) son of Haji Muhammad Asghar ghurki (late) was elected on the Pakistan People's Party's ticket in 1989. He was elected MNA in 1993 on the PPP ticket from Eastern Lahore and subsequently was made parliamentary secretary for railways. He also worked as Wahgah Town Nazim (mayor) from 2001 to 2005.

After developing medical complications a few years ago, Khalid Javed Ghurki died on 8 March 2011 due to renal failure. His wife, Samina Khalid Ghurki replaced him in the political arena and made it to the National Assembly of Pakistan in the 2008 general elections on PPP platform.

Samina Khalid Ghurki was re-elected in 2008 from the same constituency. She was appointed Federal Minister of Special Education in the cabinet of Prime Minister Yusuf Raza Gilani, Federal Minister of Environment and later Federal Minister of National Integration and Heritage in the cabinet of Prime Minister Raja Pervaiz Ashraf. Farooq Ghurki son of Yousaf Ghurki was a minister in the Shahbaz Sharif cabinet

Samina is the mother of two sons and two daughters. Ghurki family partially funds the Ghurki Trust Teaching Hospital in Lahore. Her late husband was a former Member of Parliament.

Other family members in politics include Farooq Ghurki (former Provincial Minister for Information and Technology), Arshad Ghurki, Muhammad Iqbal Ghurki (former Provincial Minister). She was among the 9 MPs to sign the United Nations Development Fund for Women's (UNIFEM) "say no to violence against women" campaign in New York. She was appointed as President of PPP Punjab Women Wing in 2018.

Ghurki village is located near the Manhala Town, Lahore

== See also ==
- Manhala
- Lahore
- Arain
