= Palya =

Indian time unit

A palya is a length of time used in Jainism to describe when the Lord Adinath ("First Lord") came to India, 100,000,000,000,000 palyas ago. A palya is defined as the time it takes to build a cube of lambswool 1 (or possibly 100) yojans high (between 4 and 9 miles or 6.4 km and 14.5 km), if one strand was laid down every century.

A palya is the length of time it would take to empty a well a mile square stuffed full of fine hairs, if one hair were removed every century.

The concept of Palya was born of the desire to quantify relative dimensions in time and space in proportion to the achievement of Nirvana or some similar enlightened state.

== See also ==
- Rajju
- Religious cosmology
- Hindu cosmology
- Jain cosmology
