= Constituency NA-130 =

Former constituency of the National Assembly of Pakistan

Constituency NA-130 (Lahore-XIII)
- Former constituency for the National Assembly of Pakistan
- Region: Lahore District

Former constituency
- Created: 1990
- Abolished: 2018

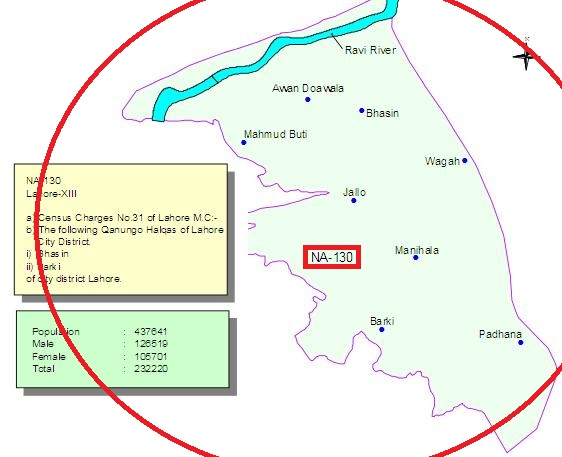
NA-130-Lahore-Constituency-Map

Constituency NA-130 (Lahore-XIII) (Urdu: این اے-۳۰۱، لاهور-۱۳) was a constituency for the National Assembly of Pakistan. After the 2018 delimitations, its areas were divided among NA-128 (Lahore-VI) and NA-132 (Lahore-X).

== Election 1990 ==
The elections were won by Ch. Ashiq Diyal by gaining 46,842 votes in 1990 by the IJI party.

== Election 1997 ==
Again in 1997 election's Ch. Ashiq Diyal won the elections by gaining 28,589 votes and became the member of national assembly of Pakistan.

== Election 2002 ==
General elections were held on 10 October 2002. Samina Khalid Ghurki of PPP won by 46,095 votes.

General election 2002: NA-130 Lahore-XIII
Party	Candidate	Votes	%	±%
PPP	Samina Khalid Ghurki	46,095	54.82	
PML(Q)	Ijaz Ahmad Dayel	33,491	39.83	
MMA	Waqar Nadeem Waraich	3,146	3.74	
PTI	Khadim Hussain Bhatti	1,346	1.61	
Turnout		86,186	37.09	
Total valid votes		84,078	97.55	
Rejected ballots		2,108	2.45	
Majority		12,604	14.99	
Registered electors		232,372		

== Election 2008 ==
General elections were held on 18 February 2008. Samina Khalid Ghurki of PPP won by 44,692 votes.

General election 2008: NA-130 Lahore-XIII
Party	Candidate	Votes	%	±%
PPP	Samina Khalid Ghurki	44,692	45.21	
PML(N)	Sadia Shabir	41,041	41.52	
PML(Q)	Ch. Muhammad Ashiq Dyial	12,613	12.76	
Others	Others (four candidates)	505	0.51	
Turnout		98,851	43.63	
Total valid votes		98,851	100	
Rejected ballots		0	0	
Majority		3,651	3.69	
Registered electors		226,575		

== Election 2013 ==
General elections were held on 11 May 2013. Sohail Shoukat Butt of PML-N won by 88,842 votes and became the member of National Assembly

General election 2013: NA-130 Lahore-XIII
Party	Candidate	Votes	%	±%
PML(N)	Sohail Shoukat Butt	88,842	56.45	
PPP	Samina Khalid Ghurki	32,569	20.69	
PTI	Talib Hussain Sidhu	22,066	14.02	
JI	Ch. Manzoor Hussain	8,780	5.58	
Independent	Malik Muhammad Ahmad Akmel Dogar	3,264	2.07	
Others	Others (eighteen candidates)	1,870	1.19	
Turnout		161,351	55.46	
Total valid votes		157,391	97.55	
Rejected ballots		3,960	2.45	
Majority		56,273	35.76	
Registered electors		290,930		
