= Encyclopedia of India =

Four-volume encyclopedia on history and culture of India

The Encyclopedia of India is a four-volume encyclopedia on Indian history and culture under editor-in-chief Stanley Wolpert. The series was published by Gale (Cengage) in November 2005 under ISBN 978-0-684-31349-8.

The Library Journal has described Wolpert's work as "outstanding"
