= Samina Khalid Ghurki =

Pakistani politician

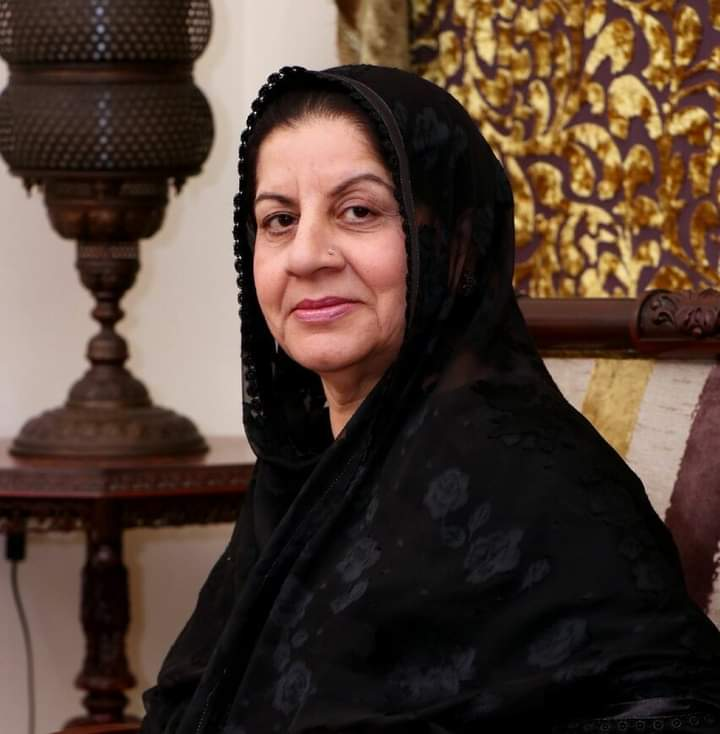

Member of the National Assembly of Pakistan
- Incumbent
- Assumed office 22 September 2024 Co-leader with Ghurki Trust Teaching Hospital
- Constituency: Reserved seat for women
- In office 8 March 2024 – 14 May 2024
- Constituency: Reserved seat for women
- In office 17 March 2008 – 16 March 2013
- Constituency: NA-130 (Lahore-XIII)
- In office 16 November 2002 – 15 November 2007
- Constituency: NA-130 (Lahore-XIII)

Minister for National Heritage and Integration
- In office 26 October 2011 – 16 March 2013
- Prime Minister: Yusuf Raza Gillani; Raja Pervaiz Ashraf
- Preceded by: Newly established ministry
- Succeeded by: Position dissolved

Minister for Environment
- In office 11 February 2011 – 30 June 2011
- Prime Minister: Yusuf Raza Gillani
- Preceded by: Hameed Ullah Jan Afridi
- Succeeded by: Rana Farooq Saeed Khan

Minister for Social Welfare and Special Education
- In office 4 November 2008 – 11 February 2011
- Prime Minister: Yusuf Raza Gillani
- Preceded by: Ali Akbar Wains
- Succeeded by: Position dissolved

Personal details
- Born: 13 August 1956 (age 70) Lahore, Punjab, Pakistan
- Party: PPP (2002-present)
- Spouse: Khalid Javaid Ghurki
- Children: 4
- Education: Lahore College for Women University (BA)
- Website: Samina Khalid Ghurki

Samina Khalid Ghurki (Urdu: ثمینہ خالد گھرکی) is a Pakistani politician from Manhala, Lahore who served as the Federal Minister for Social Welfare and Special Education from November 2008 until February 2011. She subsequently held the position of Federal Minister for Environment from February 2011 to June 2011. Later, she was appointed the Federal Minister for National Heritage and Integration, serving from October 2011 to March 2013, excluding a brief period following the removal of Prime Minister Yusuf Raza Gilani in June 2012.

== Early life and education ==
Ghurki was born on 13 August 1956, in Lahore, Punjab. She obtained her B.A. degree from the Lahore College for Women University in 1976.

== Political career ==
Ghurki entered politics in 2002 when her husband and brothers-in-law were ineligible to run for office due to the lack of university degrees. She contested the 2002 Pakistani general election as a candidate of the Pakistan People's Party (PPP) from Constituency NA-130 (Lahore-XIII) and defeated Ijaz Ahmad Dayel, a candidate of Pakistan Muslim League (Q) (PML-Q). She received 46,095 votes, prevailing over Ijaz Ahmad Dayel, a candidate of Pakistan Muslim League (Q) (PML-Q), who secured 33,491 votes. She became the first woman to get elected from a general seat in Lahore. She was re-elected from the same constituency in the 2008 Pakistani general election and defeated Sadia Shabir, a candidate of Pakistan Muslim League (N) (PML-N). She received 44692 votes, and defeated Sadia Shabir, a candidate of Pakistan Muslim League (N) (PML-N) who secured 41,041 votes.

Ghurki held several ministerial roles during her tenure as a member of the National Assembly. On 4 November 2008, Yousuf Raza Gilani appointed her as the Federal Minister for Social Welfare and Special Education, a role she held until 11 February 2011. She then briefly served as the Federal Minister for Environment from 11 February to 30 June 2011 which included a portfolio of Women Development assigned to her on 5 March. She held both positions until 30 June 2011. After a period without a specific portfolio, she was appointed Federal Minister for National Heritage and Integration on 26 October 2011, serving until 19 June 2012, and again from 22 June 2012 to 16 March 2013 under the premiership of Raja Pervaiz Ashraf.

In 2012, Ghurki was among nine female Members of Parliament from Pakistan who endorsed the UNIFEM's "Say No to Violence Against Women" campaign in New York.

In the 2013 Pakistani general election, she contested for the seat of the National Assembly as a candidate of PPP from Constituency NA-130 (Lahore-XIII), but she was unsuccessful. She received 32,569 votes and lost the seat to Sohail Shaukat Butt, a candidate of PML-N, who secured 88,842 votes.

In July 2017, Ghurki was appointed as the president of the PPP Punjab Women Wing. Previously, she has served as a president of PPP Lahore.

In the 2024 Pakistani general election, she secured a seat in the National Assembly through a reserved quota for women as a candidate of PPP from Punjab. On 8 March, she was sworn in as a member of the National Assembly. On 13 May 2024, the Election Commission of Pakistan (ECP) suspended her membership as a member of the National Assembly. This action followed a Supreme Court of Pakistan decision to suspend the verdict of the Peshawar High Court, which had denied the allocation of a reserved seat to the PTI-Sunni Ittehad Council bloc. On 22 September 2024, she again became a member of the National Assembly by securing another reserved women's seat as a PPP candidate from Punjab.

== Personal life ==
Samina Khalid Ghurki was married to Khalid Javaid Ghurki until his death in 2011. Her husband also served as a member of the National Assembly. She is a mother of two sons, Adnan and Sufian, and two daughters.
