= Ratti (unit) =

Mass unit

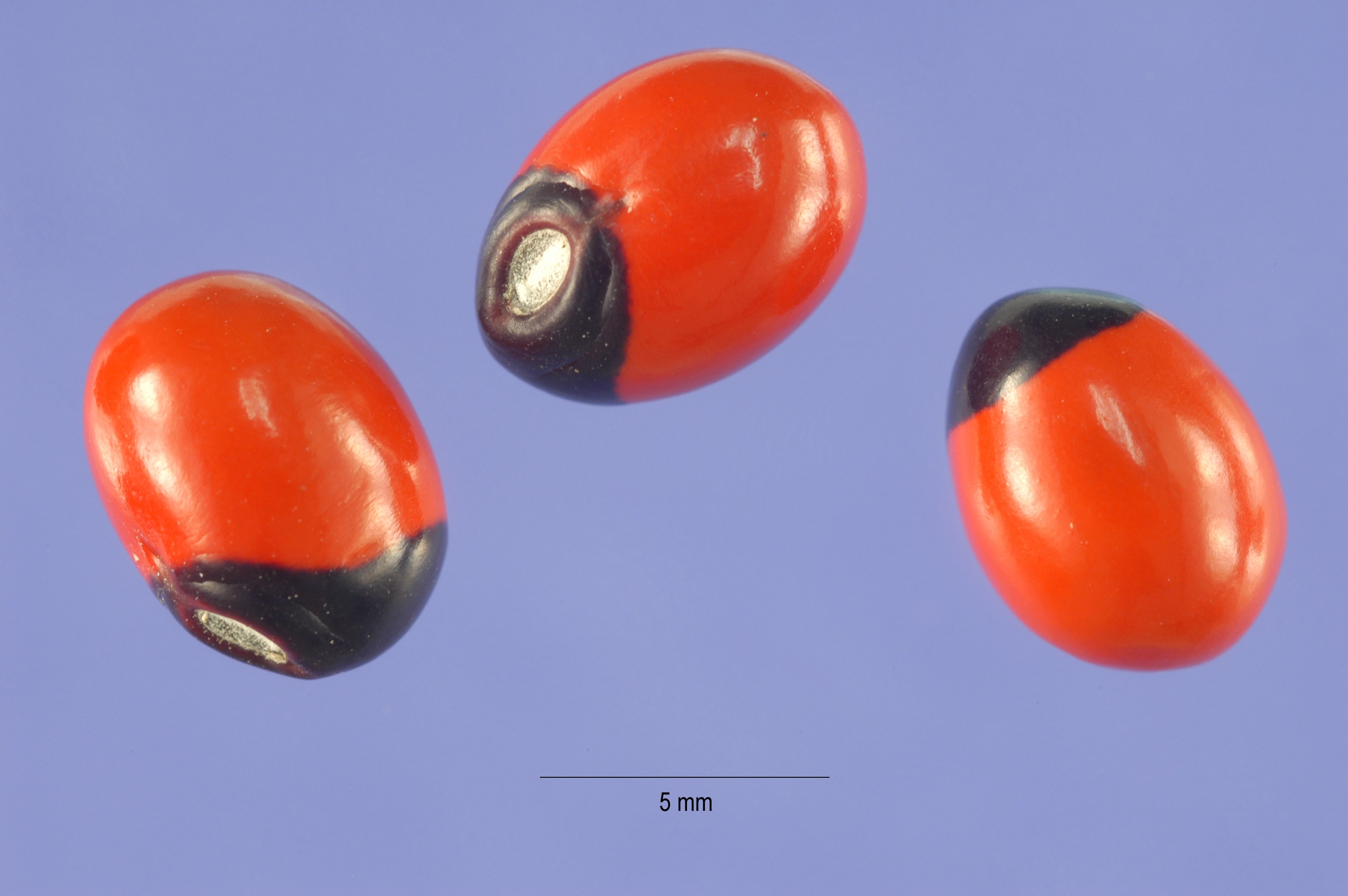
- Gunja seeds (Abrus precatorius), used for measuring weights in India.

General information
- Unit system: Indian
- Unit of: mass

Conversions
1 in ...	... is equal to ...
- SI units: 0.11339 g

Ratti (Sanskrit: raktika) is a traditional Indian unit of measurement for mass. Based on the nominal weight of a Gunja seed (Abrus precatorius), it measured approximately 1.8 or 1.75 grains or 0.1215 g as standardized weight. It is still used by jewellers in the Indian Subcontinent.

== History ==
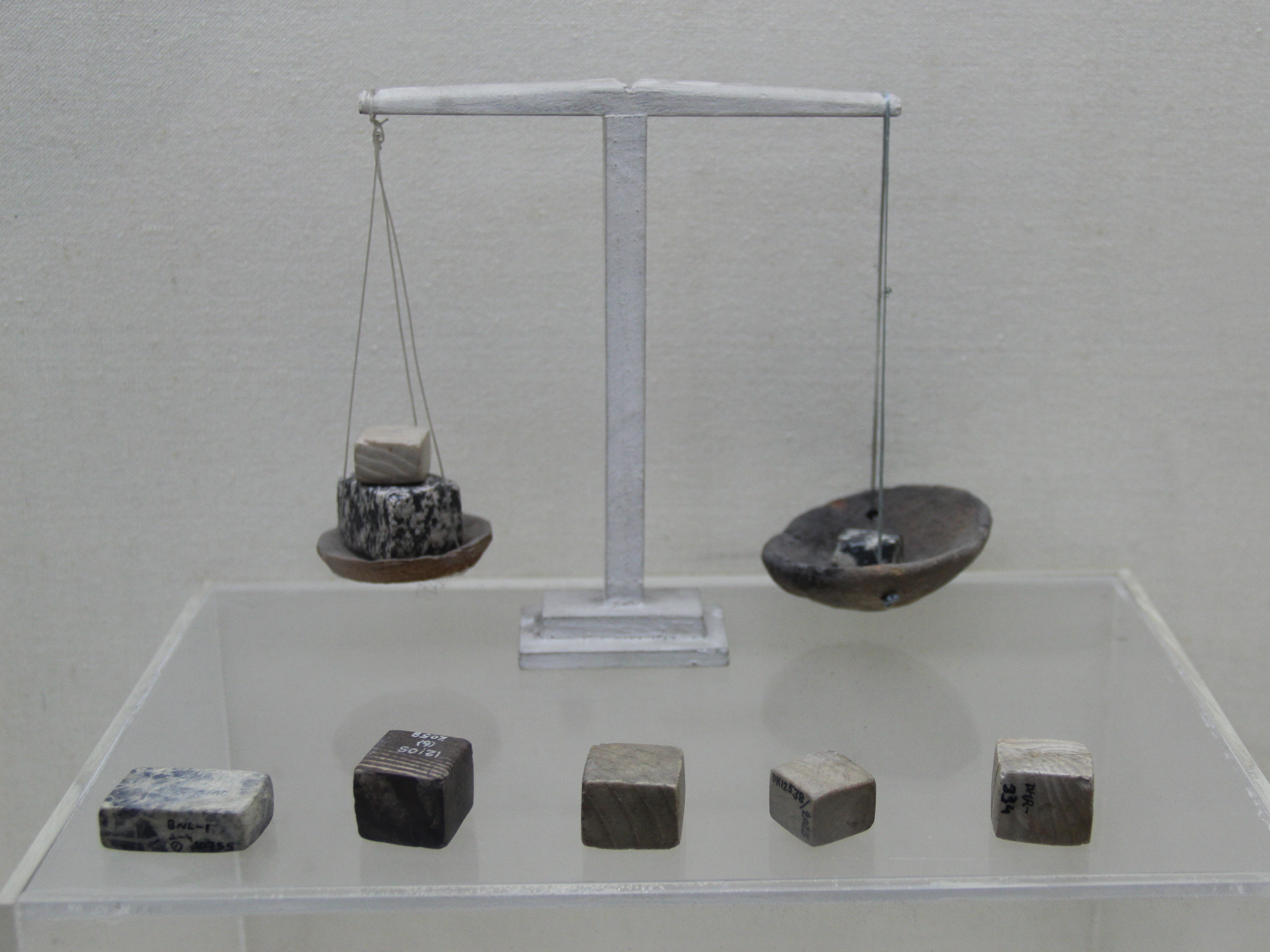
Indus weights were based on binary multiples of Masha, which was equal to 8 Ratti

Ratti weights of Ancient Indian coins

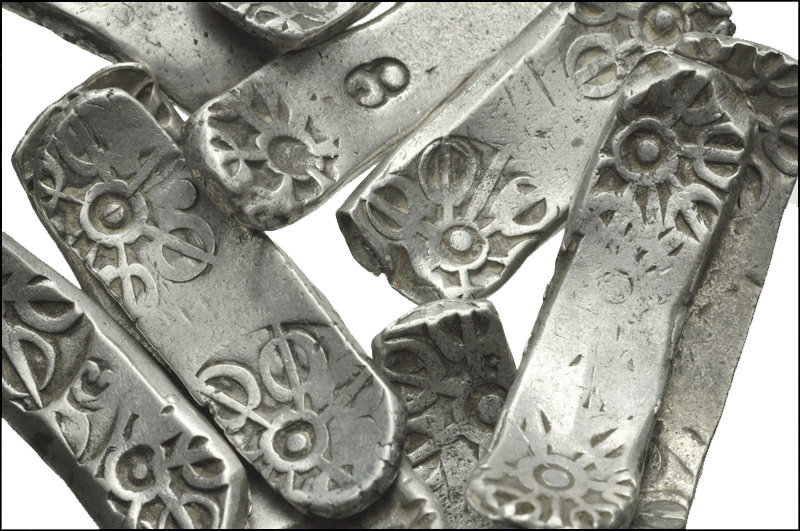
Gandharan Satamana of 100 Rattis (11–12 g)

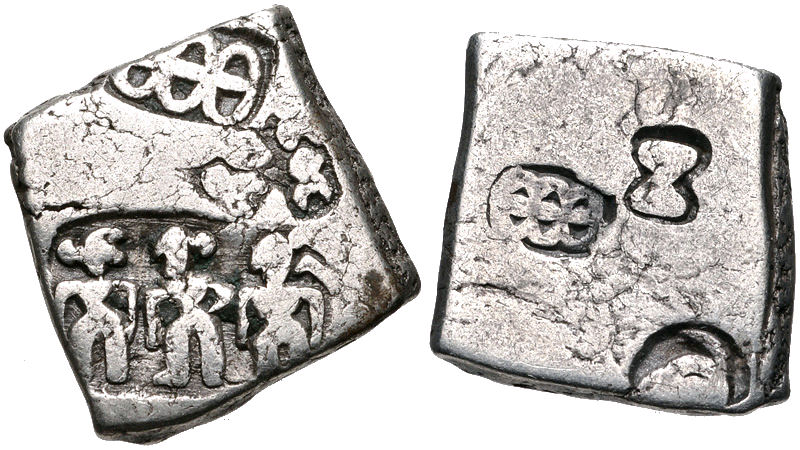
Mauryan Karshapana of 32 Rattis (3.5 g)

Ratti-based measurement is the oldest measurement system in the Indian subcontinent, highly favoured for its uniformity of weight. The smallest weight in the Indus Valley Civilization, historically called the masha, was equal to 8 rattis. The Indus weights were the multiples of masha and the 16th factor was the most common weight of 128 ratti or 13.7 g.

A unit called Śatamāna, literally a "hundred standard" or "hundred measures", representing 100 krishnalas is mentioned in Satapatha Brahmana. A later commentary on Katyayana Srautasutra explains that a Śatamāna could also be 100 rattis. A Satamana was used as a standard weight of silver coins of Gandhara between 600–200 BCE. Ratti is also known for its attractive colour. Other Indian currency weights like Karshapanas were also based on the weight of ratti. Gold coins excavated from southeast Asia have been analysed as following the ratti based weight system as well.

During the period of Kautilya, the 32 ratti standard was called as Purana or Dharana which was in vogue before the Maurya Empire, but Kautilya provides a new standard of 80 ratti called Svarna, which was widely adopted from that time onwards. The ball weights from jeweller's hoard discovered from Taxila conform to the 32 ratti standard also called Purana by Kautilya, while the Mathura weights (Dated from 1st century BC-2nd century AD) with Brahmi numeral 100 (100 svarna or 100 karsha) conforms with the new svarna standard.

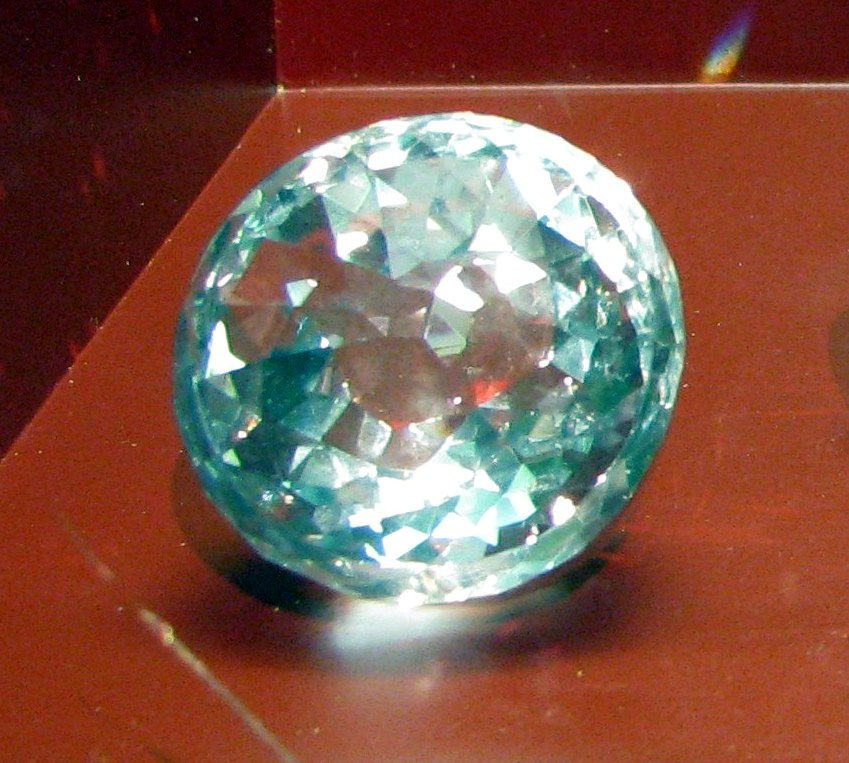
''The Great Mogul Diamond'' described by Tavernier weighed 319.5 Ratti

The Mughal empire employed Ratti as a unit of measure for the weight of precious stones such as diamonds. Around 1665 the Shah's son, Aurangzeb, showed a diamond to the famous jeweler and world traveler Jean Baptiste Tavernier. At that time Tavernier wrote in his Six Voyages:

"The first piece that Akel Khan (Chief Keeper of the King's jewels) placed in my hands was the great diamond, which is rose cut, round and very high on one side. On the lower edge there is a slight crack, and a little flaw in it. Its water is fine, and weighs 319 1/2 Ratis, which makes 280 of our carats, the Rati being 7/8th of a carat."

== Unit conversion ==
The following info provides the unit conversion from ratti to other units in traditional Indian system of measurements.

=== Jeweller's conversion ===
- 1 Tola = 12 Masha or 11.664 g
- 1 Masha = 8 Ratti or 0.972 g

1 Tola = 12 Masha = 96 Ratti = 11.664 grams.

Hence

- 1 Ratti (sunari) goldsmith = 121.5 mg
- 1 Pakki Ratti (for astrological gemstones) = 1.5 x Sunari Ratti = 1.5 x 121.5 mg = 182.25 mg.

== See also ==
- Rasa shastra (Ayurveda)

== Bibliography ==
- Cunningham, Alexander (1891), Coins of Ancient India: From the Earliest Times Down to the Seventh Century A. D., London: B. Quaritch
- Mukherjee, B. N. (2012), "Money and Social Changes in India (up to c. AD 1200)", in Saiyid Zaheer Husain Jafri (ed.), Recording the Progress of Indian History: Symposia Papers of the Indian History Congress, 1992-2010, Primus Books, pp. 411–, ISBN 978-93-80607-28-3
