= Tola (unit) =

Traditional Asian unit of mass

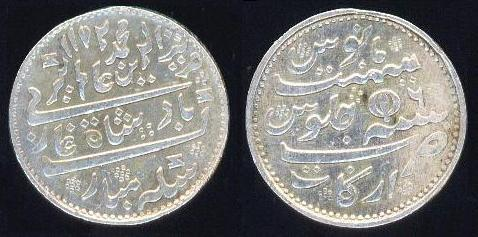
Silver rupee coins, issued by the British East India Company, were a practical standard for the tola.

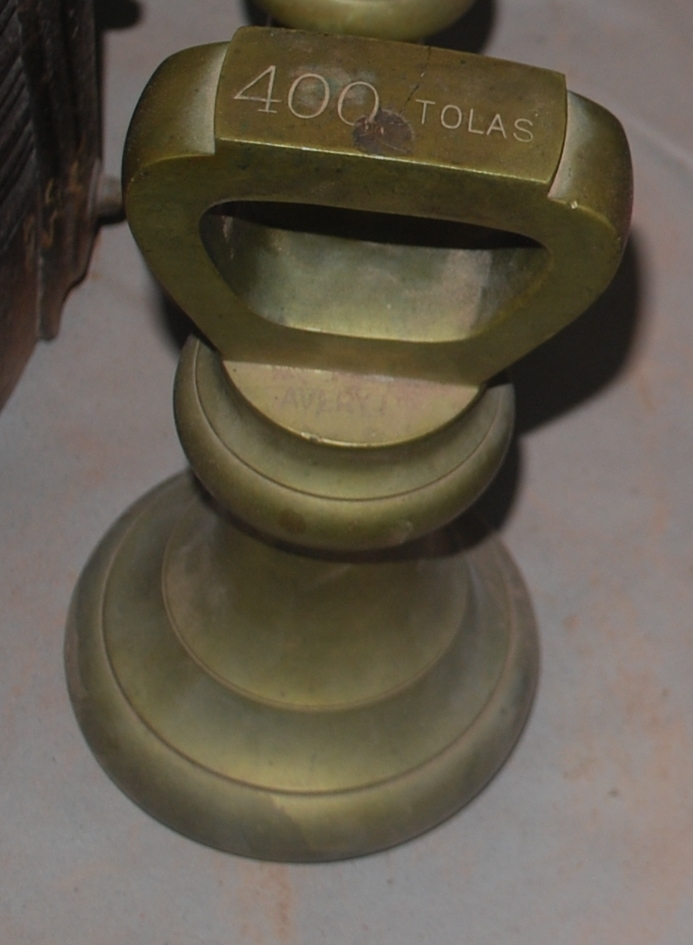
400 tolas

The tola (Hindi: तोला / Urdu: تولا, romanized: tolā; also transliterated as tolah or tole) is a traditional South Asian unit of mass, now standardised as 180 grains (11.6638038 grams) or exactly 3/8 troy ounce. It was the base unit of mass in the British Indian system of weights and measures introduced in 1833, although it had been in use for much longer. It was also used in Aden and Zanzibar: in the latter, one tola was equivalent to 175.90 troy grains (0.97722222 British tolas, or 11.33980925 grams).

The tola is a Vedic measure, with the name derived from the Sanskrit तोलः tolaḥ (from the root तुल् tul) meaning "weighing" or "weight". One tola was traditionally the weight of 100 Ratti (ruttee) seeds, and its exact weight varied according to locality. However, it is also a convenient mass for a coin: several pre-colonial coins, including the currency of Akbar the Great (1556–1605), had a mass of "one tola" within slight variation. The first rupee (Urdu: رپيا; rupayā), minted by Sher Shah Suri (1540–45), had a mass of 178 troy grains, or about 1% less than the British tola. The British East India Company issued a silver rupee coin of 180 troy grains, and this became the practical standard mass for the tola well into the 20th century.

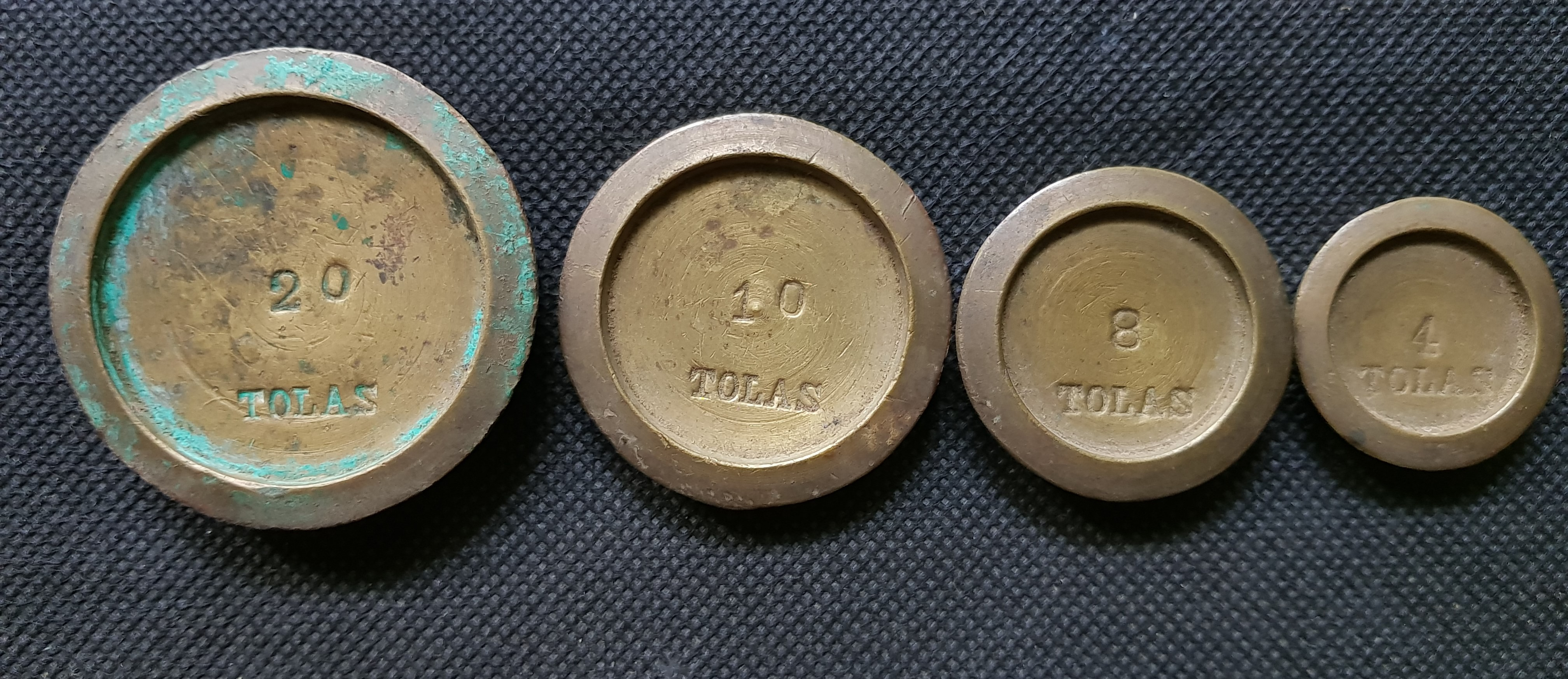
A set of tolas

The British tola of 180 troy grains (from 1833) can be seen as more of a standardisation than a redefinition: the previous standard in the Bengal Presidency, the system of "sicca weights", was the mass of one Murshidabad rupee, 179.666 troy grains. For the larger weights used in commerce (in the Bengal Presidency), the variation in the pre-1833 standards was found to be greater than the adjustment.

The tola formed the base for units of mass under the British Indian system, and was also the standard measure of gold and silver bullion. Although the tola has been officially replaced by metric units since 1956, it is still in current use, and is a popular denomination for gold bullion bars in Bangladesh, India, Nepal, Pakistan and Singapore, with a ten tola bar being the most commonly traded. In Nepal, minting of tola size gold coins continue up to the present, even though the currency of Nepal is called rupee and has no official connection to the tola. It is also used in most gold markets (bazars/souks) in the United Arab Emirates and in all the Cooperation Council for the Arab States of the Gulf (GCC) countries.

Tola is still used as a measure of charas (Indian hashish). On the black market, however, one tola equals a mass of approximately 10 g (0.35 oz) and not the actual mass of one tola.

== See also ==
- Bhori
- Troy ounce
