= Yojana =

Measure of distance

- Unit system: Arthashastra
- Unit of: length

Conversions
1 in ...	... is equal to ...
- SI units: 12.8 km ; 16 km (in ancient Cambodia)
- Imperial/US units: 2.7 miles

A yojana (Devanagari: योजन; Khmer language: យោជន៍; Thai: โยชน์; Burmese: ယူဇနာ) is a measure of distance that was used in ancient India, Cambodia, Thailand and Myanmar. Some sources define the unit as the distance an army can march in a day. Various textual sources from ancient India define Yojana as ranging from 3.5 to 15 km.

== Edicts of Ashoka (3rd century BCE) ==
Ashoka, in his Major Rock Edict No.13, gives a distance of 600 yojanas between the Maurya empire, and "where the Yona king named Antiyoga (is ruling)", identified as King Antiochus II Theos, whose capital was Babylon. A range of estimates, for the length of a yojana, based on the ~2,000 km from Baghdad to Kandahar, on the eastern border of the empire, to the ~4,000 km to the Capital at Patna, have been offered by historians.

....And this (conquest) has been won repeatedly by Devanampriya both [here] and among all (his) borderers, even as far as at (the distance of) six hundred yojanas where the Yona king named Antiyoga (is ruling), and beyond this Antiyoga, (where) four kings (are ruling), (viz, the king) named Tulamaya, (the king) named Antekina, (the king) named Maka, (and the king) named Alikyashudala, (and) likewise towards the south, (where) the Cholas and Pandyas (are ruling), as far as Tamraparni.

— 13th Major Rock Edict. Translation by E. Hultzsch (1857–1927).

== The Mahabharata (500 BCE – 300 CE) ==
Offers:

...

The Moon is handed down by memory to be eleven thousand yojanas in diameter. Its peripheral circle happens to be thirty three thousand yojanas when calculated.
...
The Sun is eight thousand yojanas and another two thousand yojanas in diameter. From that its peripheral circle comes to be equal to thirty thousand yojanas.

...

— "verses: 6.12.40–45, Bhishma Parva of the Mahabharata"

Given the Moon's diameter is now known to be approximately 3,475 km and mean radius of 1,737.4 km, while the Sun's diameter is approximately 1,391,400 km, the stated values offer conflicting lengths for a yojana, in the verse, between - 0.316 km and 139.14 km.

== Yojana in geodesy ==
Earth's diameter and/or circumference in yojanas as mentioned by classical Hindu astronomers (Note: Some cells are left empty because those astronomers did not explicitly give a value. The values not mentioned in the table can be approximated using the value of π prevalent during their period.)
	Diameter (12,756 km)	Circumference (40,075 km)
Aryabhata (476–550 CE)	1,050 yojana	
Surya Siddhānta (500-800 CE)	1,600 yojana	
Varahamihira (6th century CE)		3,200 yojana
Bhāskara I (c. 600 – c. 680 CE)	1,050 or 1600 yojana	
Brahmagupta (c. 598 – c. 668 CE)	1,581 yojana	5,000 yojana
Bhāskara II (1114–1185 CE)	1,581 yojana	4,967 yojana
Nilakantha Somayaji (1444 – 1545 CE)		3,300 yojana

== Hindu units of length ==
=== Units ===
In Hindu scriptures, Paramāṇu is the fundamental particle and smallest unit of length.

Measurement	Equivalence (in Hindu measurement)	Notes
8 to 30 Paramāṇus	1 trasareṇu (Note: Trasareṇu is also known as Rathāreṇu or Rathadhuli. Each scripture gives number of Paramāṇus in a Trasareṇu differently. In Ayurvedic scriptures, 1 Trasareṇu is 30 Paramāṇu; in Vasushastra texts, one Rathadhūli is 8 Paramāṇu)	As per Manusmriti, one trasareṇu is the size of the smallest moving speck of dust visible to the naked eye. (Note: jālāntaragate bhānau yat sūkṣmaṃ dṛśyate rajaḥ | prathamaṃ tat pramāṇānāṃ trasareṇuṃ pracakṣate ||132 || The small mote that is seen when the sun shines through a lattice-hole they declare to be the ‘triad,’ the very first of measures.—(132))
8 trasarenu	1 bālāgra (tip of a hair strand)	
8 bālāgra	1 likhsha (size of a nit) (Note: As per Manusmriti and Arthashastra, eight Trasareṇus equals one Liksha.)	
8 liksha	1 yūka (size of a louse)	
8 yūka	1 yava (width of barley grain of medium size)	
8 yava	1 aṅgula (finger-breadth)	Estimated between 1.73 cm (0.68 inches) to 1.91 cm (0.75 inches). (Note: The angula is defined in the Śulbasūtras as the length covered by 14 grains of millet arranged width-wise; Kautilya and later authors prefer 8 grains of barley (yava).)
6 angula	1 pada (the breadth of a foot)	other sources define this unit differently: see Pada (foot)
2 pada	1 vitasti (span or distance between the tip of the forefinger and wrist)	~ 22.86 cm (9 inches)
2 vitasti	1 hasta (cubit)	~ 45.7 cm (18 inches)
2 hasta	1 náriká	~ 91.5 cm (36 inches / 3 feet)
2 náriká	1 dhanu	~ 183 cm (72 inches / 6 feet) to 192 cm ( 75.6 inches / 6 feet 3.5 inches)
1 paurusa	a man's height with arms and fingers uplifted (standing reach)	~ 192 cm (75 inches)
2,000 dhanu	1 gavyuti or gorutam (distance at which a cow's call or lowing can be heard)	~ 3.66 to 3.84 km
4 gavyuti	1 yojana	~ 15 kilometers

== Variations in length ==
The length of the yojana varied over time and locale, its length has been estimated as:

- 13 km (8 mi) - 14th-century mathematician Paramesvara.
- 13 km (8 mi) - A. C. Bhaktivedanta Swami Prabhupada throughout his translations of the Bhagavata Purana.
- 10.8 km (6.7 mi) to 13.2 km (8.2 mi) - From The Ancient Geography of India, 1871, Alexander Cunningham, estimated by comparison with Chinese units of length.
- 8.0 km (5 mi) - 1997, Thompson, from dividing the earths diameter by the yojana circumferences offered In the Surya Siddhanta and Aryabhatiya (late 4th-century to 5th-century CE)

== See also ==
- Hindu cosmology
- History of measurement systems in India
- Hindu units of time
- Palya
- Rajju
- List of numbers in Hindu scriptures
