= Indian units of measurement =

Before the introduction of the metric system, one may divide the history of Indian systems of measurement into three main periods: the pre-Akbar period, the period of the Akbar system, and the British colonial period.

During the Indian pre ancient period, weights and measure systems varied from region to region, commodity to commodity, and rural to urban areas. The weights were based on the weight of various seeds (in particular the wheat berry and Ratti) and lengths were based on the length of arms and width of fingers. During his reign, the Mughal emperor Akbar realized a need for a uniform system, and used the weight of the barley corn as a standard. This did not replace the existing system; rather, it simply added another system of measurement.

When the British first began trading in India, they accepted barley corn as a unit for weighing gold. Eventually, the British introduced their own system for weighing gold. In 1956, the government of independent India passed the Standards of Weights Act, which would come into effect in 1958. The metric system was made mandatory for weights in October 1960, and for measures in April 1962.

== Conversion ==
In 1956, for metrication, the Indian government defined the Standards of Measurements Act (No. 89 of 1956, amended 1960, 1964) as follows:

Indian System	Metric System
1 Tola	11.6638038 g

The current definitions as per the UN are:

Indian System	Metric System
1 Tola	11.664 g

== Ancient system ==
These are the weights and measures popular in North India before the adoption of the metric system. There were different systems in Bengal, the Presidency of Madras, and Bombay. The following nomenclature was prevalent in North India until the metric system was established:

- 4 Chāwal (grain of rice) = 1 Dhan (weight of one wheat berry)
- 4 Dhan = 1 Ratti (seed of the 'Abrus precatorius' plant, called 'Surkh' by Abul Fazl in Ain-i-Akbari)
- 8 Ratti = 1 Masha
- 3 Masha (24 Ratti/96 Dhan) = 1 Tak
- 4 Tak (12 Masha/96 Ratti) = 1 Bhari

=== Conversion ===
- 1 Bhari = 11.66375 gram
- 3.75 Troy ounce = 10 Bhari
- Weight of 64 Dhan (Wheat berries) = Weight of 45 Jau (Barley corns)
- Weight of 1 Barley corn = 64.79891 milligrams

=== Commodity weight system ===
- 1 Bhari = 4 Siki
- 1 Kancha = 5 Siki
- 1 Chhataank = 4 Kancha
- 1 Chhataank = 5 Bhari
- 1 Adh-pav = 2 Chhataank = 1/8 Seer
- 1 Pav = 2 Adh-pav = 1/4 Seer (Pav means 1/4)
  (Pav is still used to this date; however, it has been modified to "a fourth of a kilogram".)
- 1 Adher = 2 Pav = 1/2 Seer
- In Hindi, 1/2 Seer = Adha (1/2) Seer, or Adheer
- 1 Seer = 2 Adheer = 4 Pav = 16 Chhataank = 80 Tola = 933.1 grams
- 1 Savaseer = 1 Ser + 1 Pav (1 1/4 Seer)
- 1 Savaseer weighed 100 Imperial rupees
- In Hindi, 1 1/4 Seer = Sava (1 1/4) Seer, or Savaseer
- 1 Dhaseer = 2 Savaseer = 2 1/2 Seer
- In Hindi, 2 1/2 Seer = Dhai (2 1/2) Seer, or Dhaseer
- 1 Paseri = 2 Adisari = 5 Seer
- In Hindi, 5 Seer = Panch (5) Seer, or Paseri for short
- 1 Daseri = 2 Pasri = 10 Seer
- In Hindi, 10 Seer = Das (10) Seer, or Daseri for short
- 1 Maund (mann or mun) = 4 Daseri = 8 Pasri = 40 Seer

=== Rice and grains volume measures ===
Grains were not weighed. Special hour-glass shaped measure were used to determine the volume.

Smallest unit = 1 Nilve

- 2 Nilve = 1 Kolve
- 2 Kolve = 1 Chipte (about quarter litre)
- 2 Chipte = 1 Mapte (about half litre)
- 2 Mapte = 1 Ser (about one litre)

=== Liquid volume measures ===
These were hour glass shaped measure used for Milk, Ghee, Oils. The bottom was round like an inverted dome, the top was like flared rim. This shape helped in pouring the liquids.

- 4 Chhataank = 1 Pav
- 4 Pav = 1 Seer
- 40 Seer = 1 Maund

=== Length measure ===
Measure of length is Gaz. To interpret Gaz, depends on what one is measuring and where they are. Bengal: 36", Bombay: 27", Madras: 33", Government Average: 33". The hand measurements were used.

- Anguli (width of 3 fingers) = 1 Girah
- 8 Girah = 1 Hath (elbow to the end of the middle finger, approximately 18" )
- 5 5/6 Hath = One Kathi
- 20 Kathi = One Pand
- 1 Pand = 1 Beesa
- 20 Pand = One Begah
- 2 Hath = 1 Gaz
- 3 Gaz = Two Karam
- 3 Karams = 1 Kan
- 3 Square Kans = 1 Marla
- 20 Marlas = 1 Kanal
- 8 Kanals = 1 Ghamaon
- 9 Kanals 12 Marlas = 1 Acre
- 4 Kanals = 1 Begah

== Medieval system ==
=== Akbar weights and measures ===
Akbar standardised weights and measurements using a barley corn (Jau). For weights, he used the weight of a Jau, while the width of a Jau set the standard for length.

1. Length: Ilahi Gaz (33 to 34 inches or 840 to 860 millimetres); 1 Gaz = 16 Grehs; 1 Greh = 2 pais

At the time of Shah Jahan there existed three different Gaz:

Indian System	Metric System
Shahi gaz	101.6 cm
Shahijahani/Lashkari	95.85 cm
Aleppo gaz	67.73 cm

- Shahi gaz = 101.6 cm
- Shahijahani or Lashkari = 95.85 cm
- Aleppo gaz = 67.73 cm
- Commodity weight: Ser = 637.74 grams
- Commodity Spices: The Dam was a copper coin used as a weight as well as currency. 1 Dam = 20 grams
- Gold and Expensive Spices: Misqal = 6.22 grams

== Weights before 1833 ==
Indian System	British Troy Weight	Imperial System	Metric System
1 rattī	0.003(6) oz t	0.004(0) oz	0.113(4) g
1 māshā (8 ratti)	0.029(2) oz t	0.032(0) oz	0.907(2) g
1 tolā (12 masha)	0.3500(0) oz t	0.3840(0) oz	10.88(6) g
1 seer (80 tola)	28.000(0) oz t	1.920(0) lb	870.89(8) g
1 maund (40 seer)	93 lb t 4.00(1) oz t	5.4857(12) st	34.835(9) kg

- 8 rattī = 1 māshā (0.9072 gram)
- 12 māshā = 1 tolā (10.886227 gram)
- 80 tola = 1 seer (870.89816 gram)
- 40 seer = 1 maund (34.835926 kilogram)
- 1 rattī = 1.75 grain (0.11339825 gram or 113.39825 milligram) (1 grain = 0.064799 gram)

From 1833, the rupee and tolā weight was fixed at 180 grains, i.e. 11.66382 grams. Hence, the weight of 1 maund increased to 37.324224 kilograms. Traditionally, one maund represented the weight unit for goods which could be carried over some distance by porters or pack animals.
