= Manhala =

Town in Lahore District, Punjab, Pakistan

Manhala منہالہ خان خانہ
- Union Council of Pakistan
- Manhala Khan Khana
- Remnants of Manhala Sarai Khan Khana

- Location in Pakistan Manhala (Pakistan)
- Coordinates: 31°31′43.7″N 74°32′35.9″E
- Country: Pakistan
- Province: Punjab
- District: Lahore
- Tehsil: Wagah
- Union Council: 180

Area
  - Total: 21.45 km^{2} (8.28 sq mi)
- Time zone: UTC+5 (PKT)

Manhala (منہالہ), also known as Manhala Khan Khana and Sarai Khan Khana, is an old town and Union Council in the Lahore District of Punjab, Pakistan. It is located near the India–Pakistan border and is one of the larger settlements in the Wagah tehsil, situated on the eastern side of the BRB Canal.

== History ==
The town was established in the 1590s during the Mughal period under Emperor Akbar. Local history links its foundation to his minister and general, Abdul Rahim Khan-i-Khanan, after whom the settlement was historically known as "Manhala Khan-i-Khanan".

In historical geography, particularly as documented in the research compilation The Silk Roads, Manhala occupied a strategic position as the first major halting station for travelers entering present-day Pakistan from India via Sarai Amanat Khan and Qila Jiwan Singh (Purani Bhaini Sandhwan), before they headed toward Lahore's Delhi Gate.

To accommodate the heavy traffic of traders and officials along this imperial route, Abdul Rahim Khan-i-Khanan commissioned a sizeable caravanserai here, recorded in historical accounts as Sarai Khan-i-Khanan (and identified by contemporary travelers like William Finch as the Cancanna Sarai), though no physical traces of this structure remain today. The town's Mughal-era significance is further highlighted by a pair of 6-to-9-metre-high Kos Minarss (milestones) erected during Jahangir's reign. However, time and neglect have taken a toll on these monuments; by the late 20th century, field observations indicated that one minar had been entirely lost, while the surviving one was in a highly precarious state. Beyond Manhala, the old highway snaked through Brahmanabad and Mahfuzpura (now Baoli Camp) before finally reaching the walled city.

Remnants of historic Mughal-era brickwork at Manhala.

For generations, Manhala was a major estate owned by the Sandhu clan of Jats. British colonial records, including the Lahore District Gazetteers, document it as a large village under the management of the local Sandhu families. After the Partition of India in 1947, the Muslim branch of these families stayed in the village and looked after the older buildings.

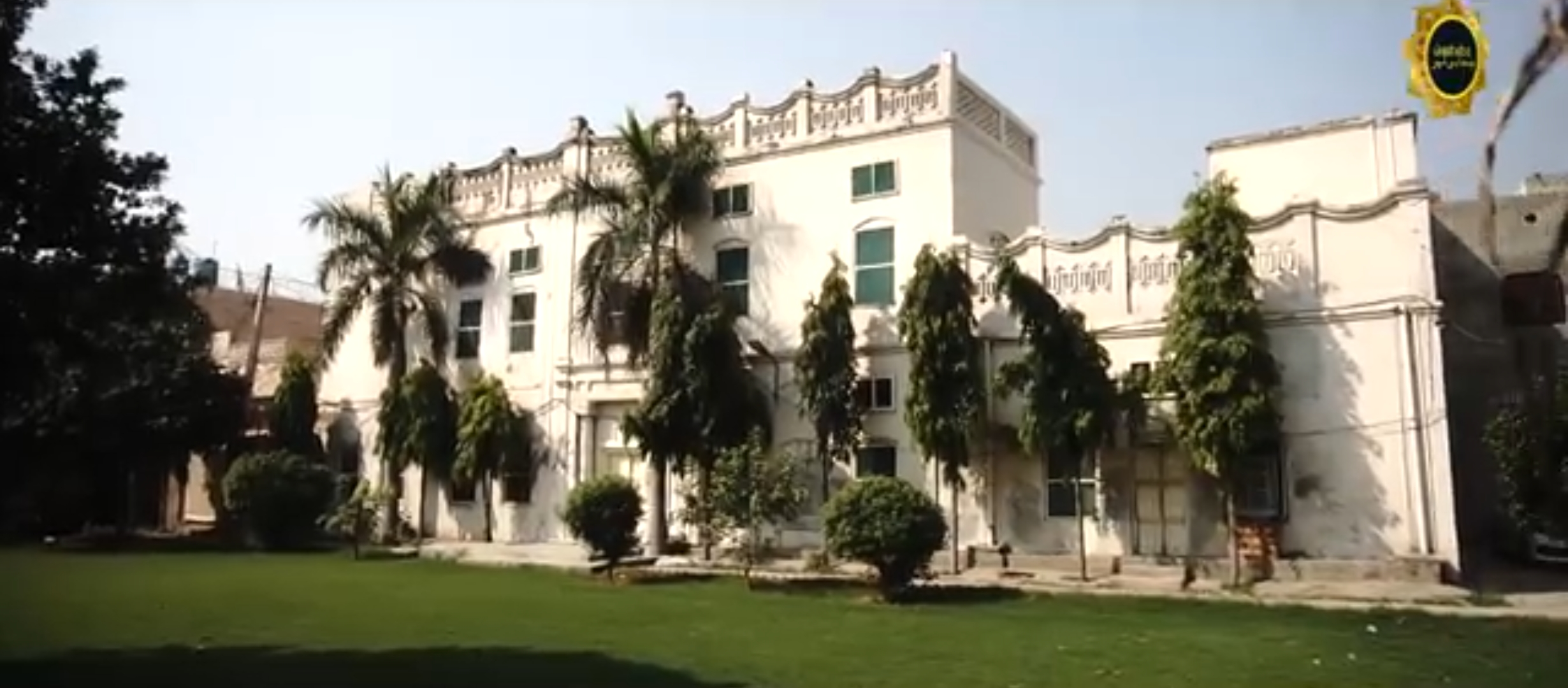
The historic Haveli structure in Manhala, a remnant of pre-partition architecture.

Old maps show how the town changed over time along the roads east of Lahore. Originally, it appeared as a wayside inn (serai). On Aaron Arrowsmith's 1804 map (Upper Sheet: Map of India), the place is named "Seray Khan Khanum". A shorter version of this name, "Kan Kanan", appears on Aaron Arrowsmith Jr.'s 1825 Punjab map.

By 1839, a British map by the Society for the Diffusion of Useful Knowledge (SDUK) spelled it as "Mamhala" within the Bari Doab region. An 1846 German military map (Uebersicht des gegenwärtigen Kriegsschauplatzes in Indien) lists it as "Manihala" and shows it as the first big road junction east of Lahore, where the road splits towards 'Harriki' (Harike) and 'Bhyrowal'. Later publications, like Carl Ritter's 1851 map of Central Asia and Carl Flemming's 1855 map (Der Sikh-Staat), continue to mark the village as "Mamhala" on the local road network.

== Geography and infrastructure ==
Manhala is located about 4 kilometres from the border with India. It serves as a local market town and connection point for smaller nearby villages along Manhala Road. According to the Lahore district administration, Manhala is listed as Union Council No 180.

The principal commercial area of the settlement is the Main Bazaar Manhala, which is located on Manhala Road and serves residents of the town and neighbouring villages.

Healthcare services are provided through a government Basic Health Unit (BHU) and a Civil Veterinary Hospital (CVH). In addition, a number of licensed private medical stores and healthcare outlets operate in the area.

Educational institutions in Manhala include government primary schools, the Government Boys High School Manhala Kalan, the Government Girls Higher Secondary School Manhala Kalan, and schools operated by The Citizens Foundation (TCF).

The town contains a public sports ground which has hosted kabaddi competitions organised under the Punjab Sports and Youth Affairs Department.

The town still contains a Mughal-era Kos Minar milestone, which is a protected historical site under the Punjab Archaeology Department.
