= Dwadasha Jyotirlinga Temple =

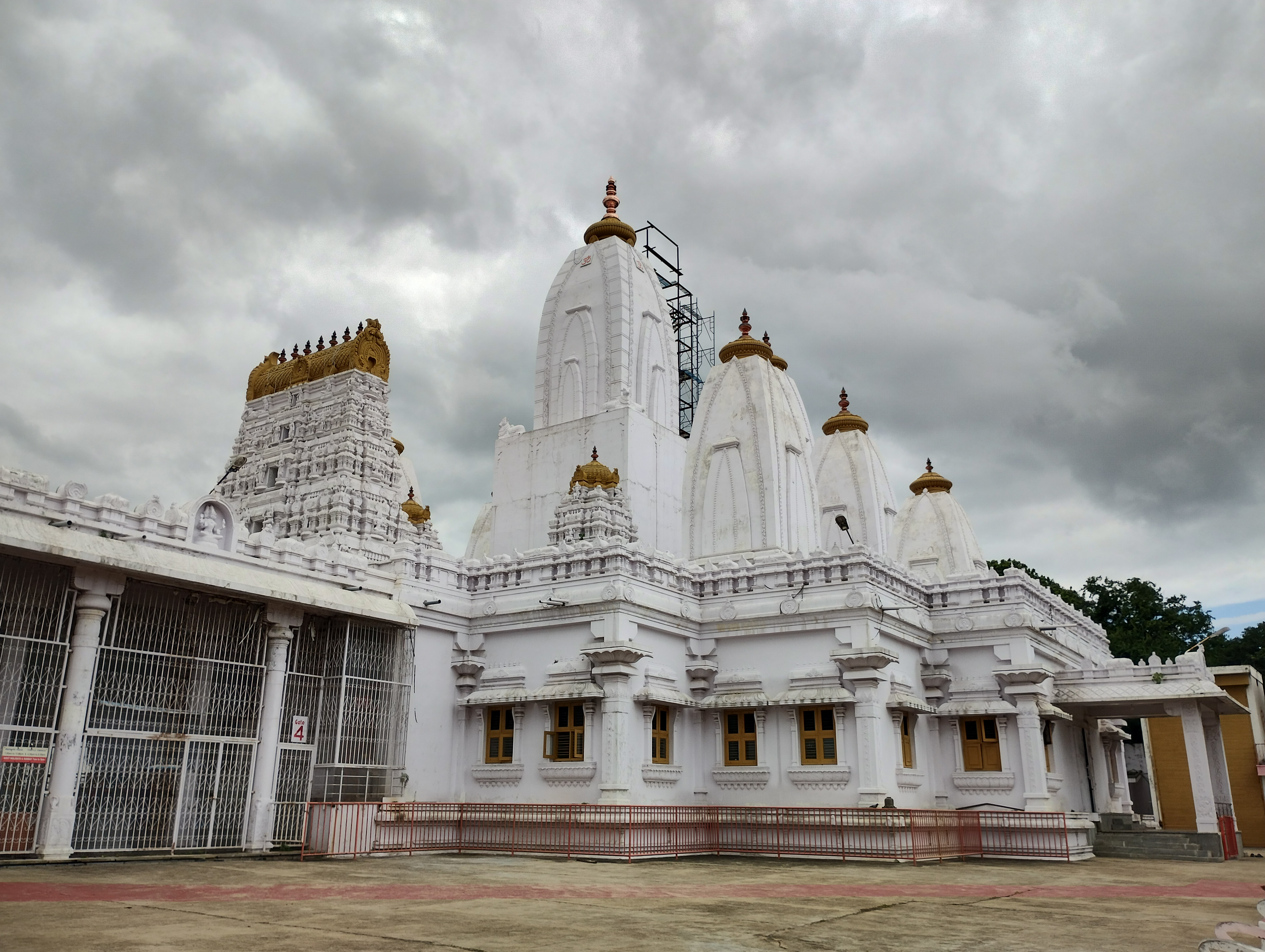

Religion
- Affiliation: Hinduism
- District: Bangalore Urban
- Deity: Sri Omkareshwar (Shiva)

Location
- Location: Bangalore
- State: Karnataka
- Country: India
- Interactive map of Dwadasha Jyotirlinga Temple
- Coordinates: 12°58′N 77°38′E

Architecture
- Type: Temple

Website
- https://www.omkarhills.org/

Sri Dwadasha Jyotirlinga Temple is located in Bangalore, in the state of Karnataka, India. The temple is located in Omkar Ashram, in Omkar Hills Bangalore. Omkar Hills in Srinivasapura is one of the highest points of Bangalore. The Sri Dwadasha Jyotirlinga Devasthana is unique, and one of the most magnificent and gigantic temples in Karnataka.

== Importance ==
In Sri Dwadasha Jyotirlinga temple, the 12 representative Jyotirlingas of the original Puranik twelve Jyotirlingas, which are in different parts of the country, are in one temple, each with an individual Garbhagraha and Vimanagopuram. The Dwadasha (12) Jyotirlingas are very sacred and auspicious and are different from the ordinary shiva lingams. As per the Shastras, the darshanam of even a single Jyotirlinga will lead to moksha. In Sanskrit, jyoti means light. So a Jyotirlinga is a shrine where Lord Shiva, is worshipped in the form of a Jyotirlingam or "Lingam of light." Puranas say that Lord Shiva first manifested himself as a Jyotirlinga on the night of the Arudra Nakshatra and thus the special reverence for the Jyotirlinga. The names and the locations of the 12 Jyotirlingas are mentioned in the Shiva Purana.

This Dwadasha Jyotirlinga temple is in the Omkar ashram which is an abode of temples and religious activities, namely - Sri Matsya Narayana temple, Sri Vanadurga temple, Sri Nagadevatha temple, Sri Muneeshwara temple, Goshala, Vishwamitra Veda Vidyalaya, Sacred Banyan tree, Religious harmony memorial, giant tower clock which is one of the biggest clock in the world and a monastery. Hence a pilgrimage to this Dwadasha Jyotirlinga theertha kshetra and having darshan of all the temples and the blessings of sanyasins, will remove all the nava graha doshas (defects of the nine astrological planets) which are the source of all miseries and brings abundant grace, joy, health, wealth and peace.

== History ==
This temple was founded by Brahmaleena Sadguru Sri Shivapuri Mahaswamiji with the intention of providing an opportunity to each and every devotee, for Jyotirlinga darshana, which otherwise requires health, wealth and time, as the original Jyotirlinga temples are in different parts of India. It also serves the purpose of propagating awareness, significance and uniqueness of these twelve Jyotirlingas to the younger generation.

The construction of this temple was started in 2002 by Sri Shivapuri Mahaswamiji, and it continued for many years. However, before he could complete this divine task, he attained Samadhi, (left his mortal coil) in 2007. The Pranaprathishta (consecration) of the 12 Jyotirlingas and Mahakumbhabhishekam of the Temple was done by Sri Swami Madhusudhanananda Puri on the Auspicious day of Wednesday, 16 February 2011, in the divine presence of many Saints, Holy men, purohits and others with elaborate rituals, Japas, Homams and Poojas.

== Temple ==
Sri Omkareshwar

Inside the main temple, the 12 Jyotirlingas are seen along with Sri Vidyaganapathi, Sri Subrahmanya, Sri Kalabhairava, Sri Chandikeshwara, Ekadasha (11) Rudradevatas, Panchaloha Nataraja weighing around 1000 kg and the Divine Mother Shakti in the form of Sri Yantra. Of these Twelve Jyotirlingas, the Omkareshwara Jyotirlinga measuring around 6 Feet in height, is at the centre of the temple, encircled by the other Eleven Jyotirlingas. Omkareshwara Jyotirlinga is the main Jyotirlinga of this temple. In this Sri Dwadasha Jyothirlinga Devasthana all the 12 Jyothirlingas are along with the Shakthi in the form of Sri Yantras. The Spatika Sri Yantra is in the Omkareswara Jyothirlinga and in the remaining 11 jyothirlingas Panchaloha Sri Yantras are there. All the 12 Jyotirlingas face east.

The Vimana Gopurams, of Srisaila Mallikarjuna and Sri Rameshwara Jyotirlingas which are in South India, are in the South Indian style and the Vimana Gopurams of the remaining Ten Jyotirlingas which are in North India, are in the North Indian Style. Hence, this temple is a harmony of South Indian and North Indian sculpture. The height of the Vimana Gopuram of the main Jyotirlinga, Sri Omkareshwara, approximately 108 feet from the ground level, is the highest among all the Vimana Gopurams.

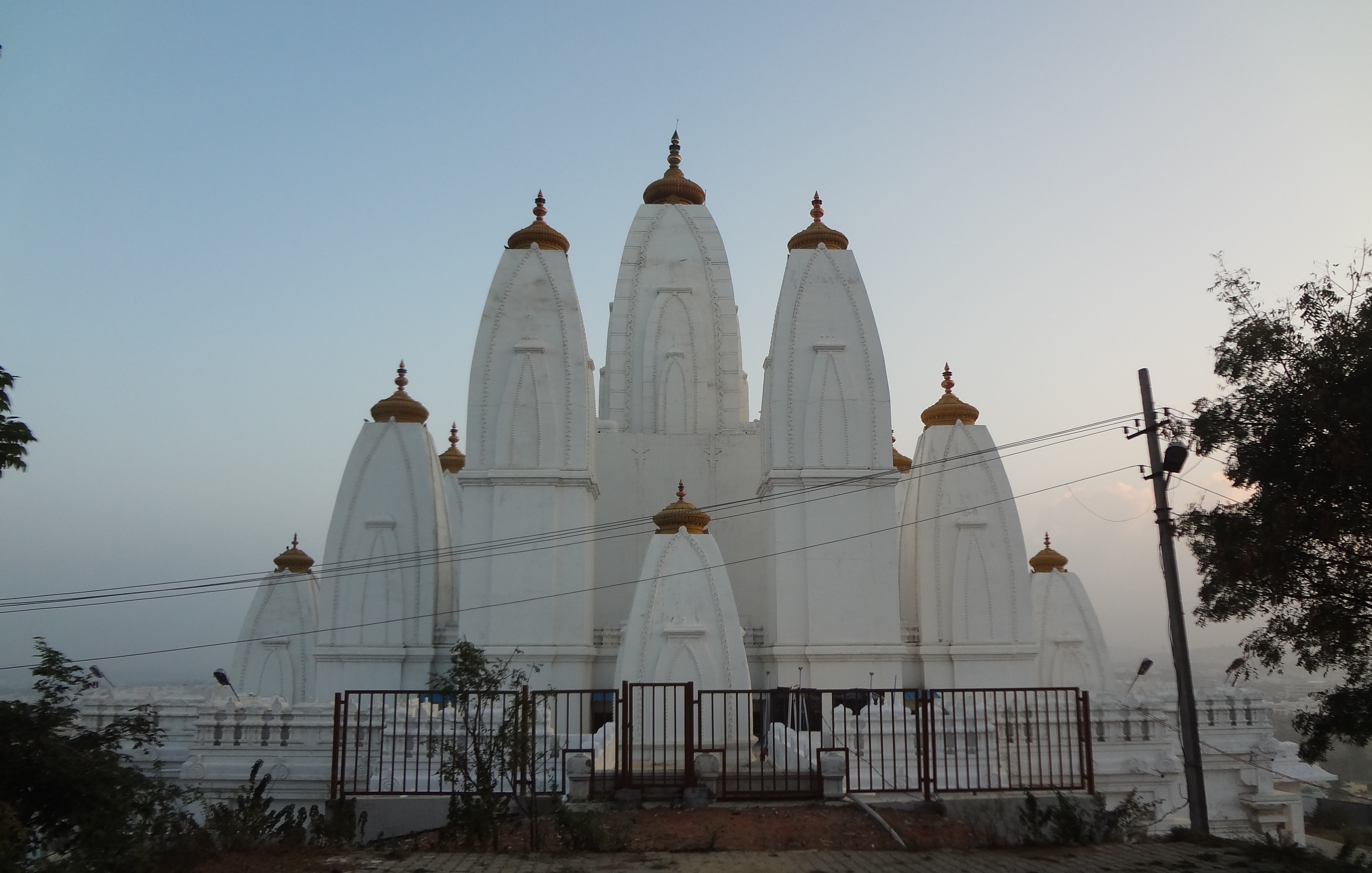
Dwadasha Jyotirlinga Temple in Omkar Hills

Salient features of Pranapratishta

All the 12 Jyotirlingas are Narmadeshwara Lingas (also known as Baana Lingas) made from the Stones of the River Narmada, which is very auspicious for Shivalinga. Beneath each and every Jyotirlinga, 1008 Small Narmadeshwara Lingas measuring around an inch in length are placed, but below Sri Omkareshwara linga, 2008 Small Narmada Lingas are placed. So in total the temple consists of visible 12 main Jyotirlingas and around 13000 (thirteen thousand) invisible Narmadeshwara Lingas.

Sri Matsya Narayana Temple
The Sri Matsyanarayana Temple is unique, and the only temple in Karnataka for Bhagavan Sri Matsyanarayana Swamy. Sri Matsanarayana Temple faces east and is located behind the Dwadasha Jyotirlinga Temple in Omkar Hills. Bhagavan Sri Matsyanarayana is the first Avatara among the Dashavataras (Ten Avataras) of Bhagavan MahaVishnu in the form of Fish to protect the creation from great deluge. By worshiping him, through his grace generally one gains health, wealth, peace and prosperity and specially one gets cured of rare skin diseases and gains abundant wealth. Where ever Bhagavan Sri Matsyanarayana’s presence is there all the Vastu Doshas will get nullified.

Sri Mata Vana Durga
The Divine mother Sri Vana Durga is the presiding deity and the sthana-devata of the Omkara Hills. Vana Durga is one of the numerous forms of Goddess Durga. As the name indicates, she resides in forests and hills. The temples of Vana Durga are always open to air. She is a living deity staying under the sacred banyan tree at the top of the Omkar Ashram hill. Time and again, many blessed devotees' vivid experiences about the Mother testify her divine presence in Omkar Hills.

Mother Sri Vana Durga protects and progresses this Omkara Ashrama. She is fond of camphor. Any devotee in distress or difficulty can invoke her divine blessings by offering camphor with sincere faith. One who worships Mother with devotion gains peace and prosperity through her bountiful benevolence and grace.

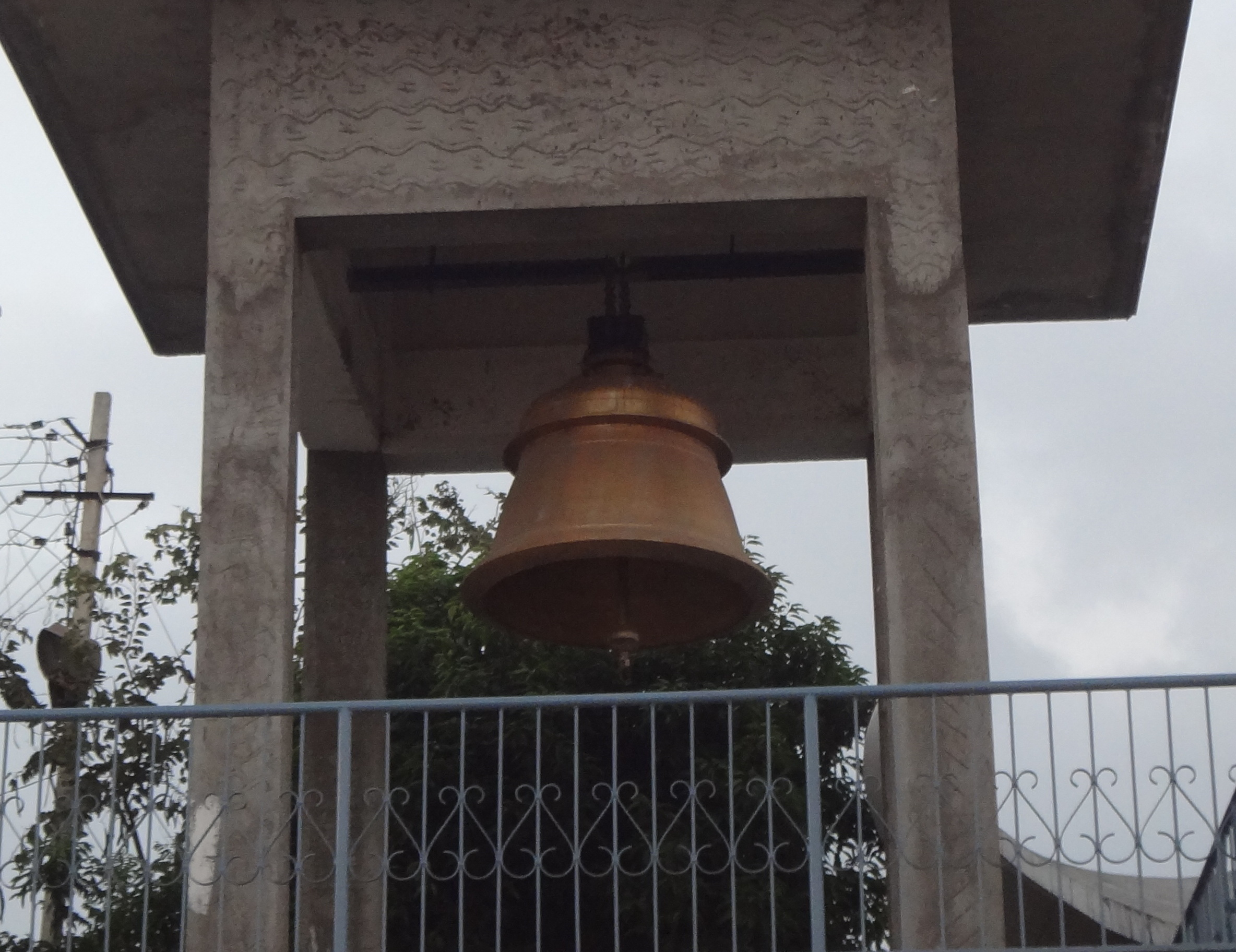
1200 kg bell in Omkar Hills

Sri Nagadevata Temple
Sri Nagadevata temple in Omkara Hills has a unique male and female Nagadevata. To the right of the Nagadevata is a banyan tree and to left is a neem tree. Daily pujas will be done to the devata.

Omkar Hills also has small temples of Lord Sri Muneshwara and Lord Sri Maha Ganapathi. A massive bronze bell, weighing around 1200 kg, which is one of the second biggest and heaviest bells in the country, is placed in the Dwadahsa temple complex for the temple use.

== Worship and festivals ==
Daily Rudrabhishekam and pooja will be performed to all the Jyotirlingas from morning 7:00 AM to 8:00 AM. On Karthika Somavara, rudrabhishekam would be performed from 7:00 AM to 9 AM. Rudrabhishekam ticket cost is 150 rupees per one jyothirlinga. Paksha pradosha Pooja is also performed at this Temple along with other varieties of sevas. For 10 years pradosha Pooja 30000 rupees is charged, Prasad would be sent to donor for 10 years. During festivals, special poojas, homas etc., will also be performed. Pradosha poojas and Sankashtahara Ganapathi poojas are done regularly. The temple is open for darshan from 7 AM to 12.30 PM and from 4.30 PM to 8PM on Monday to Saturday and on Sundays and holidays, the temple is open for darshan from 7 AM to 8 PM.

The Dwadasha Jyotirlinga temple celebrates 2 major annual festivals. The annual festival of Maha Shivaratri is celebrated on Magha Krishna Chaturdashi (February - March) every year. During the annual festival of Karthika Maasa (mid October - November), special abhishekas, poojas, Deepothsavas and homam rituals will be done during the entire Karthika month with special alakaram to all Jyotirlingas on all the 4 Mondays.
