= Beerakuppam =

- Village
- Interactive map of Beerakuppam
- Location in Andhra Pradesh, India Beerakuppam (India)
- Coordinates: 13°27′18″N 79°50′47″E
- Country: India
- State: Andhra Pradesh
- District: Tirupati
- Mandal: Nagalapuram
- Talukas: Satyavedu

Languages
  - Official: Telugu
- Time zone: UTC+5:30 (IST)
- PIN: 517589

Beerakuppam is a small village in Nagalapuram Mandal in Tirupati district in the state of Andhra Pradesh in India. Beerakuppam is in Satyavedu Assembly Constituency.
