= Vedanarayana Temple, Nagalapuram =

Hindu temple in India

Vedanarayana Temple, Nagalapuram వేదనారాయణ దేవస్థానం, నాగలాపురం
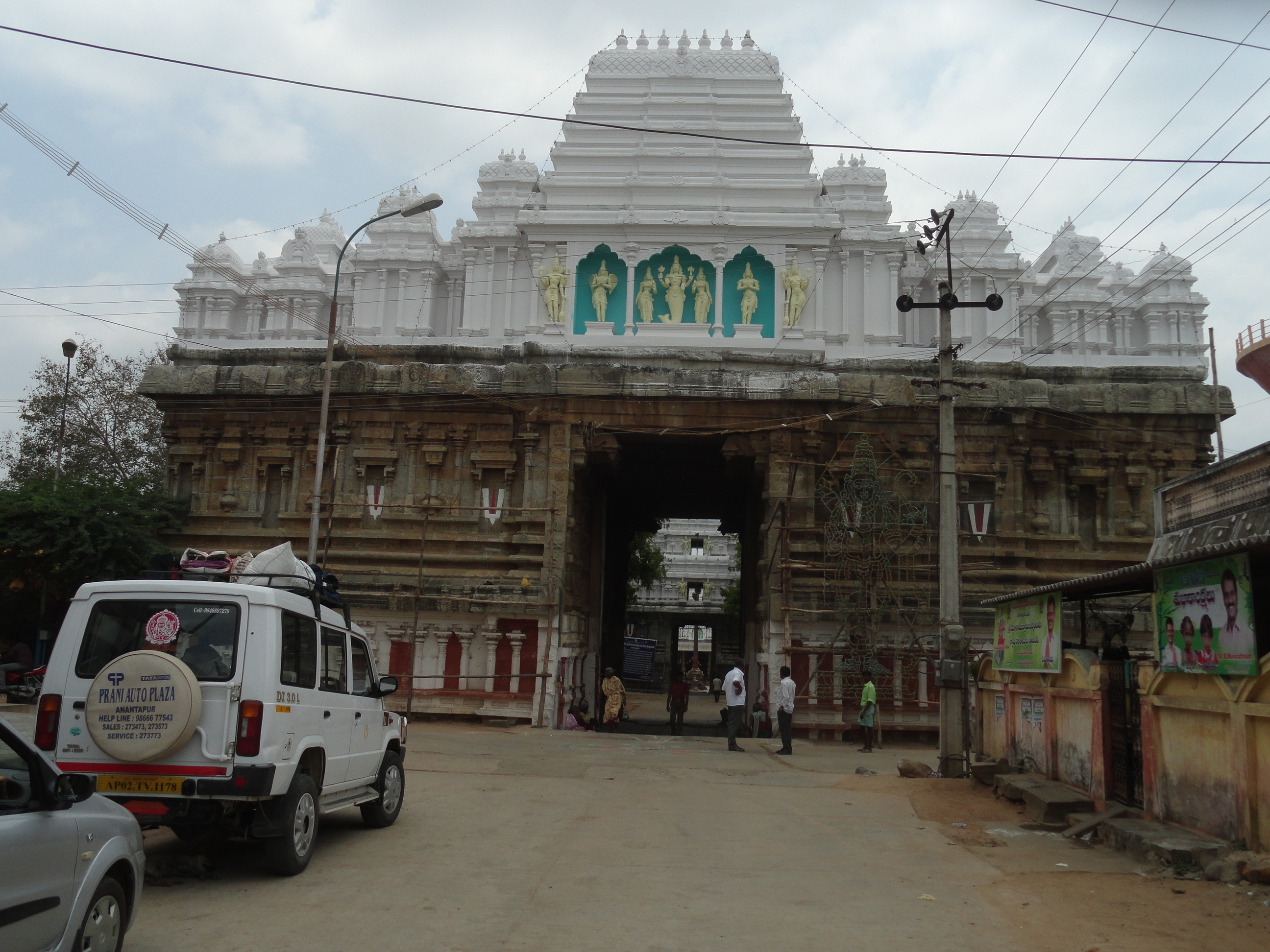
- Raja gopuram at vedanarayana Temple, Nagalapuram

- Location in Andhra Pradesh

Religion
- Affiliation: Hinduism
- District: Tirupati
- Deity: Vedanarayana (Matsya avatar of Vishnu)
- Festivals: Brahmotsavams, Vaikunta Ekadasi
- Governing body: Tirumala Tirupati Devasthanams

Location
- Location: Nagalapuram
- State: Andhra Pradesh
- Country: India
- Coordinates: 13°23′15.7″N 79°47′48.7″E

Architecture
- Type: Dravidian architecture
- Temple: 2
- Inscriptions: Telugu and Sanskrit

Website
- www.tirumala.org

Vedanarayana Temple or Matsya Narayana Temple is a Hindu temple in Nagalapuram, Andhra Pradesh, India. It is a Vaishnava temple to Vishnu in the form of Matsya, the fish avatar, who is referred to as Matsya Narayana or Veda Narayana. This is one of the few temples in India where Vishnu is depicted in Matsya avatar, the first incarnation of the Dashavatara, Vishnu's 10 main incarnations.

It is administered by Tirumala Tirupati Devasthanams.

== Significance ==
The Temple is famous for Surya Pooja Utsavam, considered as an astronomical marvel. During this festival the sunrays will directly fall on the presiding deity Vedanarayaana in the Garbhagriha for three days of a year. The Sunrays travel a distance of 360 feet starting from Temple Tower(Goupuram) towards Garbha griha in the evening. On first day the rays will stop at foot of the Deity, second day on Navel and third day on Crown.

== Festivals ==
Surya Pooja Utsavam is one of the important festivals in the temple during which the rays of Sun directly fall on to the presiding deity in Garbhagriha which is facing west during evening before sunset.
