= Omkar Hills =

Small hill in South Bangalore, Karnataka, India

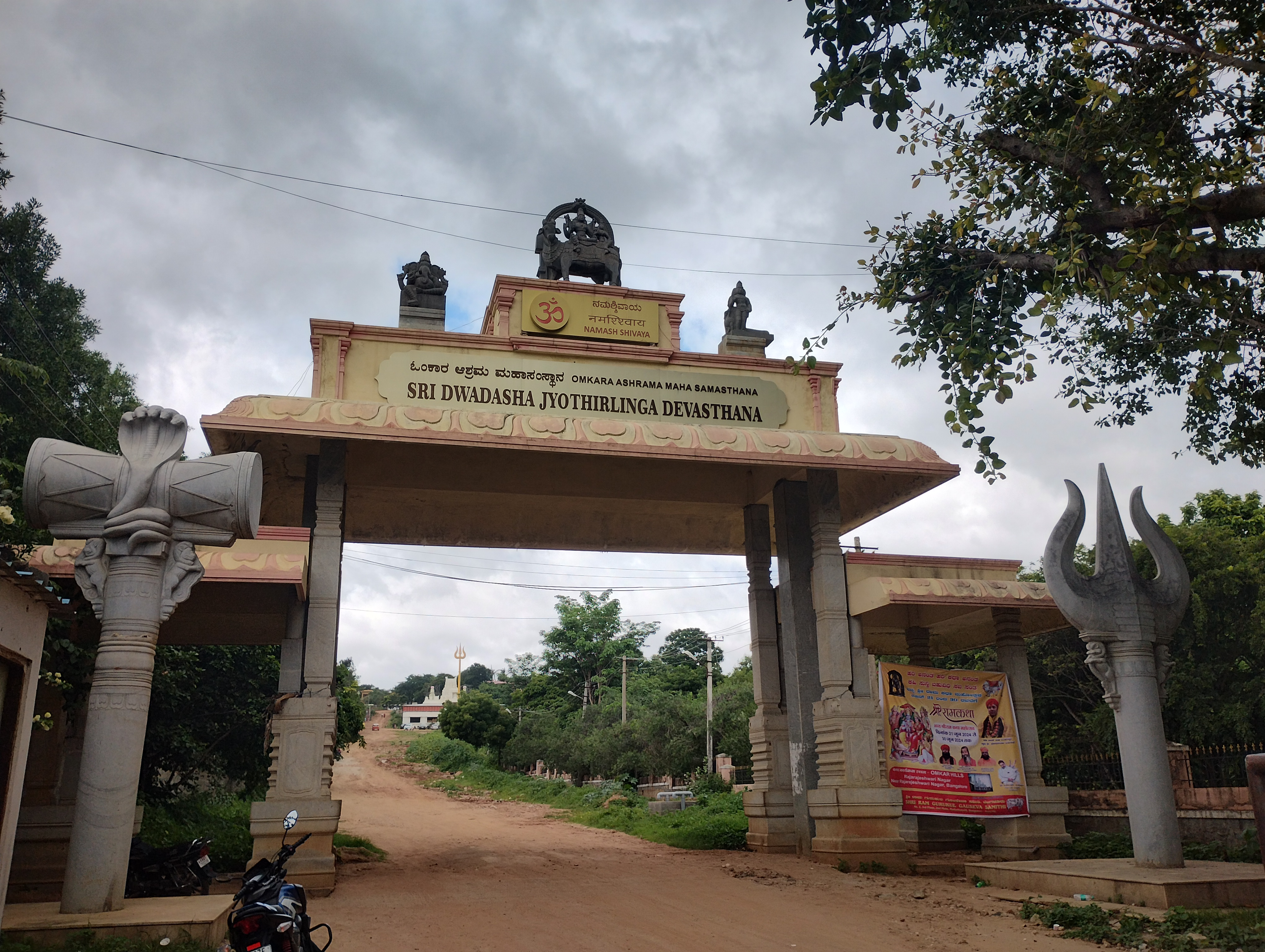
Arch at hill entrance

Omkareshwara Hill is a small hill in Rajarajeshwari Nagar in South Bangalore. At 2800 ft above the sea level this place is one of the highest points in Bangalore.

It is home to Matsya Narayana Temple and Dwadasha Jyotirlinga Temple.

== Clock tower ==
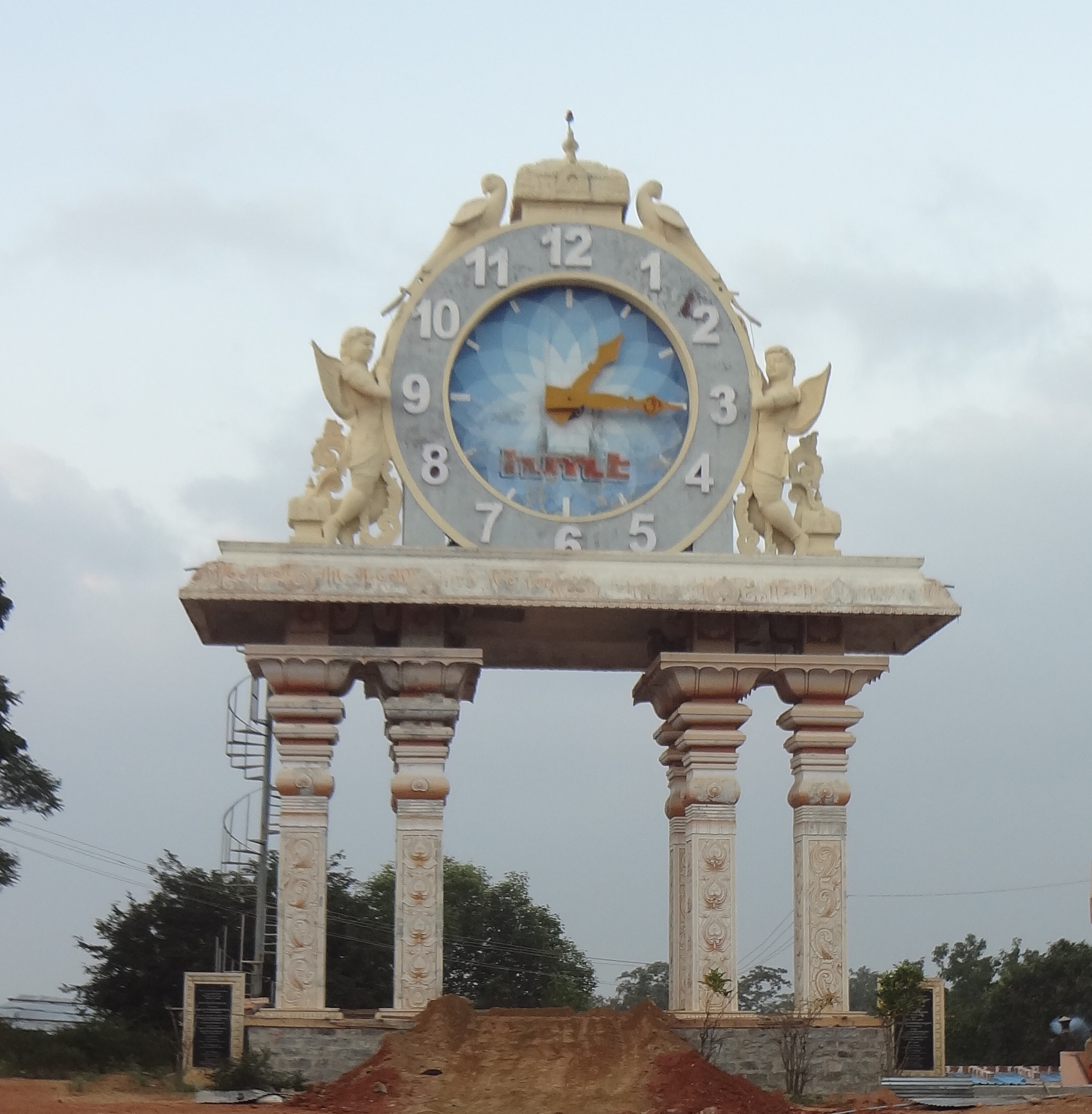
Clock tower

A clock tower on Omkar Hills is the second largest in the world, according to an article in The Hindu.

== Gallery ==
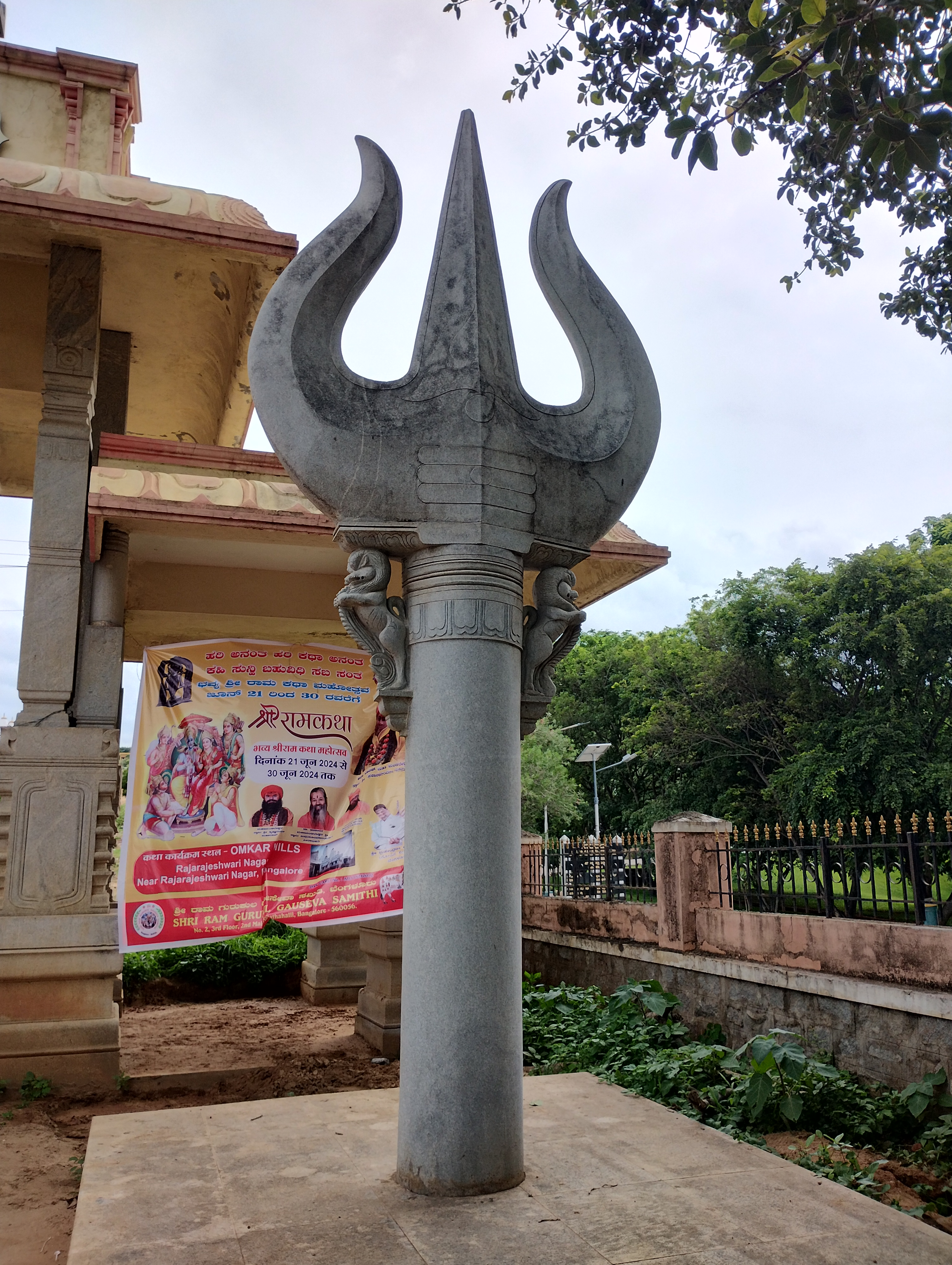
Trishula at hill entrance

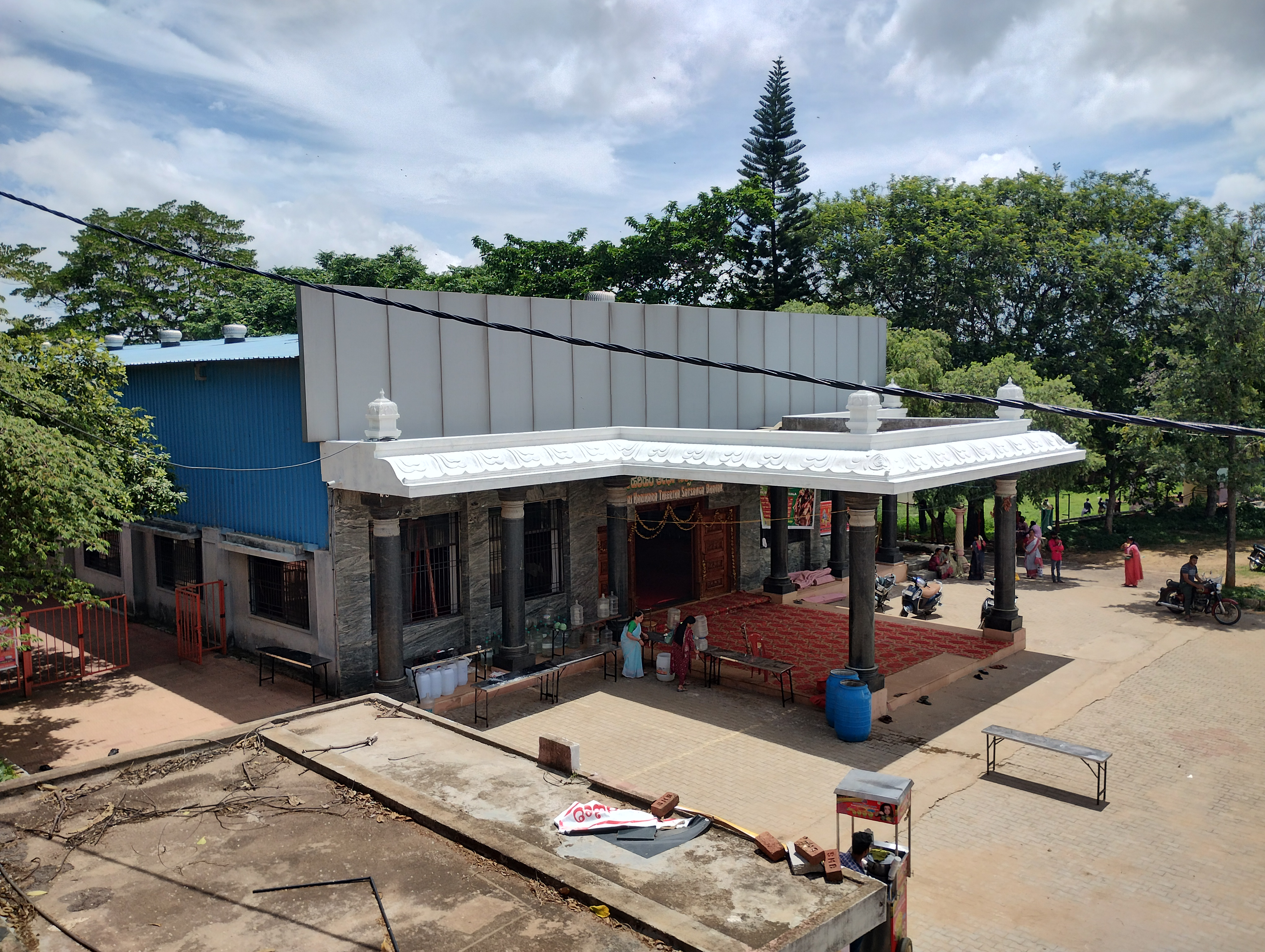
Sri Harihara Theertha Satsanga Bhavan

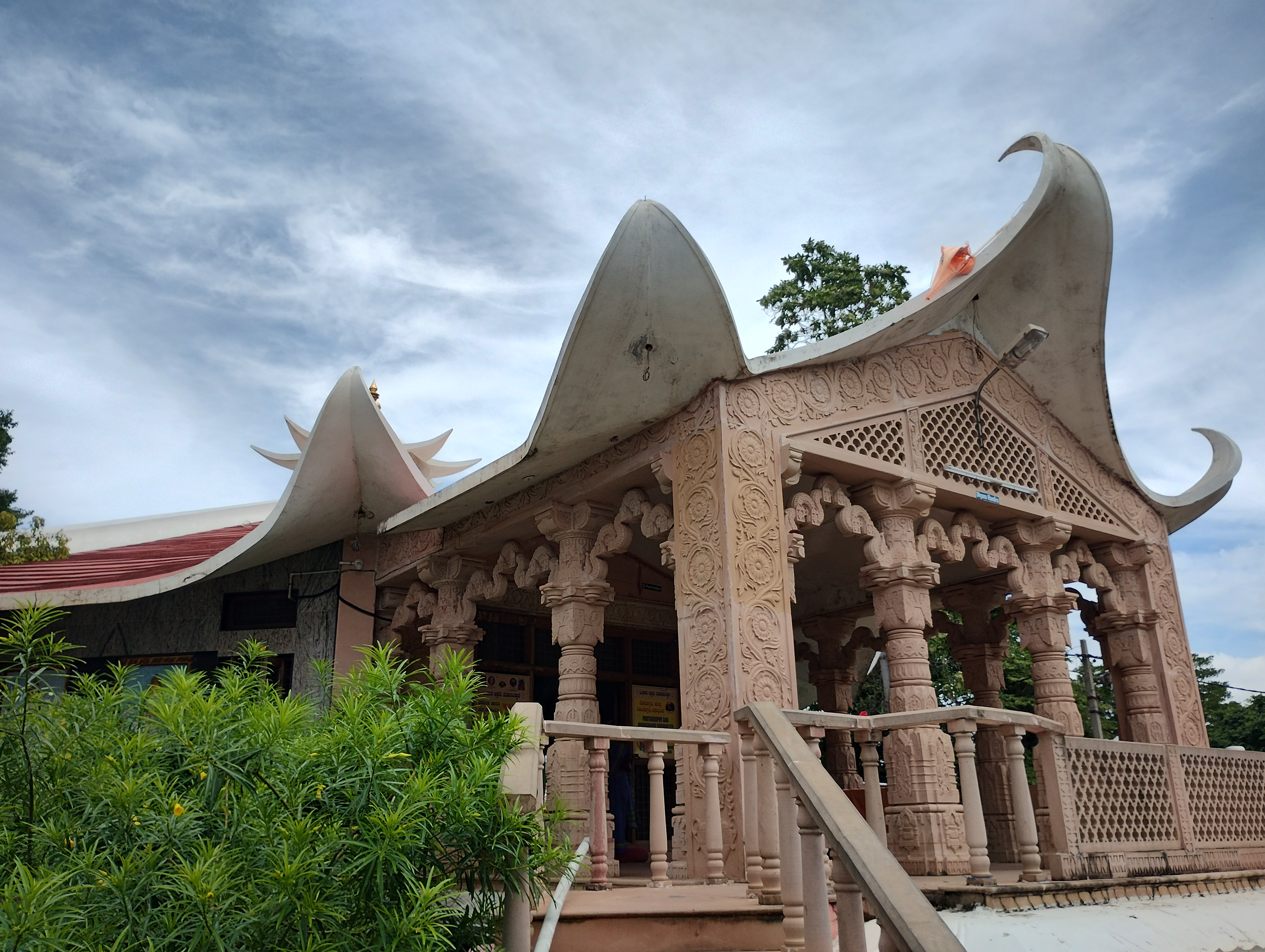
Dhyana Mandira

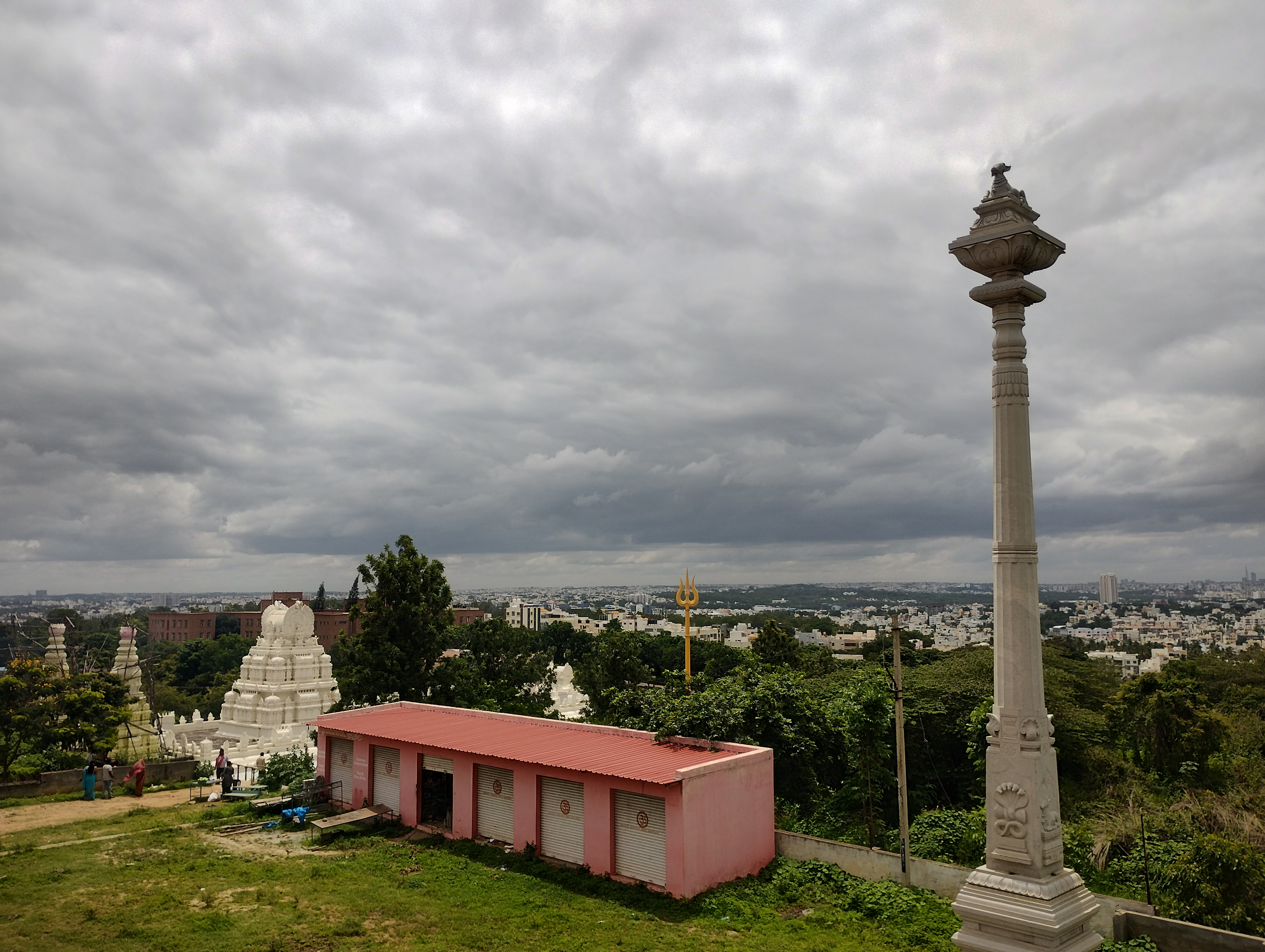
Aerial view from the hill

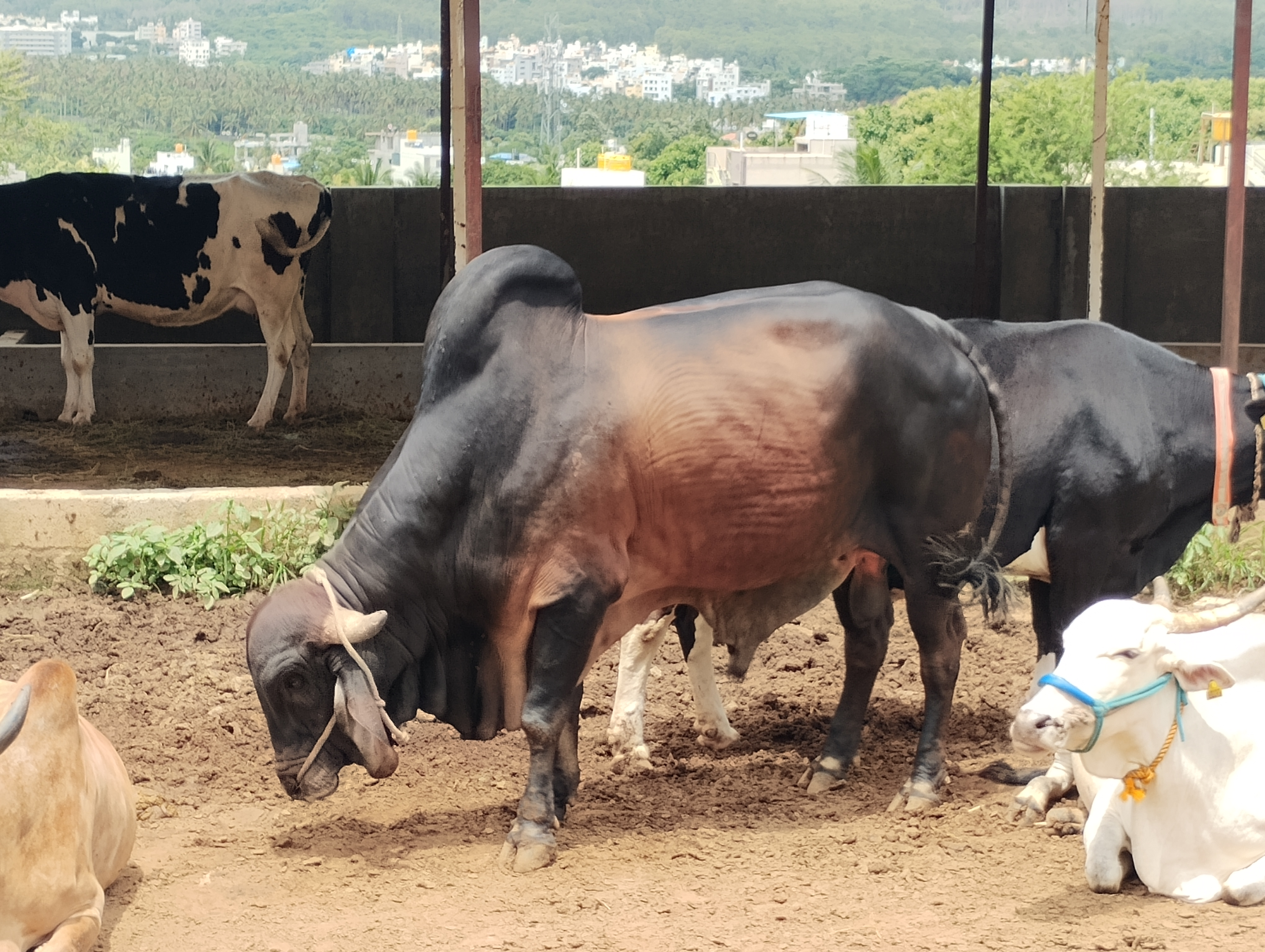
Animals at the hill
