= Matsya Narayana Temple, Bengaluru =

Hindu temple of the god Matsya in Bangalore, India

Sri Matsya Narayana Temple
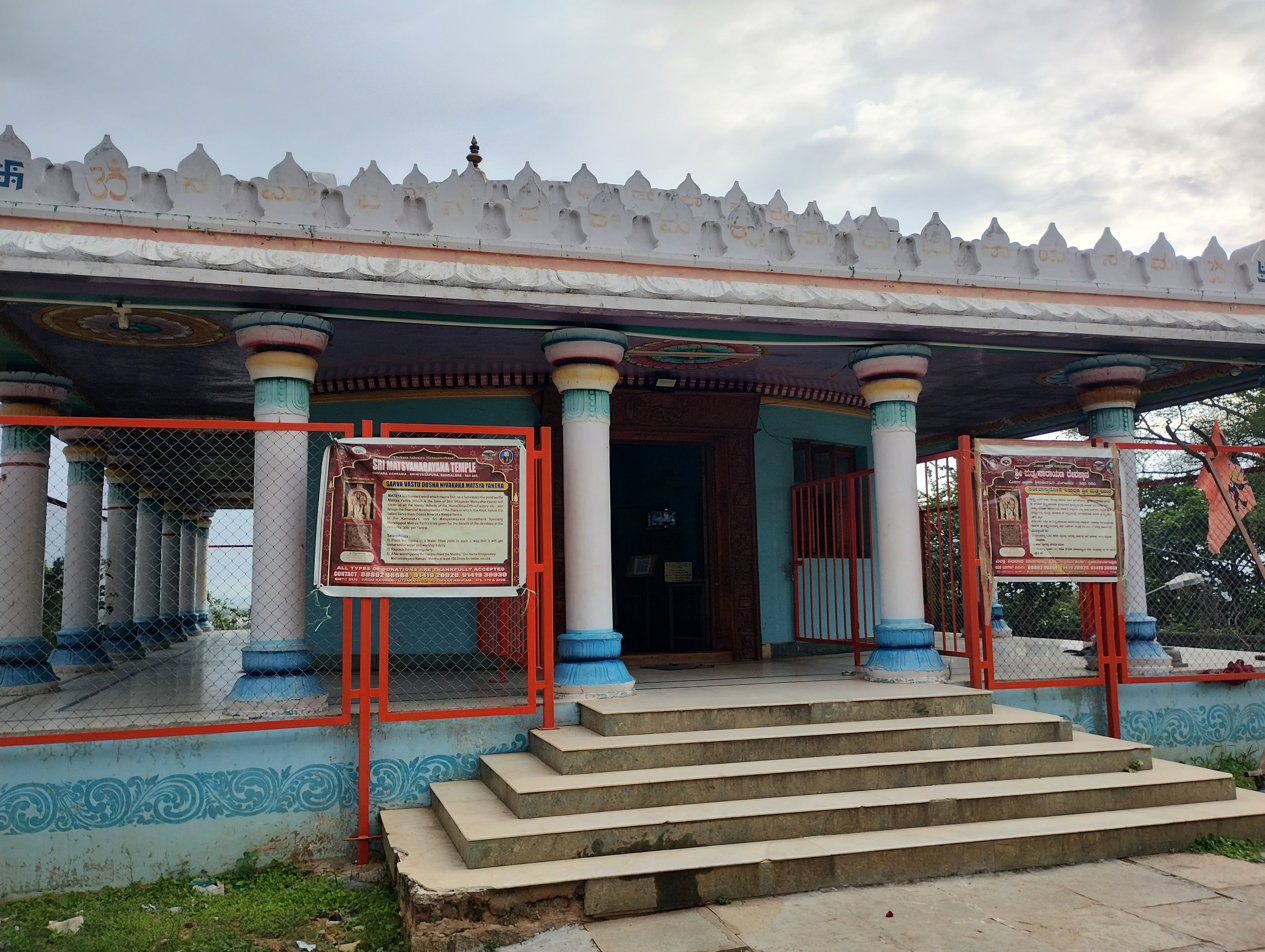
- Frontside of temple in July, 2024

Religion
- Affiliation: Hinduism
- District: Bangalore
- Deity: Sri Matsya Narayana (Vishnu)

Location
- Location: Bangalore
- State: Karnataka
- Country: India
- Interactive map of Sri Matsya Narayana Temple
- Coordinates: 12°58′N 77°38′E

Architecture
- Type: Temple

Website
- http://www.omkarhills.org/

The Sri Matsya Narayana Temple is located in Bangalore, in the state of Karnataka, India. The temple is located in Omkar Ashram, in Omkar Hills Bangalore. The temple is located in Omkar Ashram, in Omkar Hills Bangalore.

== Religious significance ==
The Sri Matsya Narayana Temple is the only temple in Karnataka dedicated to Sri Matsya Narayana Swamy. The Matsya avatara was the first incarnation of Hindu deity Vishnu among the dashavatara (ten avataras) of Vishnu. Matsya means ‘fish’ in Sanskrit and Matsya avatara is the incarnation of Vishnu in the form of a fish. At the end of the first epoch (Satya Yuga), when the world was destroyed by a great flood, Vishnu is believed to have assumed this form to save humanity and the Vedas from the great deluge.

The Matsya avatara is generally represented as a four-armed deity having the upper half of Vishnu with four arms. Two arms hold shanka (conch shell) and chakram (divine discus) and the other two arms are in abhaya (divine protection) and varada (boon) and the lower half of Matsya (fish).

== Worship and festival ==
The temple is open for darshan from 7 AM to 12.30 PM and from 4.30 PM to 8PM on Monday to Saturday and on Sundays and holidays, the temple is open for darshan from 7 AM to 8 PM.

The Matsya Narayana temple celebrates the major annual festival on Matsya Jayanti. The annual festival of Matsya Jayanti is celebrated on Chaitra Shukla Paksha Tritya (Third day of the waxing moon period of the Chaitra month (March- April)) every year.

== Gallery ==
=== Matsya Narayana temple in 2024 ===
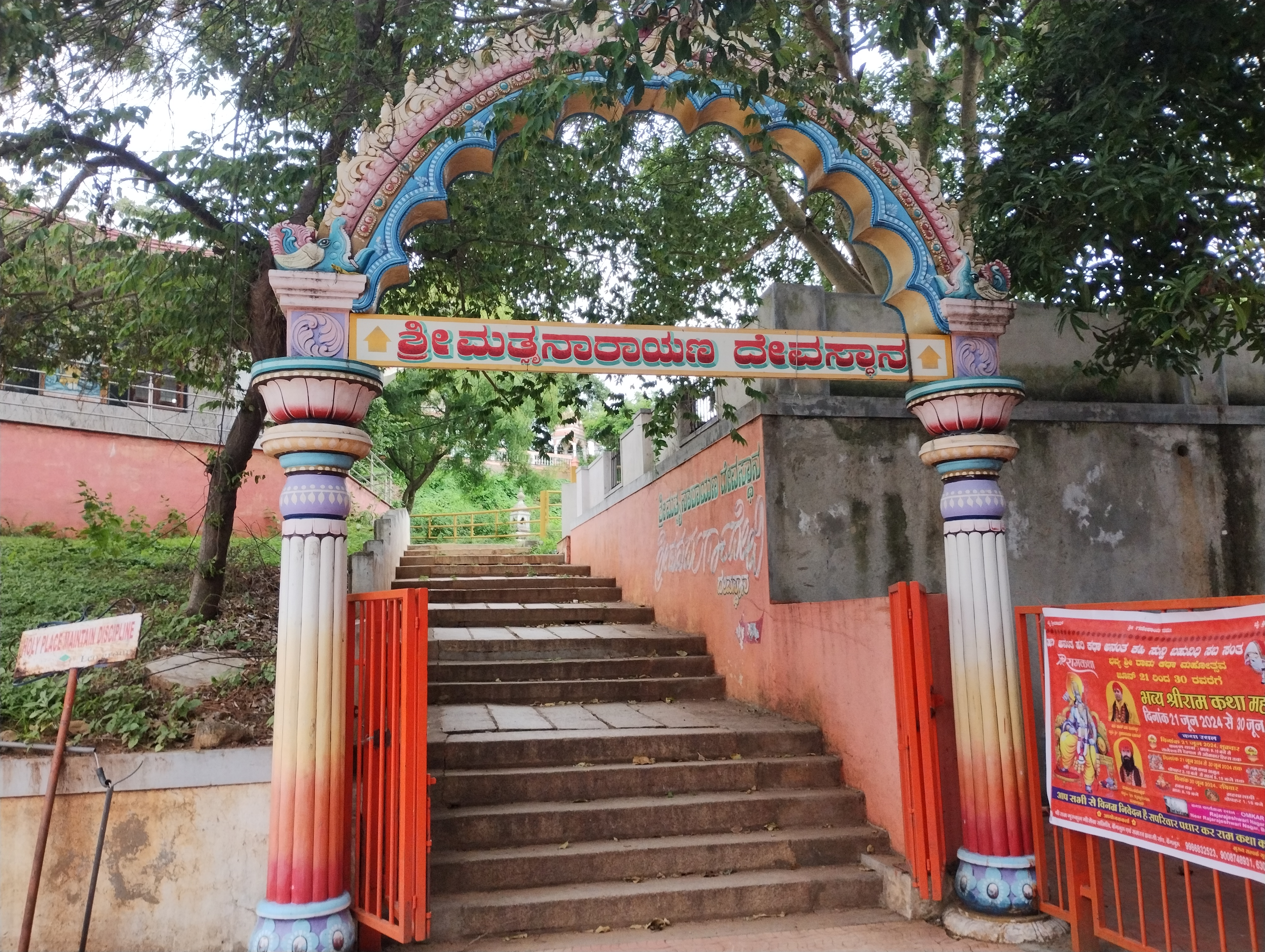

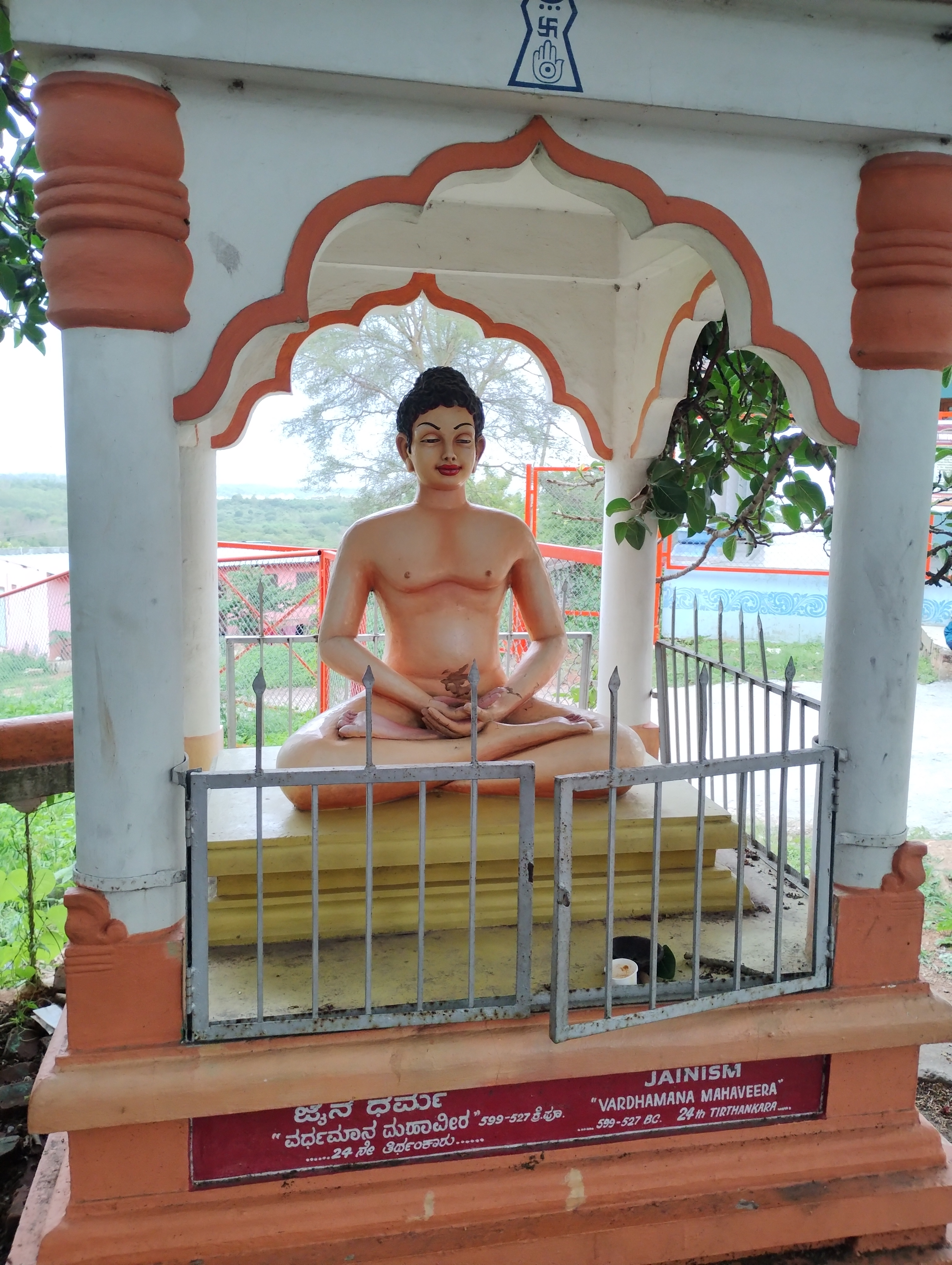

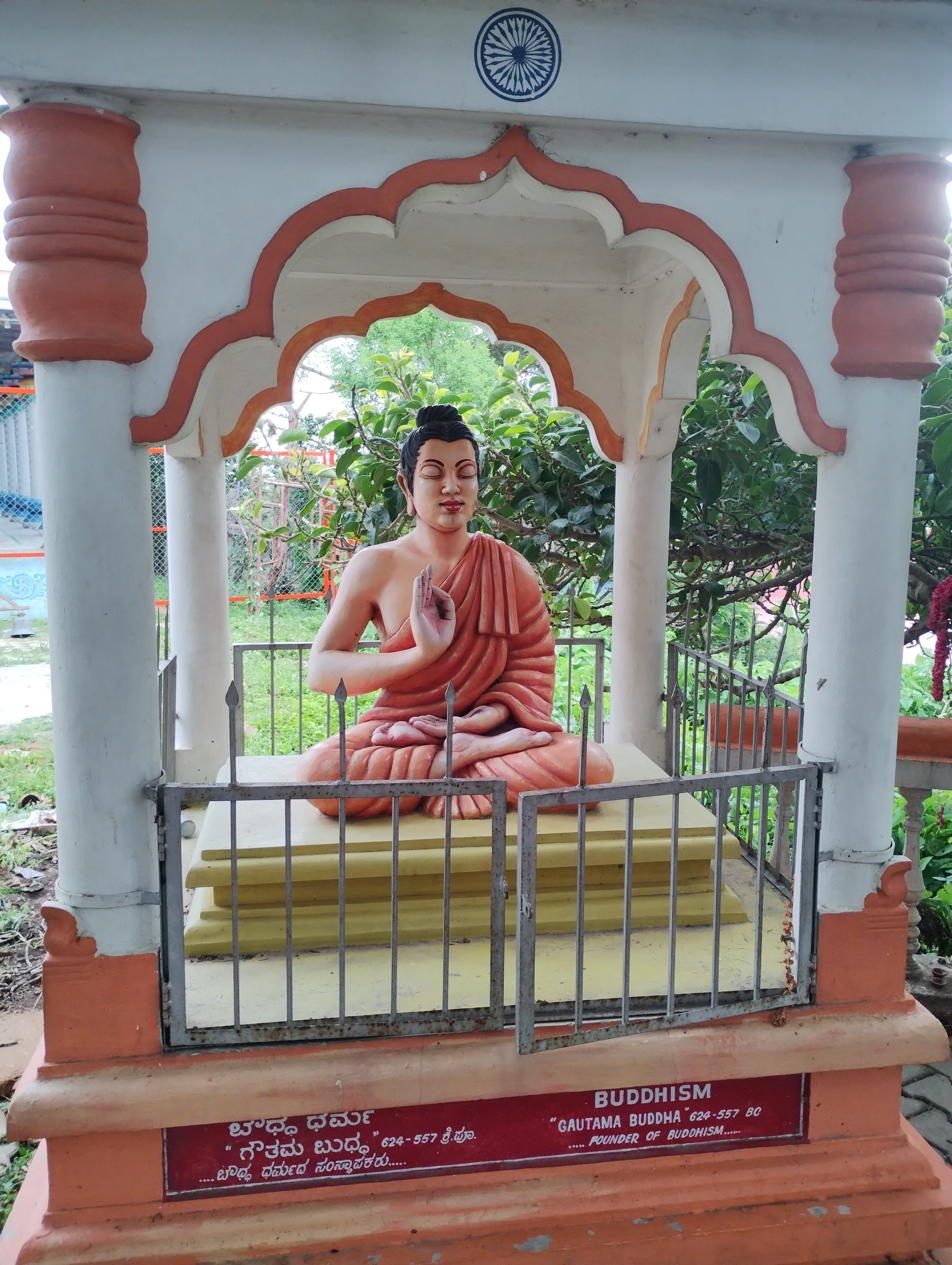

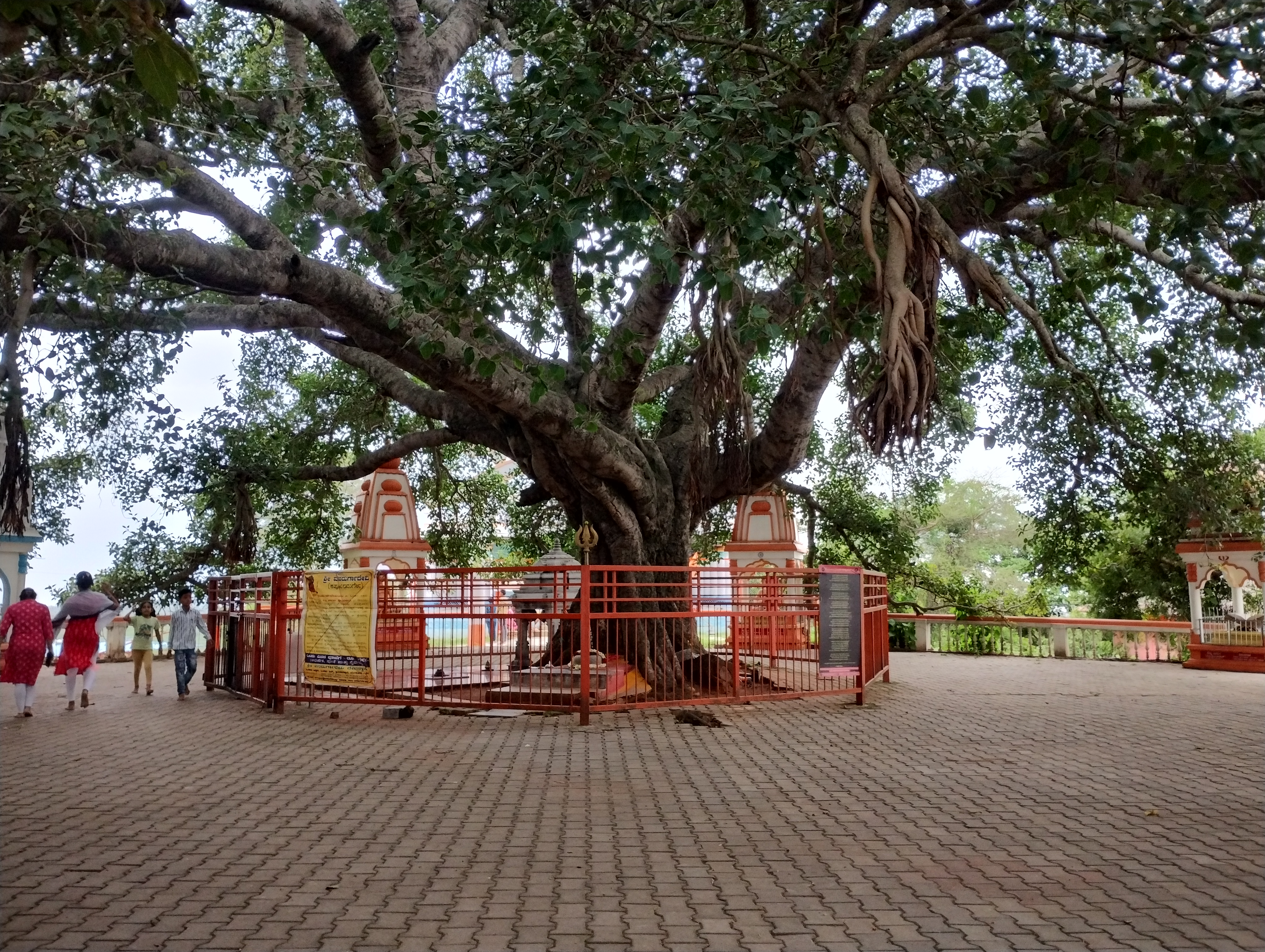

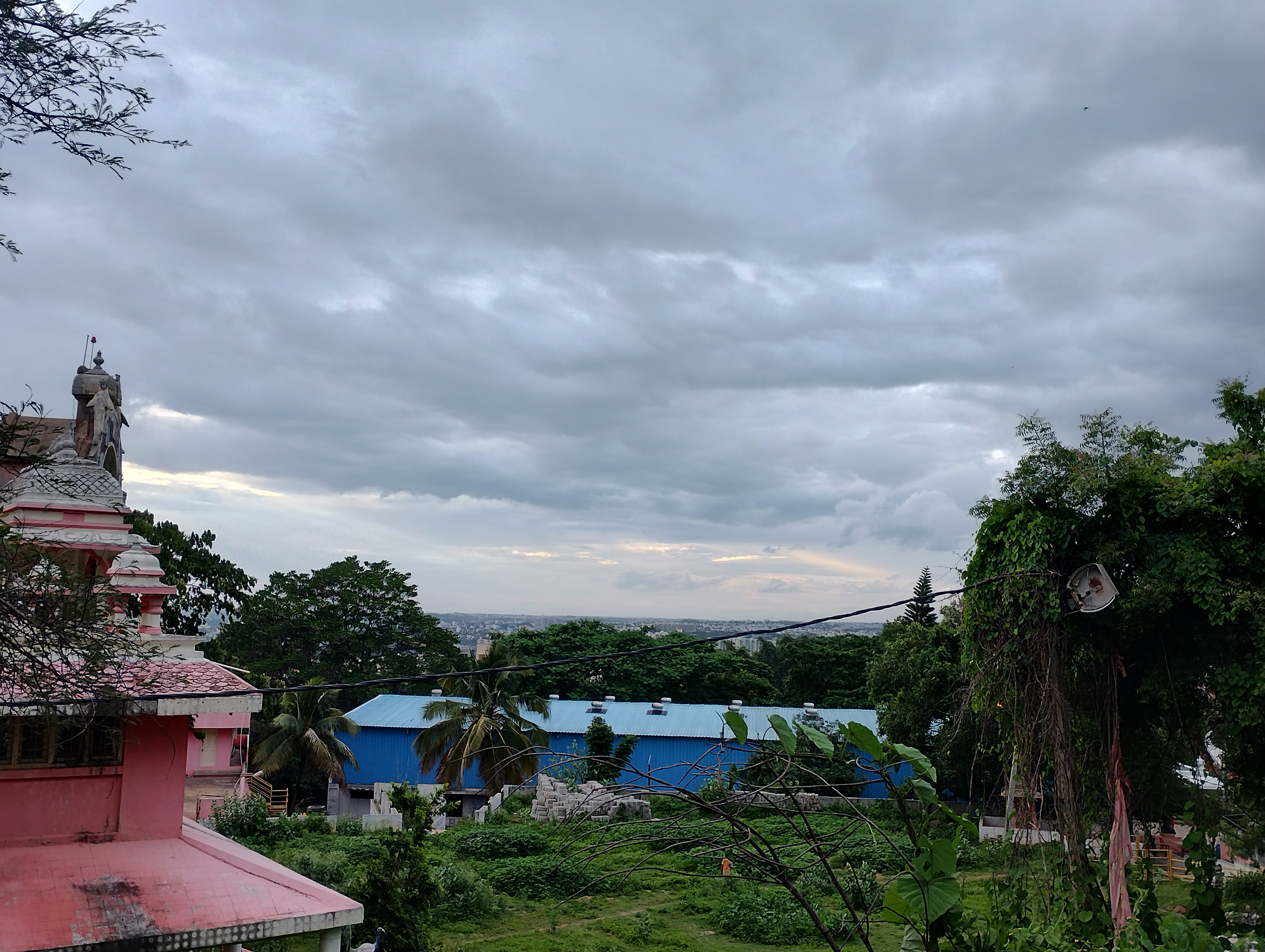
