= Nagalapuram =

- Village
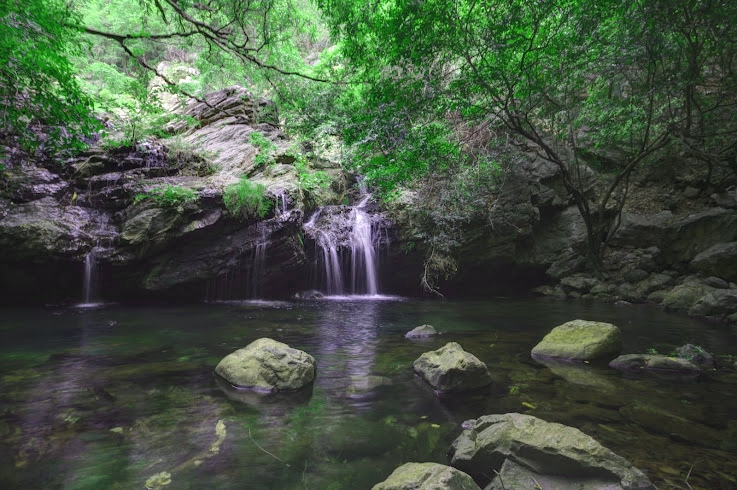
- Nagalapuram Hill Streams
- Interactive map of Nagalapuram
- Location in Andhra Pradesh, India
- Coordinates: 13.3889°N 79.7967°E
- Country: India
- State: Andhra Pradesh
- District: Tirupati
- Mandal: Nagalapuram
- Founder: Krishna Devaraya

Area
  - Total: 14.32 km^{2} (5.53 sq mi)

Population (2011)
  - Total: 11,166
  - Density: 779.7/km^{2} (2,020/sq mi)

Languages
  - Official: Telugu
- Time zone: UTC+5:30 (IST)
- Postal code: 517589

Nagalapuram is a village and headquarters of Nagalapuram mandal in Tirupati district of the Indian state of Andhra Pradesh. It is at 13.4000°N 79.7833°E, and is the site of Vedanarayana Temple.

== Gallery ==
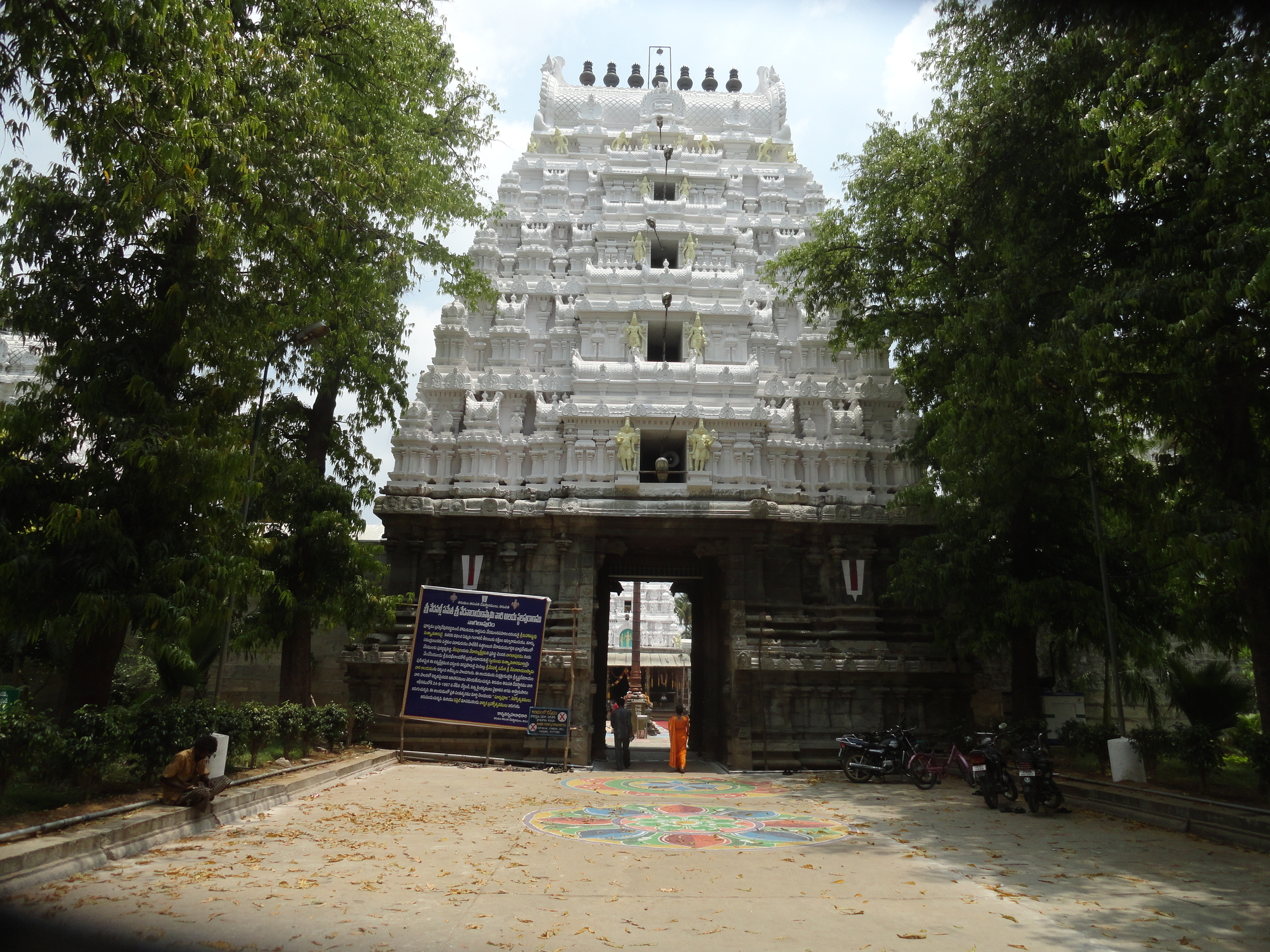
temple

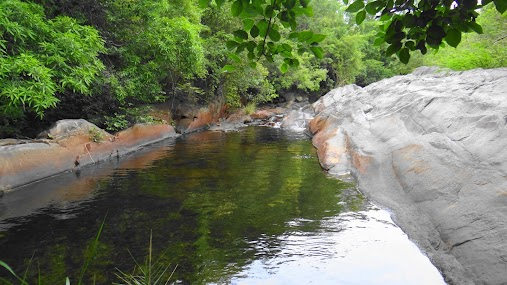
temple
