= Brazilian units of measurement =

Units of measurement used in Brazil

A number of different units of measurement were used in Brazil to measure quantities including length, area, volume, and mass as those units were derived from Portugal and had significant local variances.

In 1814 as part of the Portuguese Empire, Brazil adopted the new Portuguese metric system, which was based in the original metric system, but with its units having Portuguese traditional names. This system was not, however, widely adopted and was soon abandoned, with the Portuguese customary units continuing to be used.

In 1862 the metric system finally became compulsory in Brazil, and consolidated in 1972.

== Pre-metric units ==
A number of units were used with local variations.

=== Length ===
A number of different units were used in Brazil to measure length. One pé (foot) was equal to 0.33 m (with local variations). Some of other units are given below:

1 polegada (inch) = 1/12 pé

1 palmo (palm) = 2/3 pé

1 vara (yard) = 3 1/3 pés

1 passo geométrico (pace) = 5 pés

1 braça (fathom) = 6 2/3 pés

1 légua (league) = 20,000 pés.

=== Mass ===
A number of different units were used in Brazil to measure mass. One libra (pound) was equal to 459.05 g (with local variations). Some of other units are given below :

1 onça (ounce) = 1/16 libra

1 marco (mark) = 1/2 libra

1 arroba = 32 libras (One arroba métrica is equal to 15 kg. In Santos market Exchange, one arroba was 10 kg.)

1 quintal (hundredweight) = 128 libras

1 tonelada (ton) = 1,728 libras.

The quilate (karat) used to measure to mass of gems was equal to 3.075 grains, and the outava used to measure mass of topazes was 57.17 grains.

=== Area ===
Different units were used to measure area in Brazil, often with significant local variations. One tarefa was equal to 3,000–4,000 m^{2}. One alqueire was equal to 24,200 or 48,400 m^{2} (it was equal to 8 salamis and it was 33 L in Minas Gerais).

=== Volume ===
A number of different units with notable local variations were used in Brazil. One almude was equal to 31.944 L. One alqueire was equal to 40 to 320 L (generally for grain 33 L) (According to some sources, 1 alqueire = 5.324 L, alqueire (salt) = 4.076 L, 1 alqueire (common) = 3.626 L, 1 alqueire (Bahia) = 3.524 L, and 1 alqueire = 1/6 almude). Some of other units are provided below:

1 canada = 1/12 almude

1 moio = 10 almudes

1 pipa = 12 almudes

1 tonel = 30 almudes.

The cargueiro (mule load) consisted of two small barrels of 40 L each.

== See also ==
- Portuguese customary units
- Quebra–Quilos revolt
