= Moio (unit) =

Traditional Portuguese unit of volume with a variety of different definitions

Moio or mojo, formerly moyo, from the Latin "modius", was a metrological term used for grain and liquid in Galicia, Portugal and its colonies.

In ancient Rome, the moio ("modius") was a measure of capacity equivalent to 8.7 to 9.2 liter. Throughout the history of Portugal, moio has designated different measures, whether of capacity for solids and liquids, or for surfaces of land. As a measure of capacity, it was usually defined by a number of alqueires or almudes and divided into 4 quarteiros. The transformation of the volume measure into a surface measure (agrarian measure) occurred by determining the average area of land that could be sown with a moio of seed.

- 1 moio = 15 fangas/fanegas = 60 alqueire = 120 meios alqueires (1/2 alqueire) = 240 quartas = 480 oitavas = 960 sixteenths (half eights) = 1,920 maquias.

The moio was used in Portugal and its colonies until the first half of the 19th century. In 1852, Portugal adopted the metric system. Brazil, an independent nation since 1822, adopted the metric system in 1861.

== Portugal ==
In the 11th century, in the county of Portucale, moios with capacities in the order of magnitude of 3 to 9 Roman modii, or 26 to 83 liters, are documented. Its most common value would be perhaps 6 Roman moios. In the system of the county of Portucale, however, the moio had come to represent 64 alqueires, in other words, around 220 liters. In the system introduced by Afonso I, the definition of the moio was maintained, but given the increase in the capacity of the alqueire, the moio came to be equivalent to about 560 liters. In parallel with these main systems, there were still systems in which the mopio had a very reduced capacity, such as the salt measurement system in Aveiro, where the moio was of only 13.1 liters.

Under the reign of Pedro I of Portugal, due to a new increase in the capacity of the legal alqueire, the moio came to be equivalent to about 630 liters. In the system of Manuel I, the moio came to represent the number of 60 alqueires of Lisbon (each alqueire was 13.1 liters), which resulted in a value of about 790 liters.

Despite the efforts of the successive monarchs to standardize, the value of the moio continued to vary from region to region - although to a lesser extent than in the Middle Ages - according to the value of the alqueire. As a unit of volume, the moio is now obsolete.

- 1 moio = 40.858,2549 Parisian cubic inches = 810.48 liters (Portugal, general)
- 1 Lisbonese Moio = 830.46 Liter (Alqueire = 13.841 liters

In Porto, an Oportan alqueire equalled to 830 Parisian cubic inches and 16.462 litres

- 1 moio = 60 alqueires (Oporto) = 49.800 Parisian cubic inches = 987.852 litres

Considering the goods, there were measurements for them:

- Raw lime: 1 moio = 30 alqueiras = 405.24 litre = ½ Getreide-Moio
- Calcium hydroxide: 50 alqueiras = 675.4 litre

== Brazil ==
In Rio de Janeiro, an alqueiro equaled to 13.5 liters and 681 Parisian cubic inches

- 1 Moio = 40.860 Parisian cubic inches = 810.5146 liters

== Cape Verde ==
- 1 Moio = 52 Alqueiras (the measurement that equalled to the one in Rio de Janeiro)

== Bibliography ==
- NOBACK, Christian, and Friedrich Eduard NOBACK (1851) Vollständiges Taschenbuch der Münz-, Maß- und Gewichtsverhältnisse. volume 1, 2, F. A. Brockhaus, Leipzig 1851.
- SEABRA LOPES, L. "As Antigas Medidas do Sal de Aveiro". Boletim Municipal de Cultura, Ano XVIII, nº 36, Câmara Municipal de Aveiro, 2000, p. 59-73.
- SEABRA LOPES, L. "Sistemas Legais de Medidas de Peso e Capacidade, do Condado Portucalense ao Século XVI", Portugalia: Nova Série, XXIV, 2003, Faculdade de Letras, Porto, p. 113-164.
- SEABRA LOPES, L. "O Moio-medida e o Moio dos Preços em Portugal nos Séculos XI a XIII". Anuario de Estudios Medievales, vol. 35 (1), Consejo Superior de Investigaciones Cientificas, Barcelona, 2005, p. 25-46.
- WACH, Anton (1863) Gemeinnütziger Bauratgeber bei allen Arbeits- und Materialberechnungen im Baufach. Friedrich Lempsky, Prague 1863.

== See also ==
- Moy (salt)
- Portuguese customary units
