= Thomas Bohier =

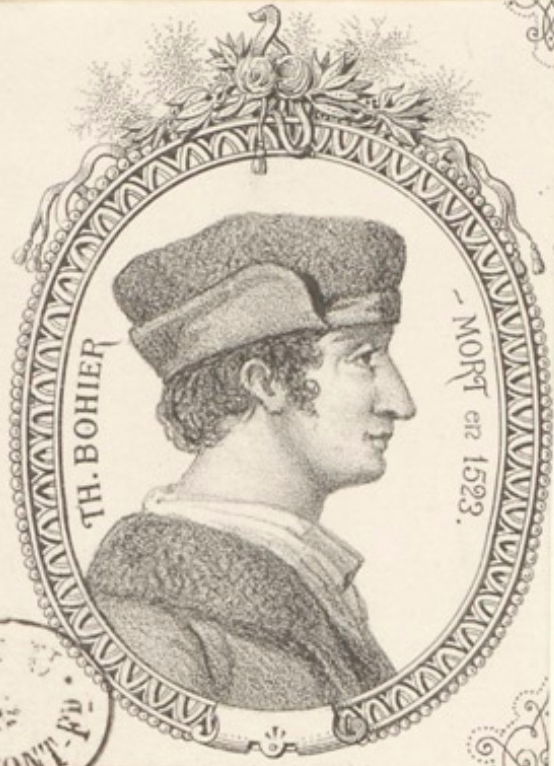

Thomas Bohier (c. 1460 - 24 March 1523) was a French politician. From 1513 onwards he built the château de Chenonceau, with his wife Katherine Briçonnet supervising its construction. His eldest son was Antoine II Bohier.

== Life ==
=== Career ===
Born in Issoire, Thomas Bohier served Louis XI, Charles VIII, Louis XII, and Francis I. A notary and master of the accounts in Paris, he was made king's secretary to Charles in 1491 and finance secretary in Grenoble three years later and général des Finances for Normandy un 1497. He oversaw construction of the hôtel des Finances de Rouen in 1508.

In 1497 he was elected mayor of Tours, though the peak of his career was becoming lieutenant-general to the king and treasurer-general during the Italian Wars, dying encamped at Vigelli in the Milanais in 1523.

=== Chenonceau ===
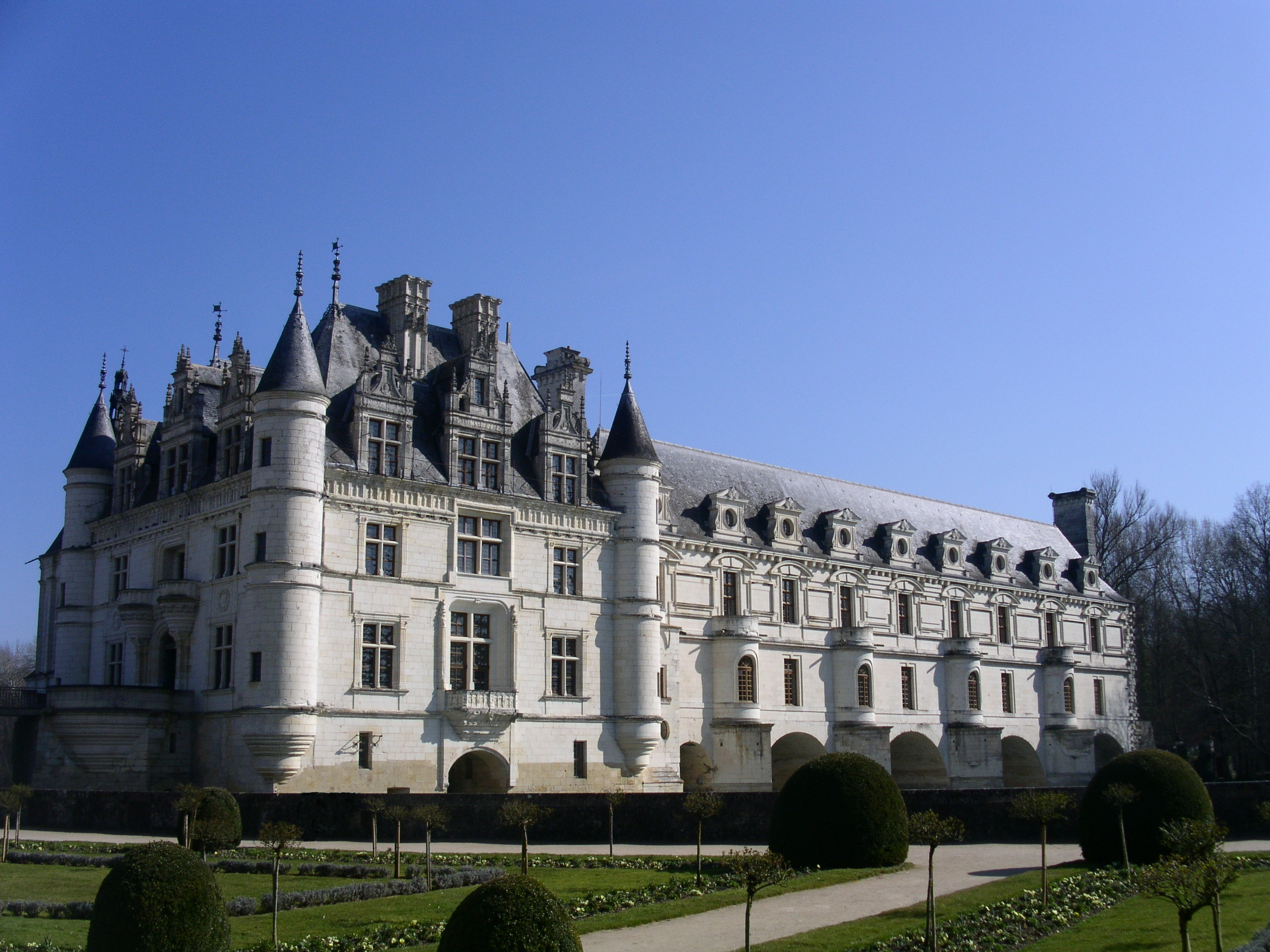
Château de Chenonceau.

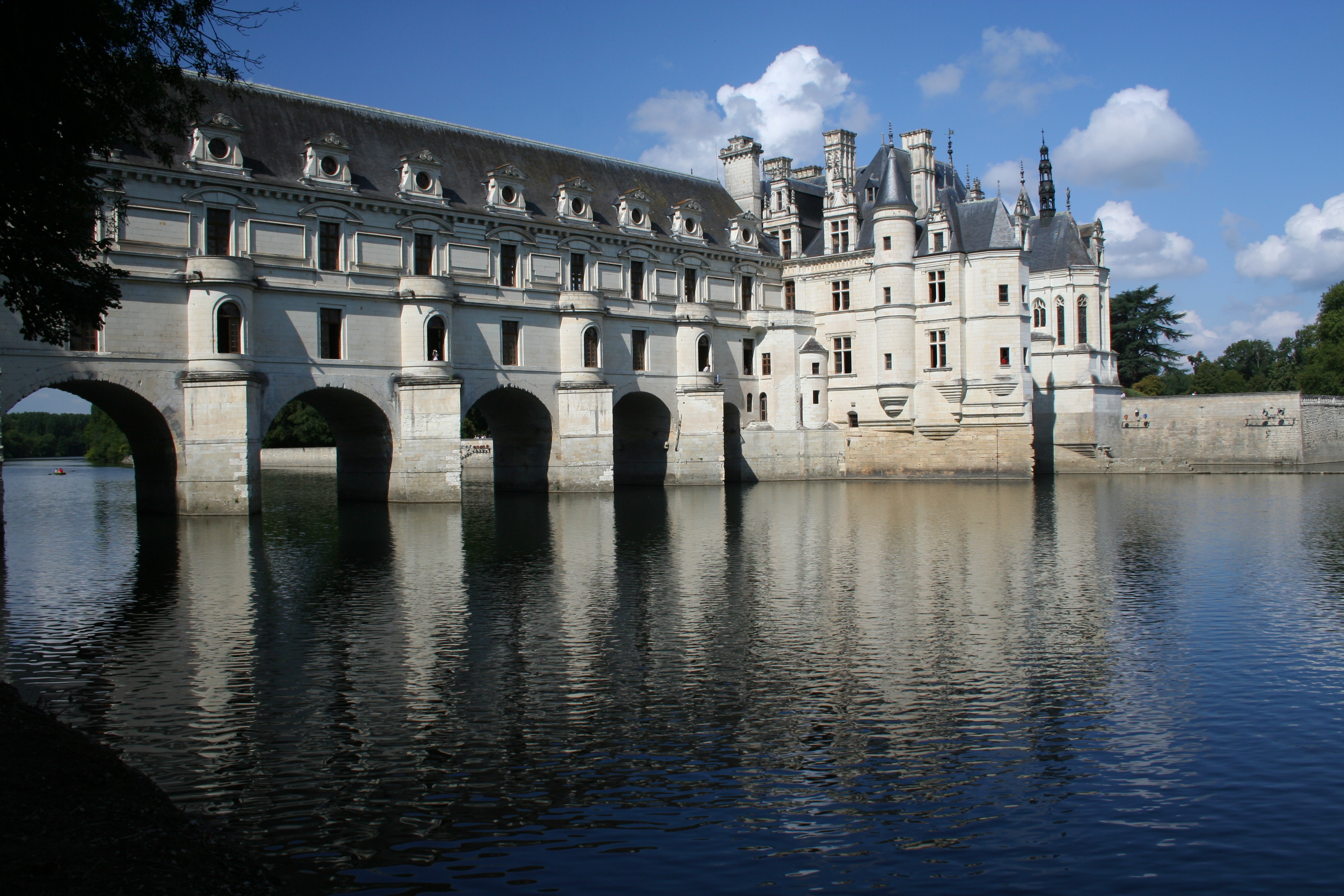
Château de Chenonceau beside the Cher.

Bohier coveted the Chenonceaux estate and the ruin of the Marques family's ruined building. Via Jacques de Beaune he surreptitiously bought various lands dependent on Chenonceau and various rentcharges on that land to force Pierre Marques to sell him his main estate by requiring regular payments.

Jacques de Beaune thus bought :

- On 10 December 1797, les Houdes and 20 livres of annuities of Jean de Hodon (son of Adam) for 821 écus d’or, 18 sols and 9 deniers;
- From Foulques Marques, 50 livres of annuities;
- From Jean Quetier, a merchant, 42 livres of annuities
- From Pierre Imbert, an muid of wheat;
- From Michel Pellé, 10 livres;
- From Jean du Fau, squire, 100 livres;
- From Macé Papillon, 30 livres;
- From Pierre and Foulques Marques, 100 livres.

=== Death ===
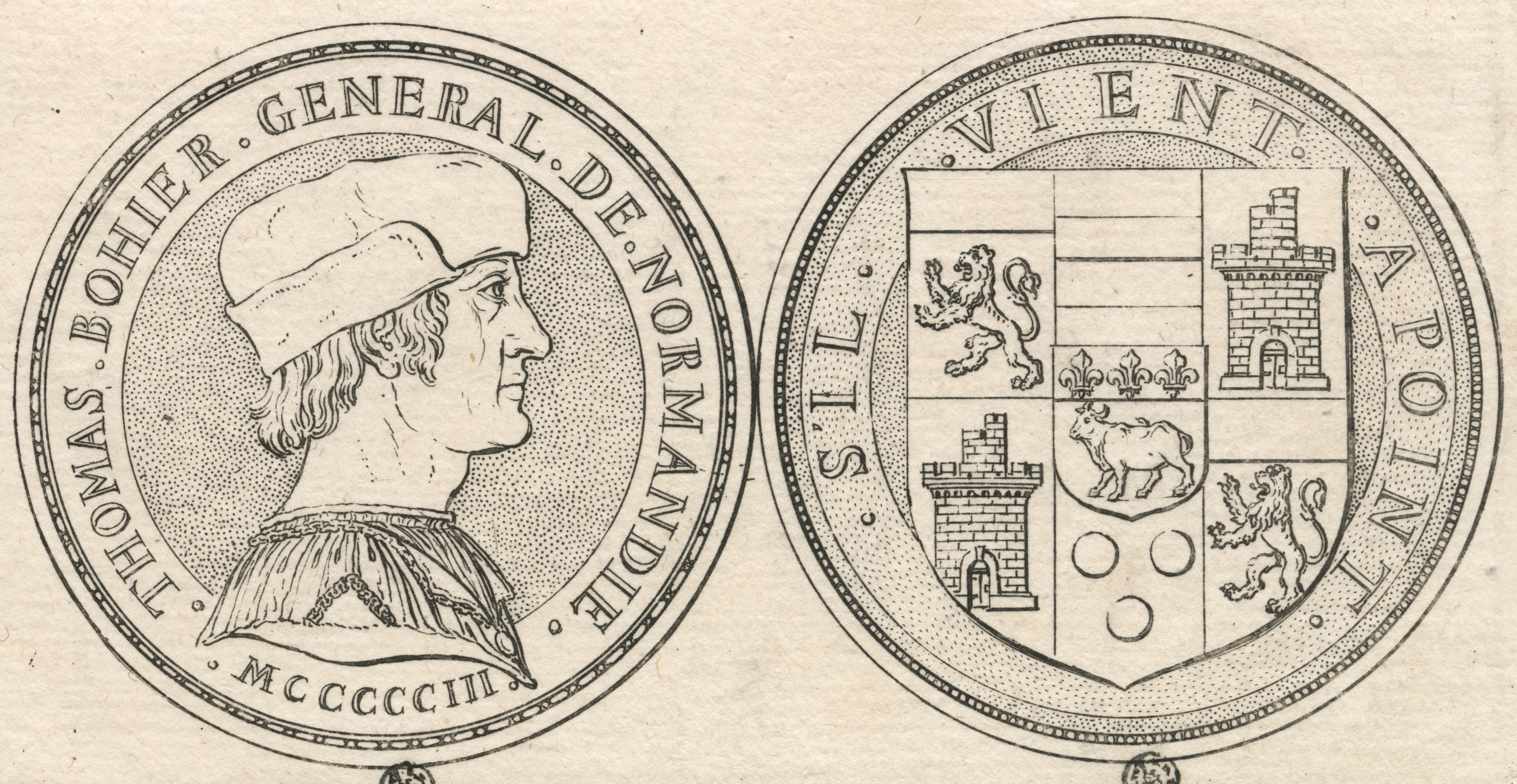
Medal for Thomas Bohier.

His body was returned to Touraine, where he was buried in Saint-Saturnin church in Tours. His wife was buried beside him three years later.

== Titles ==
- Baron of Saint-Cirgues
- Lord of:
  - Chenaie
  - Chenonceau
  - Tour-Bohier
  - Nazelles
  - Le Coudray

== Bibliography ==
- (in French) "M. E. Aubry-Vitet, « Chenonceau », dans Revue des deux mondes, no. 69 (1867)".
