= Almude =

The almude is an obsolete Portuguese unit of measurement of volume used in Portugal, Brazil and other parts of the Portuguese Empire.

Etymologically, it derives from the Arabic al-mudd, and ultimately from Latin modius. The almude appears in Portuguese documents since the first half of the 11th century. As in the Iberian regions under Arab rule, its capacity was in the Christian northwest 0.7 liters. In the system of the county of Portucale, the almude was equivalent to 2 alqueires (about 6.7 liters). In the system introduced by Afonso Henriques, first king of Portugal, and used almost until the end of the first dynasty, it seems that the almude was equivalent to the alqueire of that system (8.7 liters). In the system introduced by Pedro I, the almude was again equivalent to 2 alqueires (about 19.7 liters). In the Lisbon system, adapted and generalized to the whole kingdom by Manuel I, the almude was equivalent to about 16.8 liters.

In modern times, the official almude was therefore 16.8 liters. However, in different regions of Portugal, the de facto almude could reach the equivalent of two alqueires. In addition, there could be different almudes for different liquids.

Some examples were:

- Portugal (modern standard): 16.8 liters
- Faro: 17.04 liters.
- Madeira: 17.72 liters.
- Porto: 25.08 liters.
- Viana do Castelo: 24.60 liters.

An almude was often divided in 2 potes or 12 canadas. In Spain, the unit was called almud and it was much smaller.

== See also ==
- Portuguese customary units

== Literature ==
- Monteverde, Emilio Achilles (1861) Manual Encyclopedico para Uzo das Escolas de Instrucção Primaria, Lisbon: Imprensa Nacional.
- Seabra Lopes, L. (2000) «Medidas Portuguesas de Capacidade: duas Tradições Metrológicas em Confronto Durante a Idade Média», Revista Portuguesa de História, 34, p. 535-632.
- Seabra Lopes, L. (2003) «Sistemas Legais de Medidas de Peso e Capacidade, do Condado Portucalense ao Século XVI», Portugalia, Nova Série, XXIV, Faculdade de Letras, Porto, p. 113-164.
- Seabra Lopes, L. (2003) «Medidas de Capacidade na Beira nos Séculos XII a XVI», Beira Alta, vol. 62 (1-2), Assembleia Distrital de Viseu, p. 109-141.
- Seabra Lopes, L. (2018) «O Regimento de Pesos e Medidas nos Reinados de Dom Afonso V e Dom João II», Boletim da Sociedade de Geografia de Lisboa, 136, p. 143-168.
