= Katherine Briçonnet =

French noblewoman

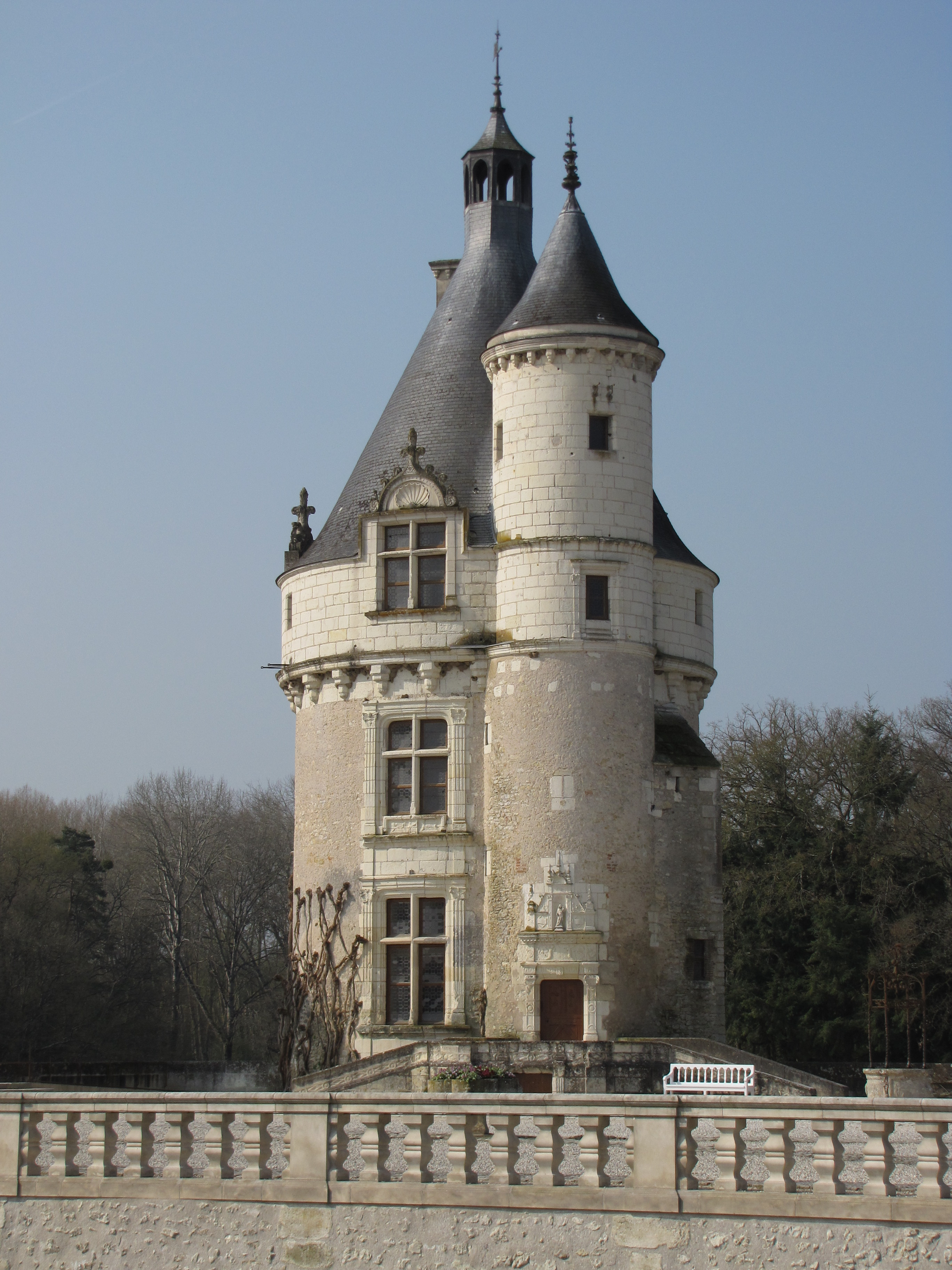
The Chenonceau tower completed under Katherine Briçonnet

Katherine Briçonnet (French pronunciation: [katʁin bʁisɔnɛ]; c. 1494 – November 3, 1526) was a French noblewoman, daughter of Raoulette de Beaune and Guillaume Briçonnet and wife of Thomas Bohier.

She was influential in designing the Château de Chenonceau. Her husband had purchased the site which contained the ruins of an earlier fortress as he wished to build a Renaissance château there. It was Katherine who supervised the construction work between 1513 and 1521, taking important architectural decisions while her husband was away fighting in the Italian wars.

In particular, she oversaw the construction of the practically designed staircase which proceeds straight upwards rather than in a spiral as was usual at the time in fortresses for defensive reasons. In 1524, shortly after the building had been completed, Thomas Bohier died. Katherine died two years later. The initials TBK (Thomas Bohier [and] Katherine) can still be seen as well as a motto carved on the door: "S'il vient à point, me souviendra" (If I manage to build Chenonceau, I will be remembered).

The original part of the château completed under Katherine Briçonnet is known as the Château des Dames as it was later extended by Diane de Poitiers and Catherine de Médicis.

== See also ==
- Women in architecture
