= Alqueire =

Alqueire is a traditional unit of measurement in Portuguese. The term has been documented in Portugal since the 12th century. It is derived from the Arabic word أَكْيَال (al-kayl), which roughly means 'measure'. It was originally used to measure the amount of dry goods (such as grain) a pack animal could carry, in the form of satchels or baskets. In Portugal, the alqueire was used as a measure of capacity and eventually it was used also as a measure of area of productive land. The spread of Portuguese culture took both meanings of the word to different parts of the world.

== Usage in Portugal ==
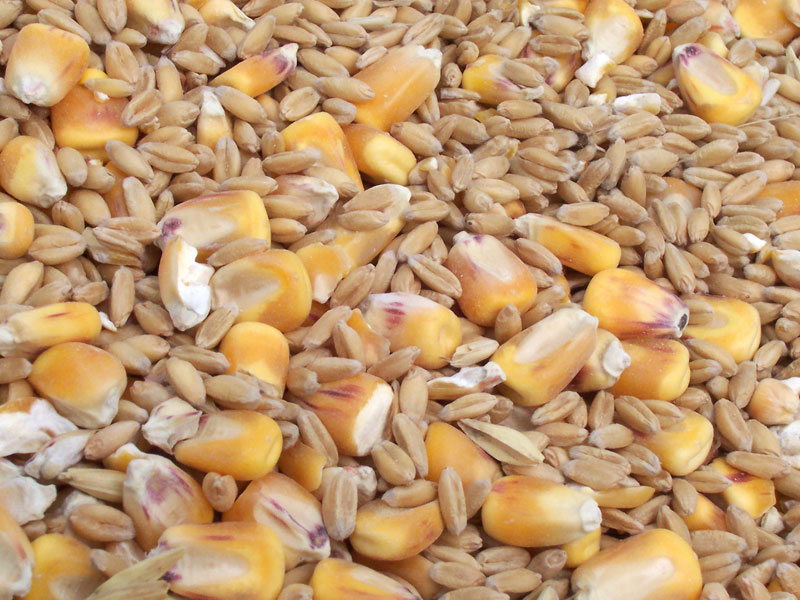
The alqueire was a measure of capacity primarily used for grains

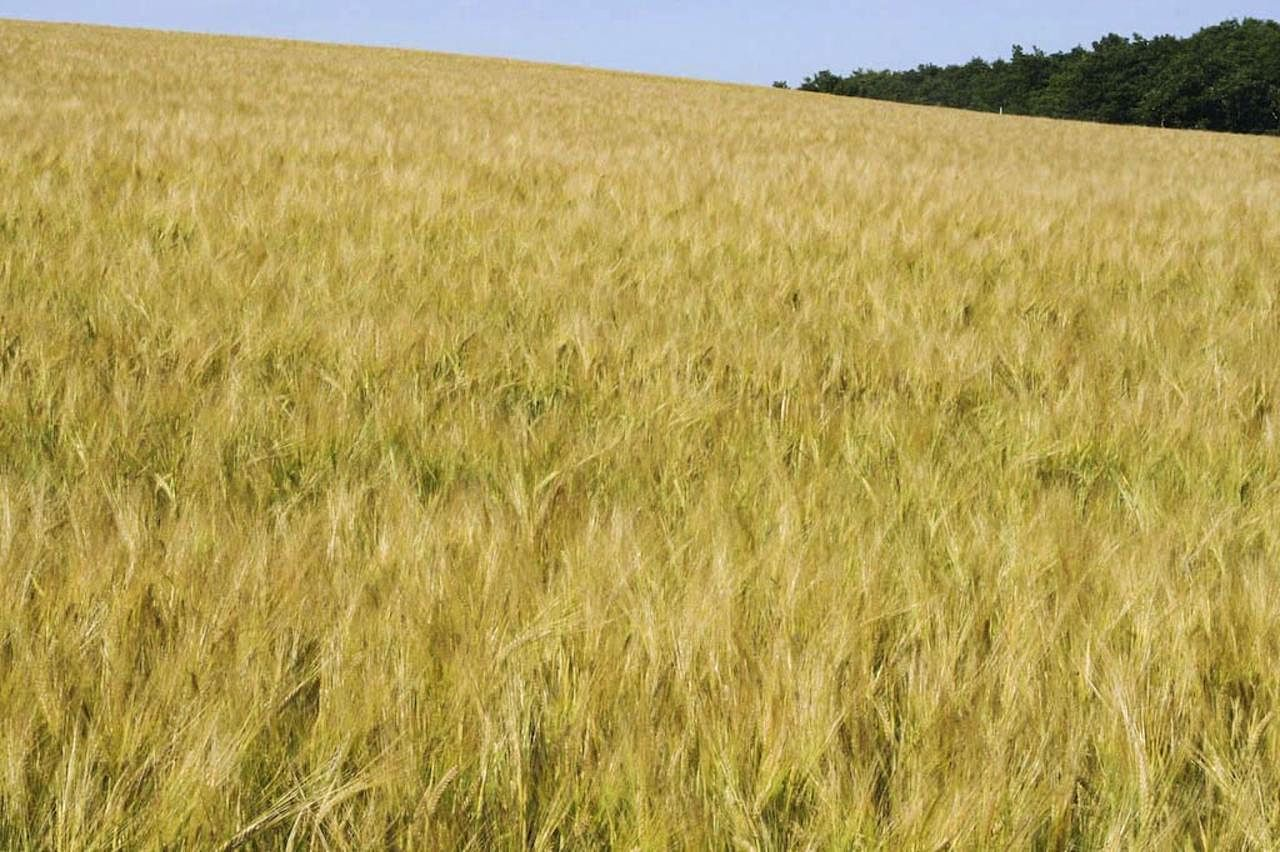
With time, alqueire also began to refer to the area of land that could be sown with an alqueire of grain

The Arabic al-kayl, used in areas of the Iberian Peninsula under Arab rule, was imported to northern Portugal around the time of the Portuguese County, where it became known as alqueire. The first explicit reference dates from 1111, but the alqueire was already in use in the late 11th century. It was likely that the term alqueire designated a single well-known measure in the Portuguese County. In 1145, the municipal ordinances of Coimbra stipulated that the alqueire (of cereal) should have a weight of 6.5 arráteis, and thus a capacity for around 3.4 liters. This suggests that other alqueires were entering common usage alongside the standard definition.

Throughout most of the first dynasty, reigns of Afonso Henriques to Afonso IV, the legal alqueire was equivalent to the Roman modius, i.e. about 8.7 liters. However, the legal alqueire was not used throughout the whole country. King Pedro I (1357) introduced a new alqueire of 9.8 liters and tried to impose it as a standard for the whole kingdom. This alqueire in fact had a wider spread than the previous one, but failed to generalize to the entire territory. With Manuel I (1499), the alqueire of Lisbon, which amounted to 13.1 liters, became the standard for the kingdom. Sebastião I (1575) distributed copies of this standard, in bronze, to the main towns of the kingdom. However, regional standards still survived. Later, probably following the 1755 earthquake, the capacity of the alqueire of Lisbon was adjusted to 13.9 liters, which would allow easier conversion to the Spanish system.

The main standards used in different regions of Portugal in the nineteenth century were as follows:

- 13.1 liters on the coast between Lisbon and Aveiro
- 13.9 liters, all over the country
- 14.9 and 15.7 liters, especially in the interior and south
- 17.0, 17.5 and 19.3 liters, almost exclusively in the Entre-Douro-e-Minho

At the local level, a multitude of variants of these major patterns were in actual use. Despite the introduction of the metric system in the nineteenth century, traditional alqueires continued to be used.

Since the Middle Ages, the term alqueire also designated units of measure of area of land. Typically, an area alqueire was the area of land that could be sown with an alqueire of seed.

=== Azores ===
Even until the 20th century, in conversations with local Azorean seniors, many would refer to both meanings of alqueire: "minha terra produziu 40 alqueires de milho por alqueire de terra" (my land produced 40 alqueires of corn per alqueire of land). In the Azores, lands were distributed to the settlers who explored and expanded the territory; the Crown provided guarantees that who could explore and expand Portuguese patrimony would benefit from their largesse. It was in the moio and alqueire that many of the rural property-owners obtained their honorific titles.

== Usage in Brazil ==
During the Portuguese discoveries, the settlers of Brazil adopted both the capacity alqueire and the area alqueire. The area alqueire, with variations propagating throughout their territory, is still widely used:

alqueire paulista	2.42 hectares
alqueire mineiro or goiano	4.84 hectares
alqueire baiano	9.69 hectares
alqueire do norte	2.72 hectares

== Bibliography ==
- Seabra Lopes, L. (1998) «Medidas Portuguesas de Capacidade: do Alqueire de Coimbra de 1111 ao Sistema de Medidas de Dom Manuel», Revista Portuguesa de História, 32, p. 543-583.
- Seabra Lopes, L. (2000) «Medidas Portuguesas de Capacidade: duas Tradições Metrológicas em Confronto Durante a Idade Média», Revista Portuguesa de História, 34, p. 535-632.
- Seabra Lopes, L. (2003) «Medidas Portuguesas de Capacidade: Origem e Difusão dos Alqueires usados até ao Século XIX», Revista Portuguesa de História, vol. 36 (2), p. 345-360.
- Seabra Lopes, L. (2003) «Sistemas Legais de Medidas de Peso e Capacidade, do Condado Portucalense ao Século XVI», Portugalia, Nova Série, XXIV, Faculdade de Letras, Porto, p. 113-164.

== See also ==
- Portuguese customary units
