= Château de Chenonceau =

Castle spanning the River Cher in France

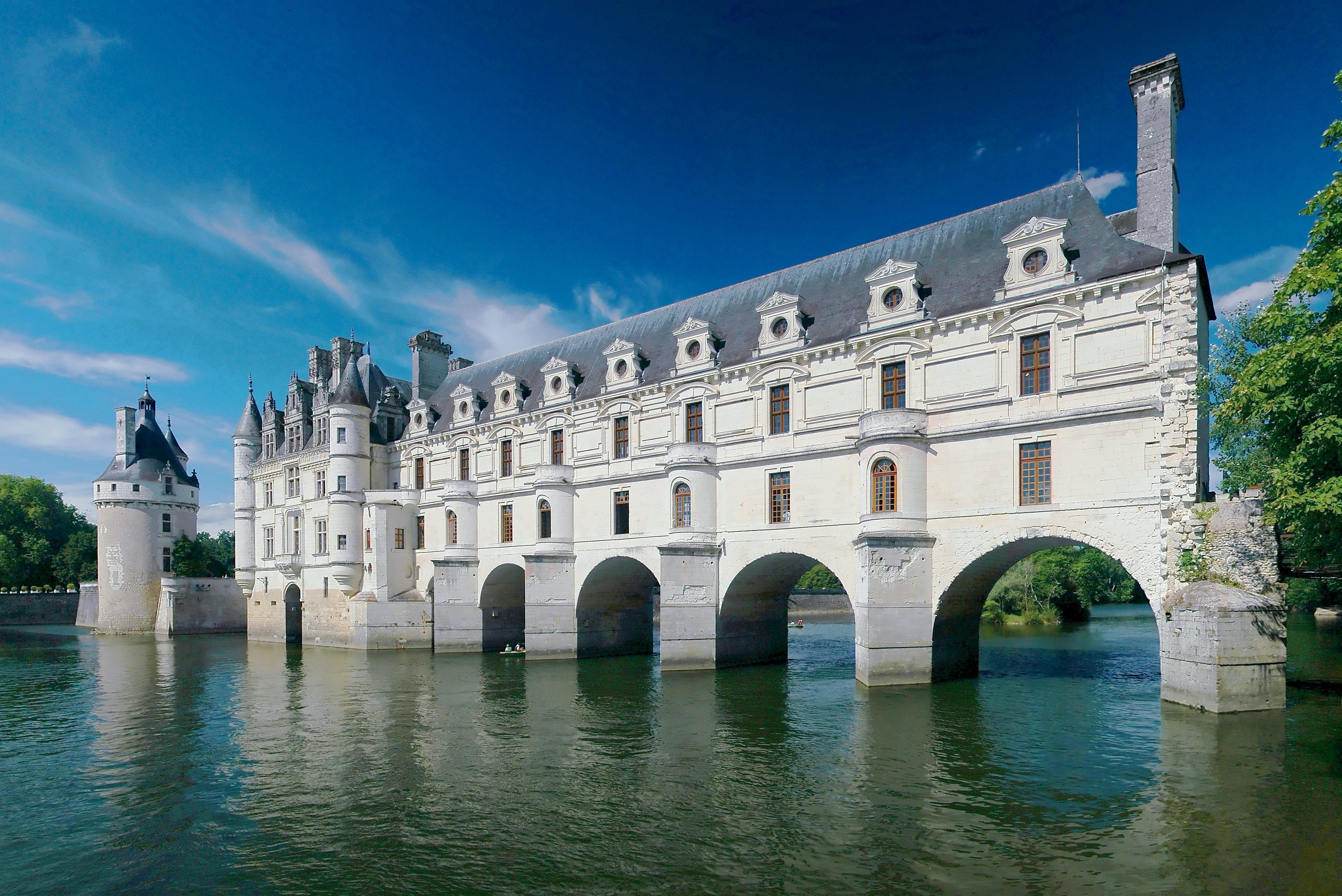
- The Château de Chenonceau, on the river Cher

- Location within France

General information
- Location: Chenonceaux, Indre-et-Loire, France
- Coordinates: 47°19′29″N 1°04′13″E

The Château de Chenonceau (French: [ʃɑto də ʃənɔ̃so]) is a French château spanning the river Cher, near the small village of Chenonceaux, Indre-et-Loire, Centre-Val de Loire. It is one of the best-known châteaux of the Loire Valley.

The estate of Chenonceau is first mentioned in writing in the 11th century. The current château was built in 1514–1522 on the foundations of an old mill and was later extended to span the river. The bridge over the river was built (1556–1559) to designs by the French Renaissance architect Philibert de l'Orme, and the gallery on the bridge, built from 1570 to 1576 to designs by Jean Bullant.

== Description ==
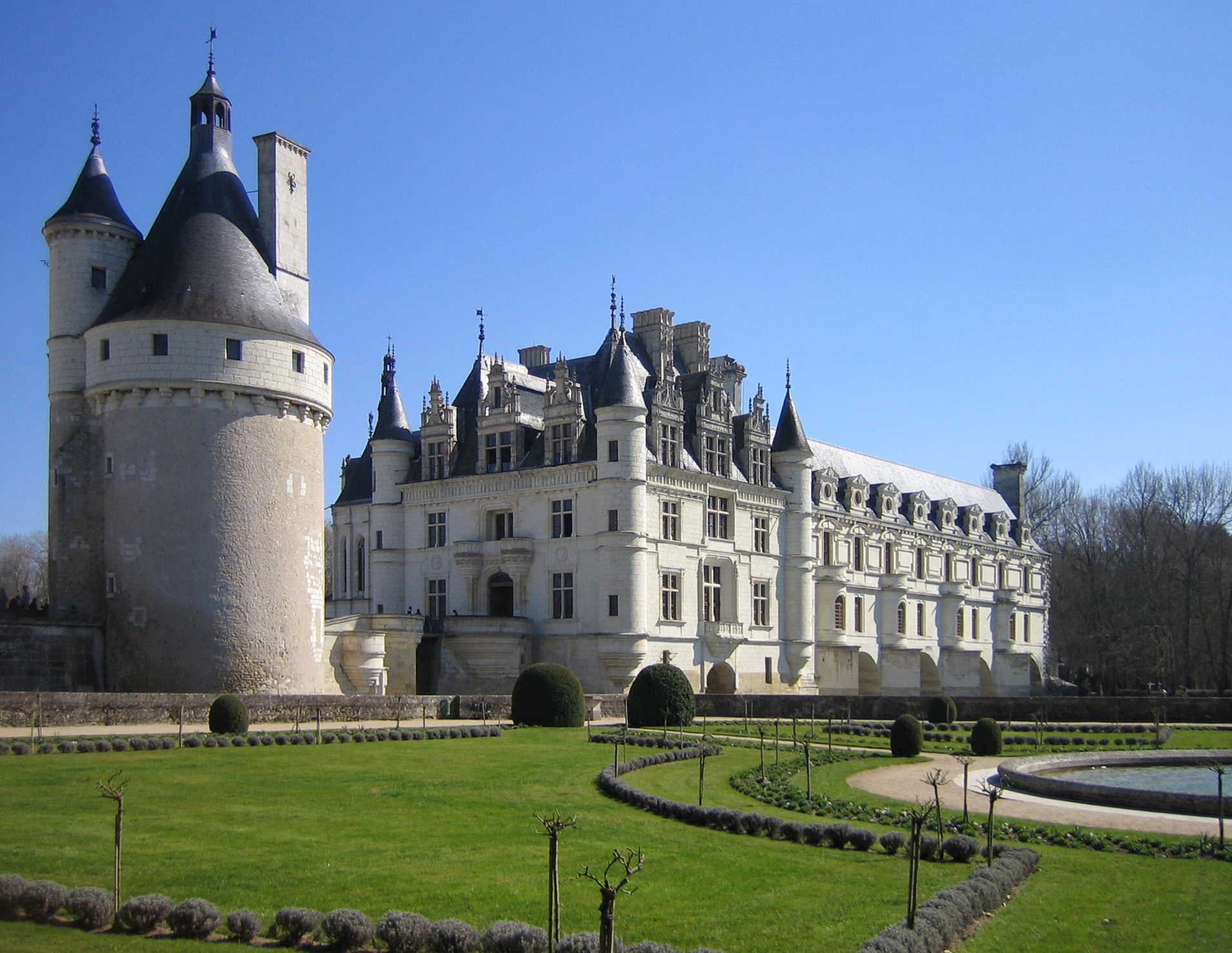
View of the château from the edge of the formal gardens to the west of the residence. The medieval keep to the left is the last vestige of the previous château, located in what is now the forecourt, still surrounded by moats.

An architectural mixture of late Gothic and early Renaissance, Château de Chenonceau and its gardens are open to the public. Other than the Royal Palace of Versailles, it is the most visited château in France.

The château has been designated as a Monument historique since 1840 by the French Ministry of Culture. Today, Chenonceau is a major tourist attraction and in 2007 received around 800,000 visitors.

== History ==
=== The Marques family ===
In the 13th century, the fief of Chenonceau belonged to the Marques family. The original château was torched in 1412 to punish the owner, Jean Marques, for an act of sedition. He rebuilt a château and fortified mill on the site in the 1430s. Jean Marques' indebted heir Pierre Marques found it necessary to sell.

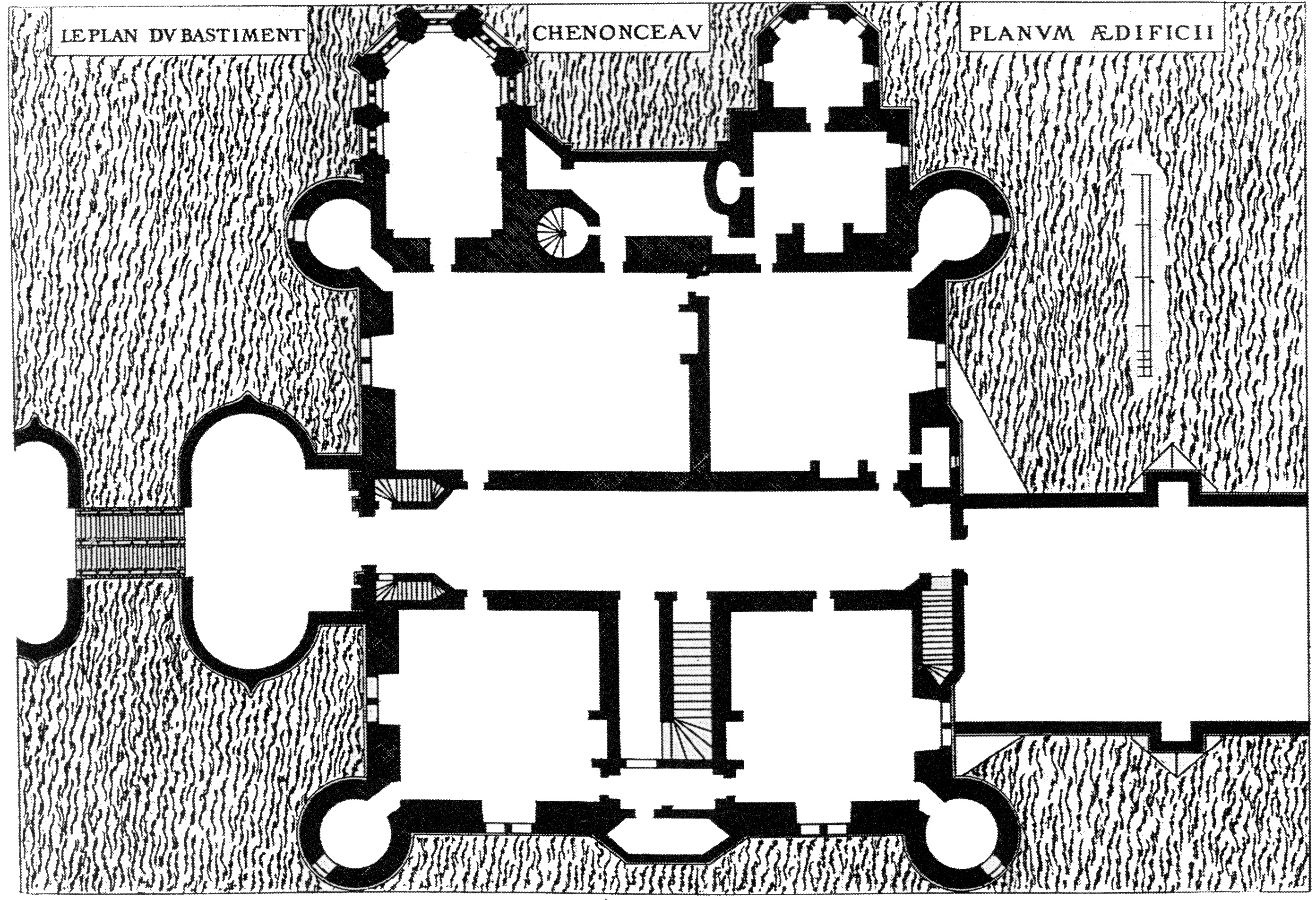
Plan of the main block, engraved by Du Cerceau (1579)

=== Thomas Bohier ===
Thomas Bohier, Chamberlain to King Charles VIII of France, purchased the castle from Pierre Marques in 1513 and demolished most of it (resulting in 2013 being considered the 500th anniversary of the castle: MDXIII–MMXIII), though its 15th-century keep was left standing. Bohier built an entirely new residence between 1515 and 1521. The work was overseen by his wife Katherine Briçonnet, who delighted in hosting French nobility, including King Francis I on two occasions.

=== Diane de Poitiers ===
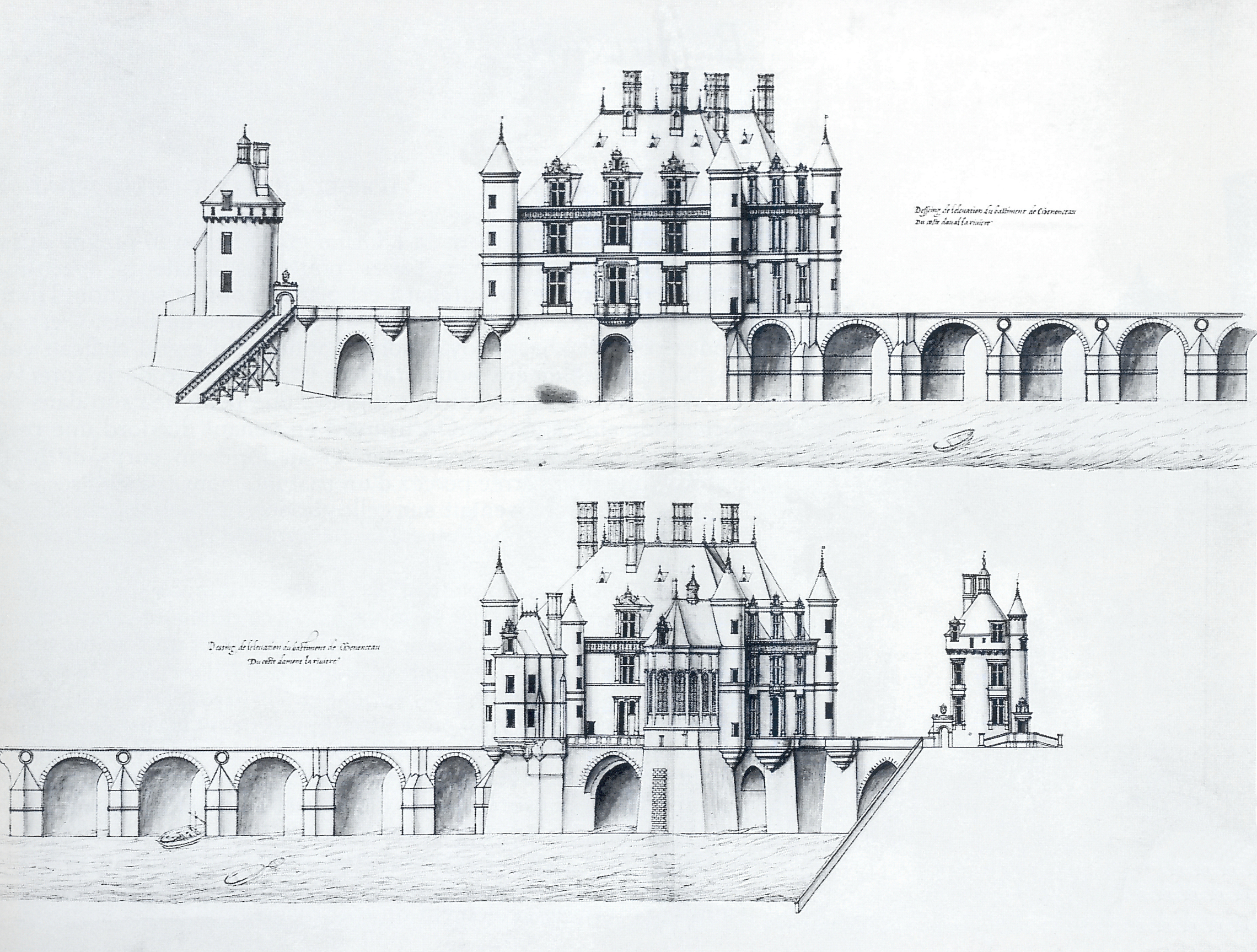
The château with de l'Orme's bridge, before the addition of the gallery: views from the west (top) and east (bottom), drawn by Jacques Androuet du Cerceau c. 1570

In 1535 the château was seized from Bohier's son by King Francis I of France for unpaid debts to the Crown. After Francis' death in 1547, Henry II offered the château as a gift to his mistress, Diane de Poitiers, who became fervently attached to the château along the river. In 1555 she commissioned Philibert de l'Orme to build the arched bridge joining the château to its opposite bank. Diane then oversaw the planting of extensive flower and vegetable gardens along with a variety of fruit trees. Set along the banks of the river, but buttressed from flooding by stone terraces, the exquisite gardens were laid out in four triangles.

Diane de Poitiers was the unquestioned mistress of the castle, but ownership remained with the crown until 1555 when years of delicate legal manoeuvres finally yielded possession to her.

=== Catherine de' Medici ===
After King Henry II died in 1559, his strong-willed widow and regent Catherine de' Medici forced Diane to exchange it for the Château Chaumont. Queen Catherine then made Chenonceau her own favourite residence, adding a new series of gardens.

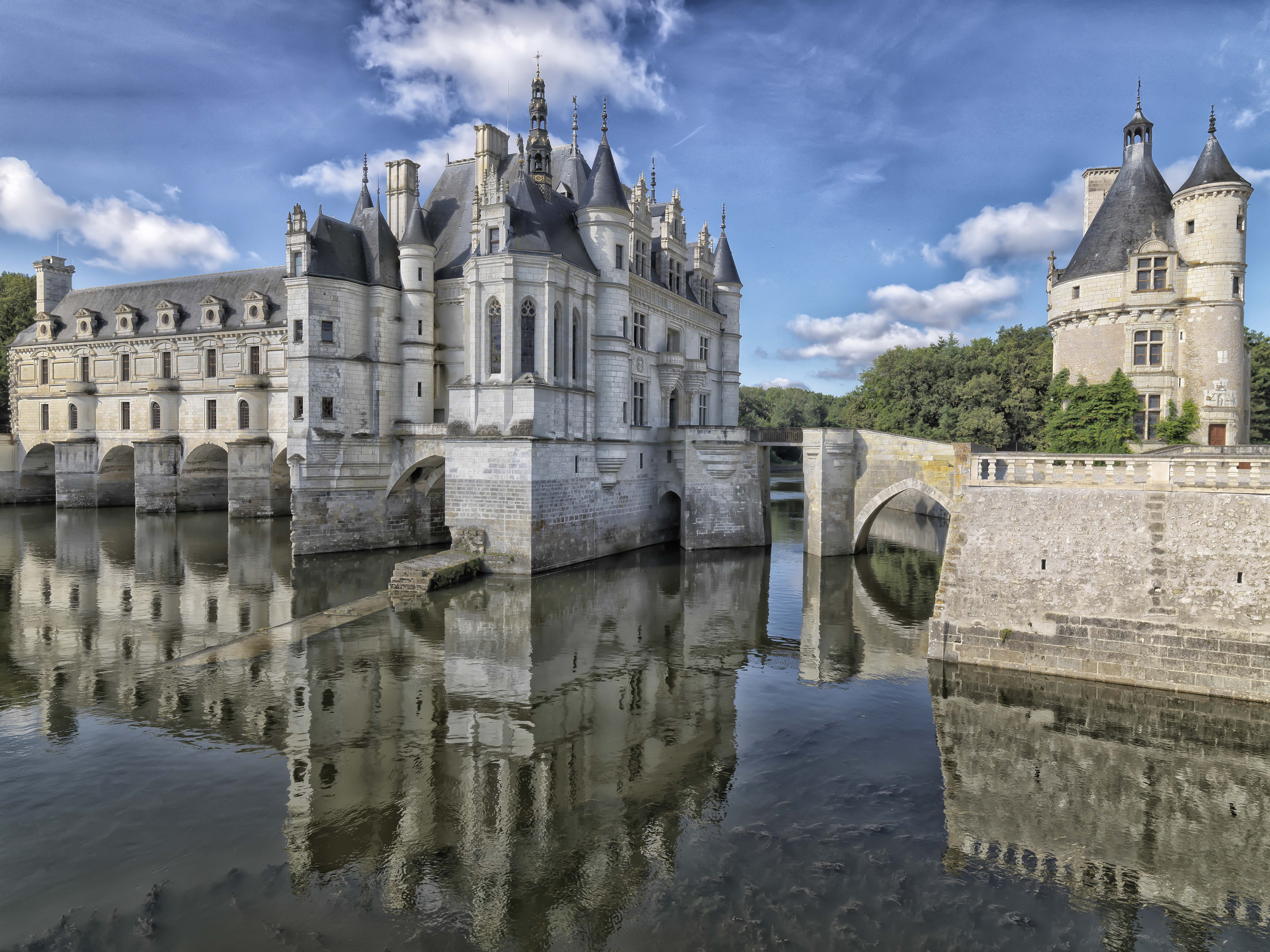
View from the northeast showing the chapel and the library

As Regent of France, Catherine spent a fortune on the château and on spectacular nighttime parties. In 1560, the first-ever fireworks display seen in France took place during the celebrations marking the ascension to the throne of Catherine's son Francis II. The grand gallery, which extended along the existing bridge to cross the entire river, was dedicated in 1577. Catherine also added rooms between the chapel and the library on the east side of the corps de logis, as well as a service wing on the west side of the entry courtyard.

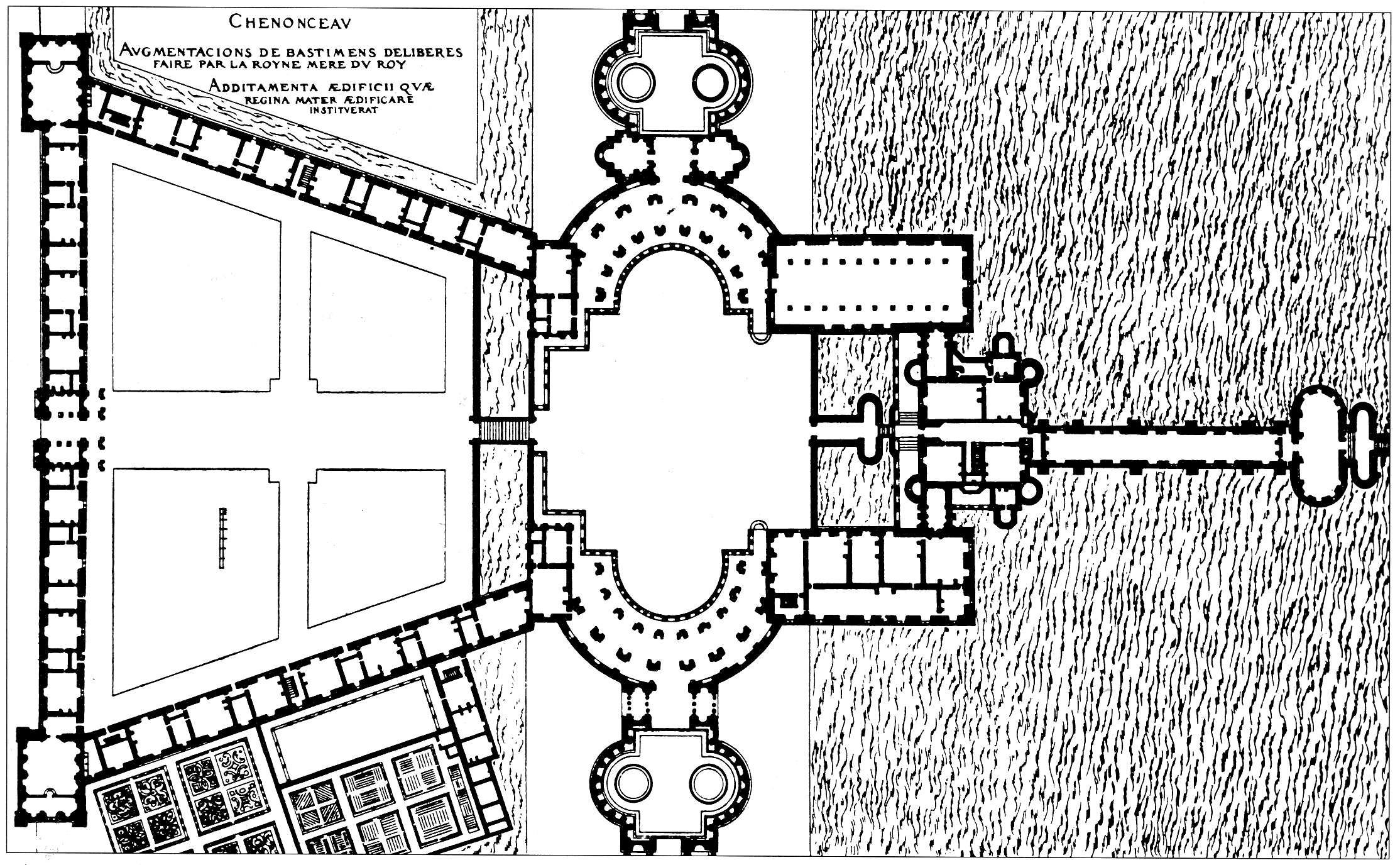
Project for the expansion of the château from Du Cerceau's 1579 book

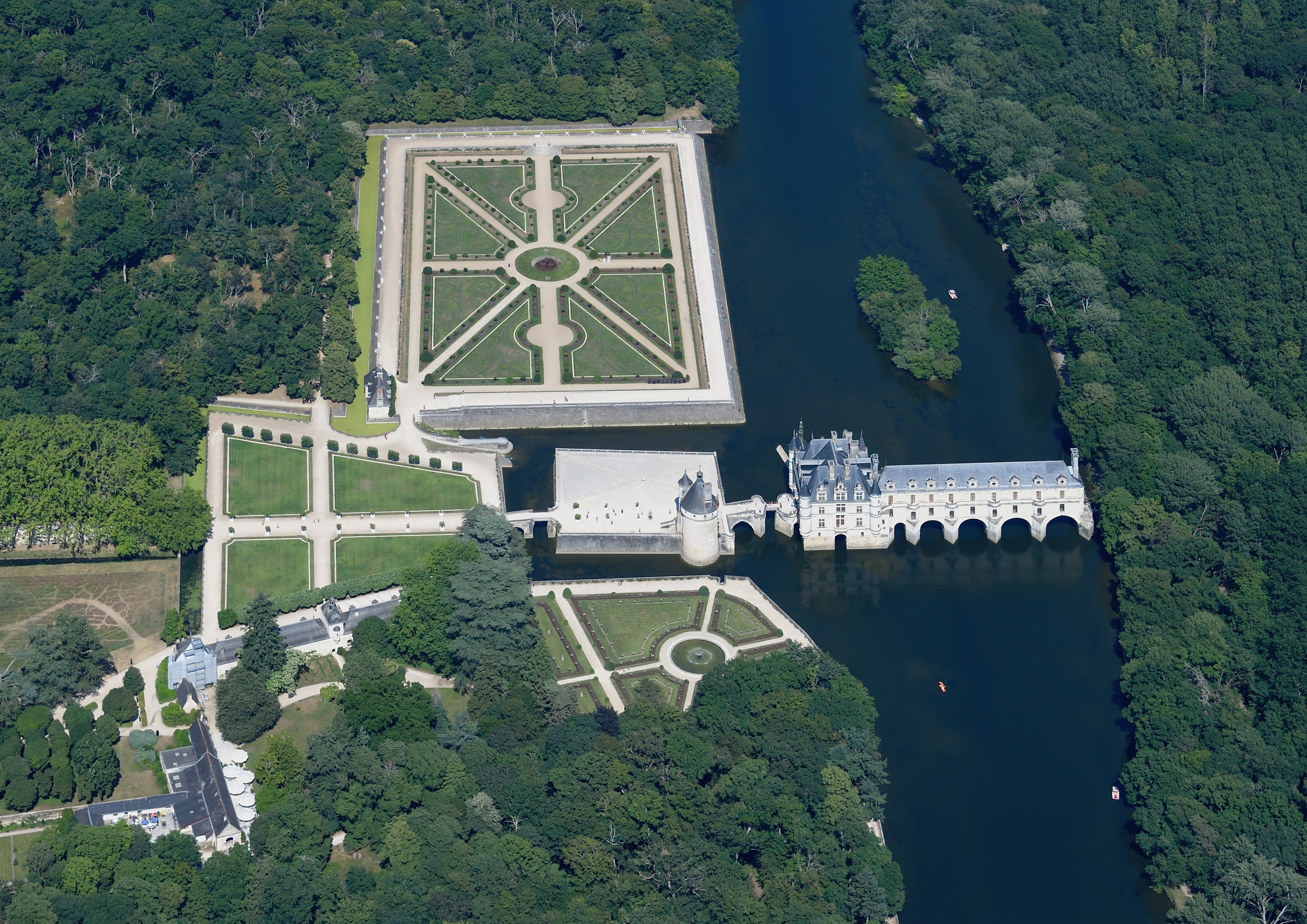
Aerial view of the château and its gardens

Catherine considered an even greater expansion of the château, shown in an engraving published by Jacques Androuet du Cerceau in the second (1579) volume of his book Les plus excellents bastiments de France. If this project had been executed, the current château would have been only a small portion of an enormous manor laid out "like pincers around the existing buildings."

=== Louise de Lorraine ===
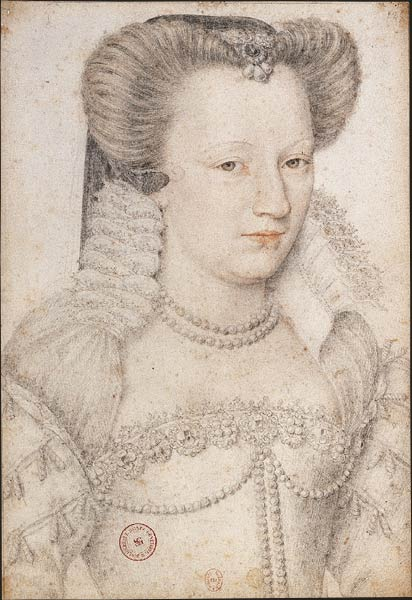
Louise de Lorraine

On Catherine's death, in January 1589, the château went to her daughter-in-law, Louise of Lorraine, wife of King Henry III. Louise was at Chenonceau when she learned of her husband's assassination, in August 1589, and she fell into a state of depression. Louise spent the next 11 years, until her death in January 1601, wandering aimlessly along the château's corridors dressed in mourning clothes, amidst sombre black tapestries stitched with skulls and crossbones.

=== Duc de Vendôme ===
Henry IV obtained Chenonceau for his mistress Gabrielle d'Estrées by paying the debts of Catherine de' Medici, which had been inherited by Louise and were threatening to ruin her. In return, Louise left the château to her niece Françoise de Lorraine, at that time six years old and betrothed to the four-year-old César, Duke of Vendôme, the natural son of Gabrielle d'Estrées and Henry IV. The château belonged to the Duke of Vendôme and his descendants for more than a hundred years. The Bourbons had little interest in the château, except for hunting. In 1650, Louis XIV was the last king of the ancien régime to visit.

The Château de Chenonceau was bought by the Duke of Bourbon in 1720. Little by little, he sold off all of the castle's contents. Many of the fine statues ended up at Versailles.

=== Louise Dupin ===
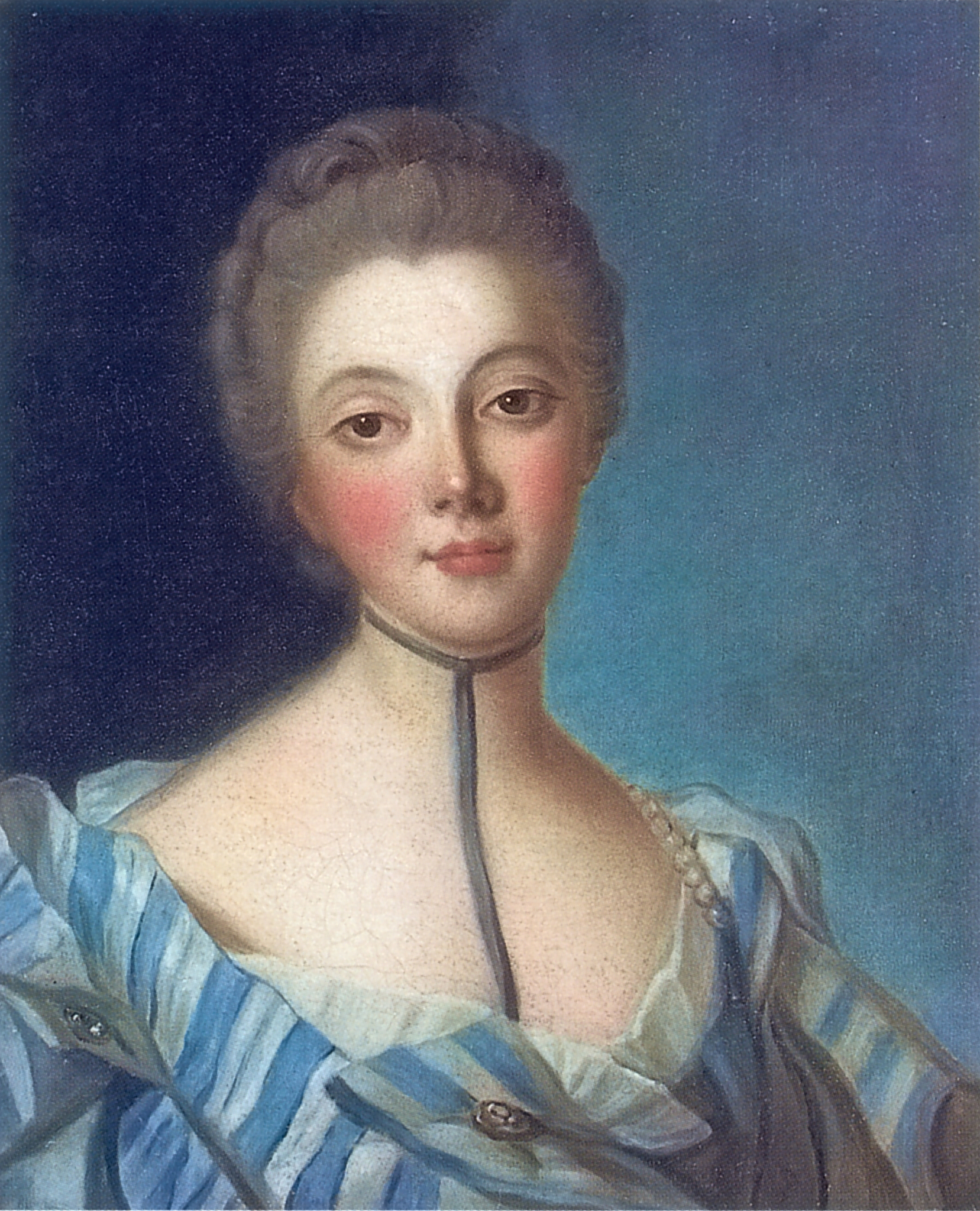
Louise Dupin by Nattier

In 1733 the estate was sold for 130,000 livres to a wealthy squire named Claude Dupin. His wife, Louise Dupin, was the natural daughter of the financier Samuel Bernard and the actress Manon Dancourt, whose mother was also an actress who had joined the Comédie Française in 1684. Louise Dupin was "an intelligent, beautiful, and highly cultivated woman who had the theatre in her blood." Claude Dupin, a widower, had a son, Louis Claude, from his first wife Marie-Aurore de Saxe, who was the grandmother of George Sand (born Aurore Dupin).

Louise Dupin's literary salon at Chenonceau attracted such leaders of the Enlightenment as the writers Voltaire, Montesquieu, and Fontenelle, the naturalist Buffon, the playwright Marivaux, the philosopher Condillac, as well as the Marquise de Tencin and the Marquise du Deffand. Jean-Jacques Rousseau was Dupin's secretary and tutored her son. Rousseau, who worked on Émile at Chenonceau, wrote in his Confessions: "We played music there and staged comedies. I wrote a play in verse entitled Sylvie's Path, after the name of a path in the park along the Cher."

The widowed Louise Dupin saved the château from destruction during the French Revolution, preserving it from being destroyed by the Revolutionaries because "it was essential to travel and commerce, being the only bridge across the river for many leagues."

=== Marguerite Pelouze ===
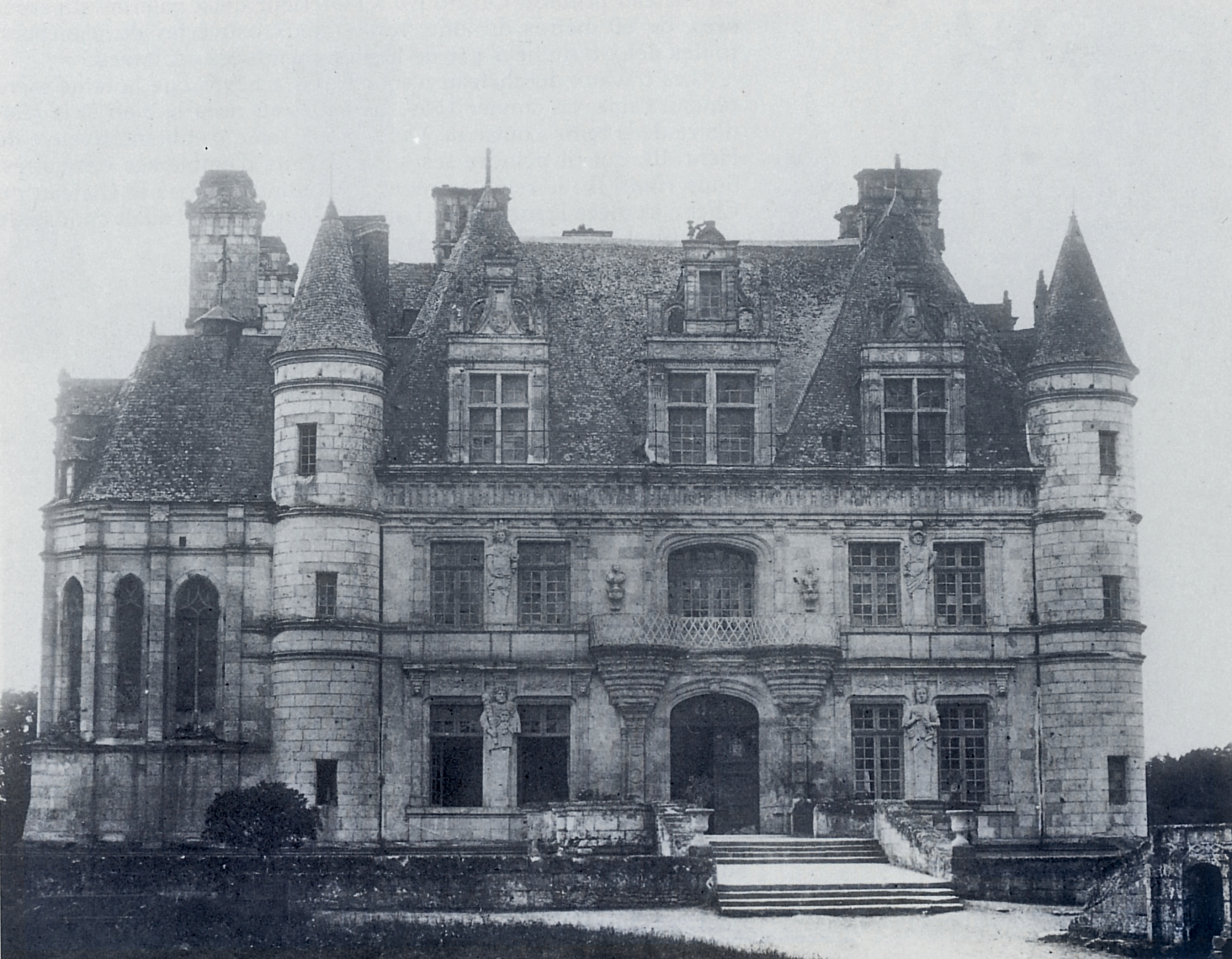
The entrance façade in 1851, before Roguet's interventions

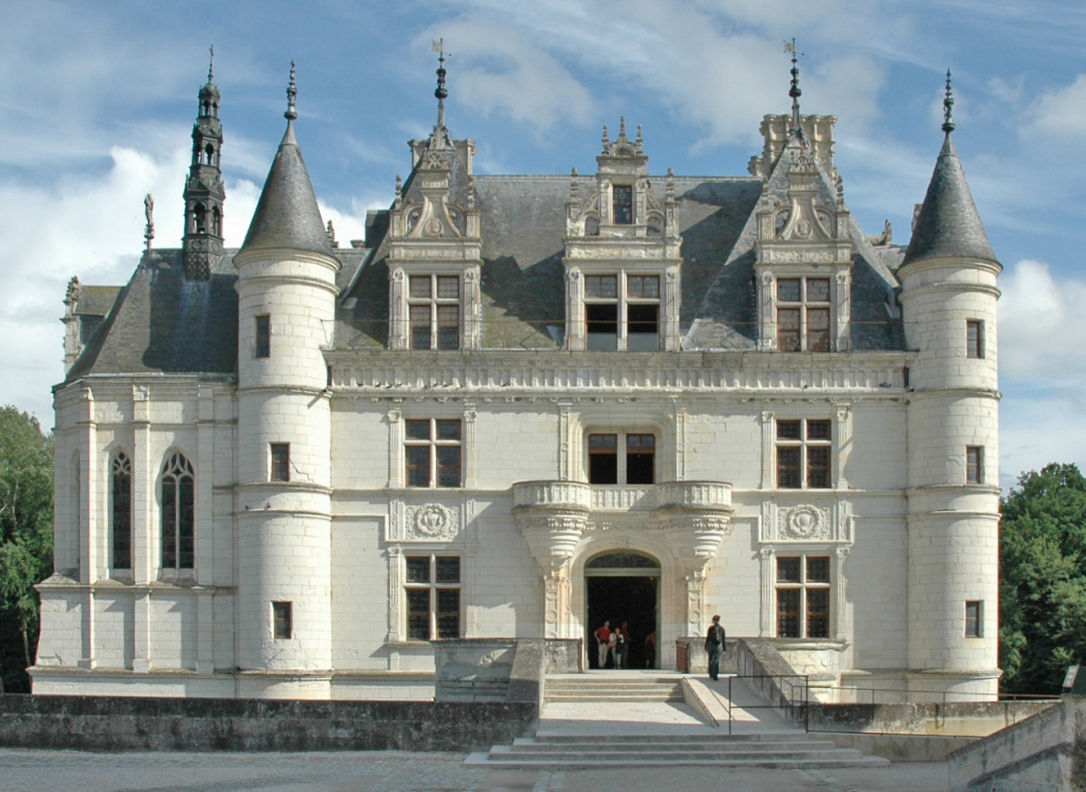
Entrance façade in 2007

In 1864 Marguerite Pelouze, a rich heiress, acquired the château. Around 1875 she commissioned the architect Félix Roguet to restore it. He almost completely renewed the interior and removed several of Catherine de' Medici's additions, including the rooms between the library and the chapel and her alterations to the north façade, among which were figures of Hercules, Pallas, Apollo, and Cybele that were moved to the park. With the money Marguerite spent on these projects and elaborate parties, her finances were depleted, and the château was seized and sold.

=== Recent history ===
José-Emilio Terry, a Cuban millionaire, acquired Chenonceau from Madame Pelouze in 1891. Terry sold it in 1896 to a family member, Francisco Terry. In 1913, the château was acquired by Henri Menier, a member of the Menier family, famous for their chocolates, and the family still owns it to this day.

During World War I, Gaston Menier set up the gallery to be used as a hospital ward. During the Second World War, the château was bombed by the Germans in June 1940. It was also a means of escaping from the Nazi-occupied zone on one side of the River Cher to the "free" zone on the opposite bank. Occupied by the Germans, the château was bombed by the Allies on 7 June 1944, when the chapel was hit and its windows destroyed.

In 1951, the Menier family entrusted the château's restoration to Bernard Voisin, who brought the dilapidated structure and the gardens (ravaged in the Cher flood in 1940) back to a reflection of its former glory.

== Gallery ==
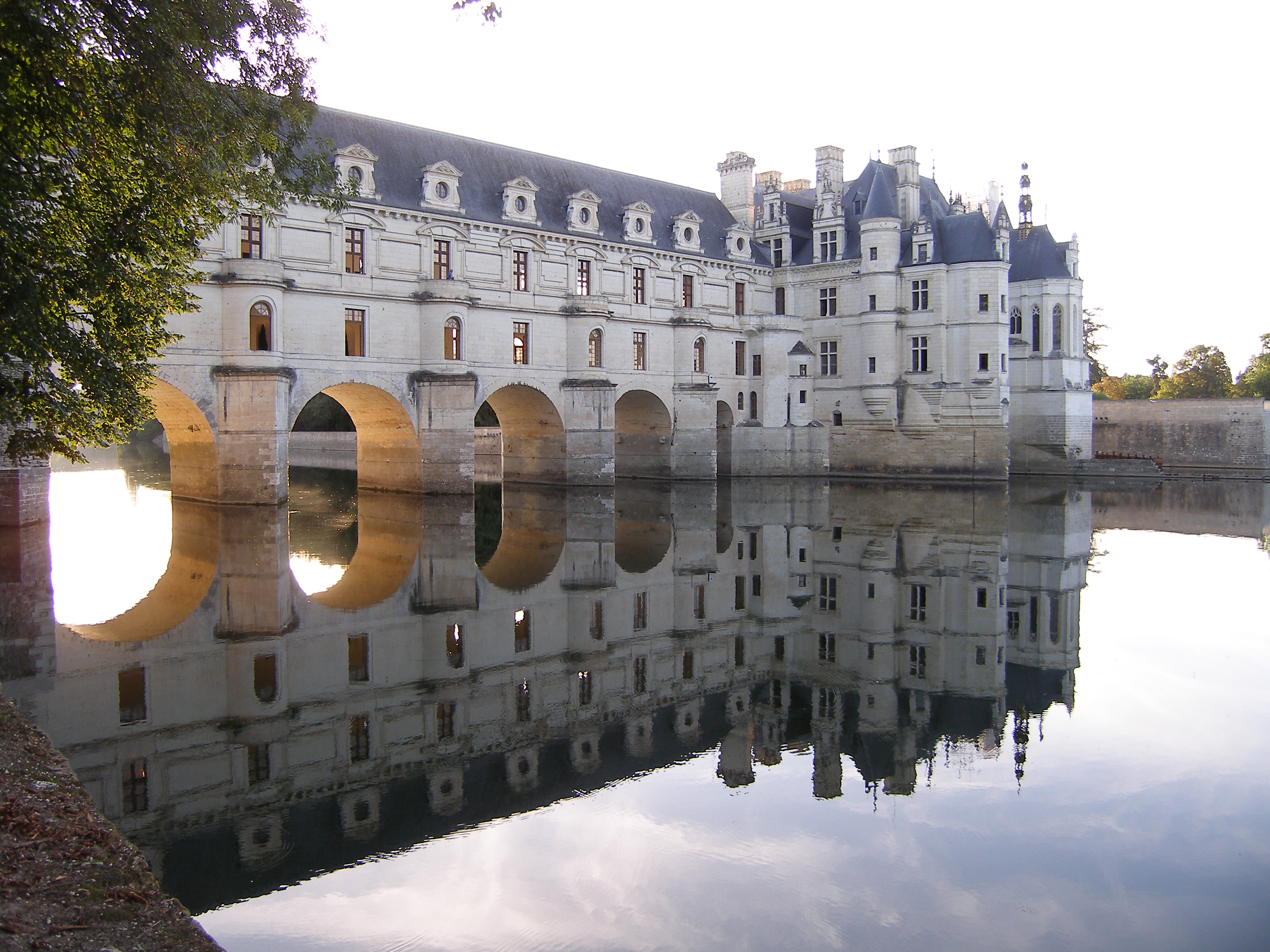
View from the southeast of the Castle

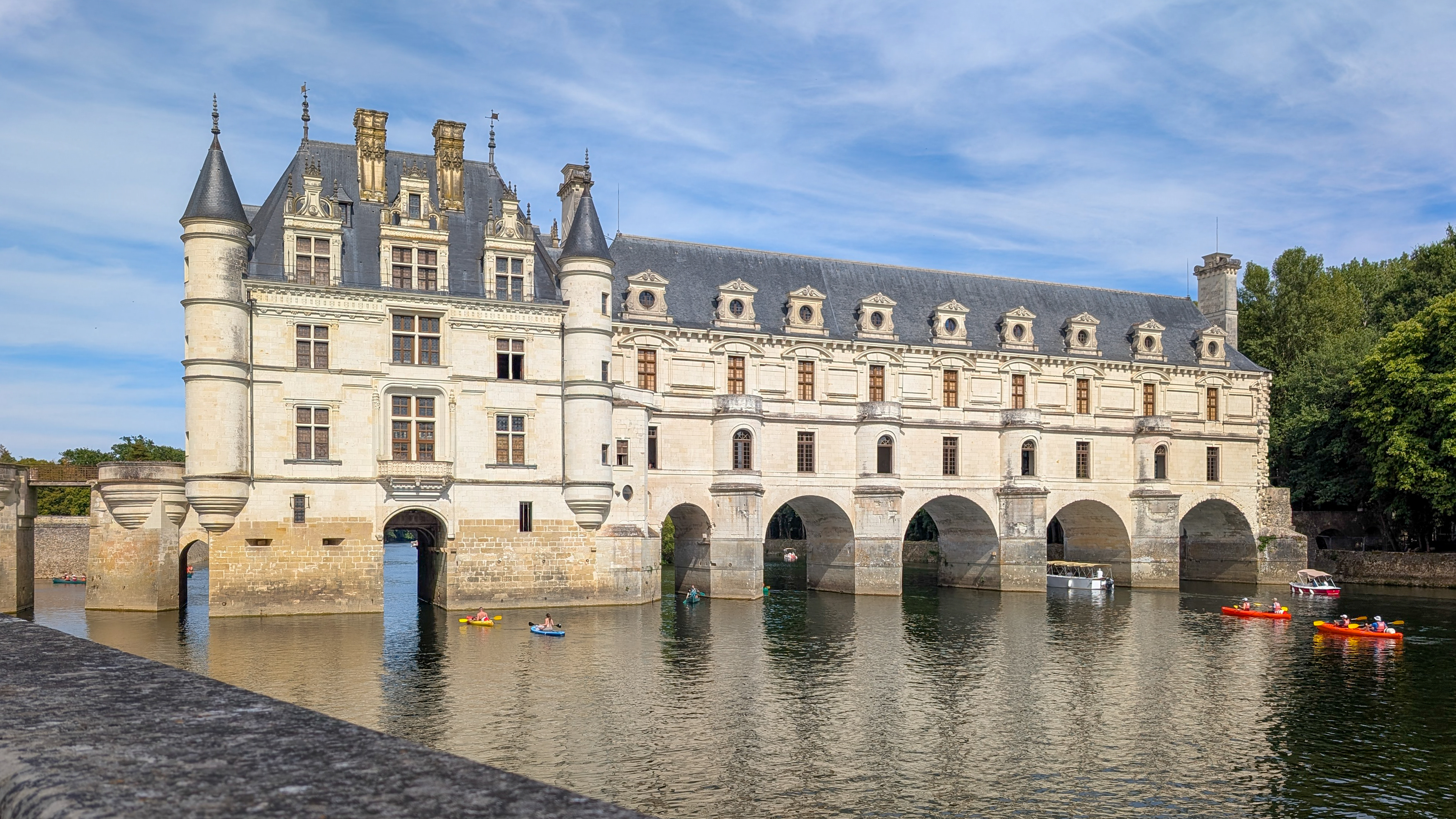
View of the west façade

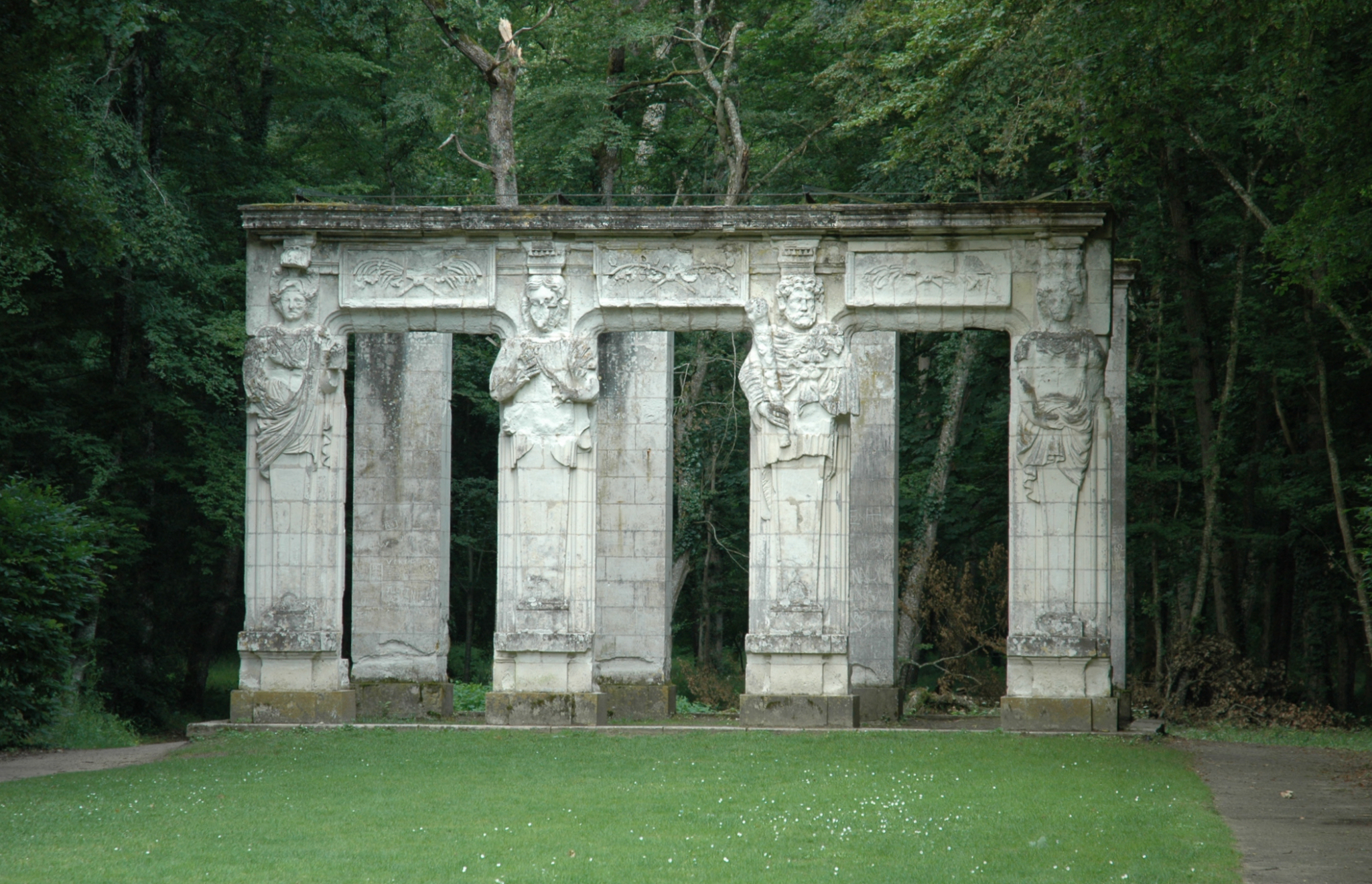
Caryatids, moved from the north façade to the park c. 1875

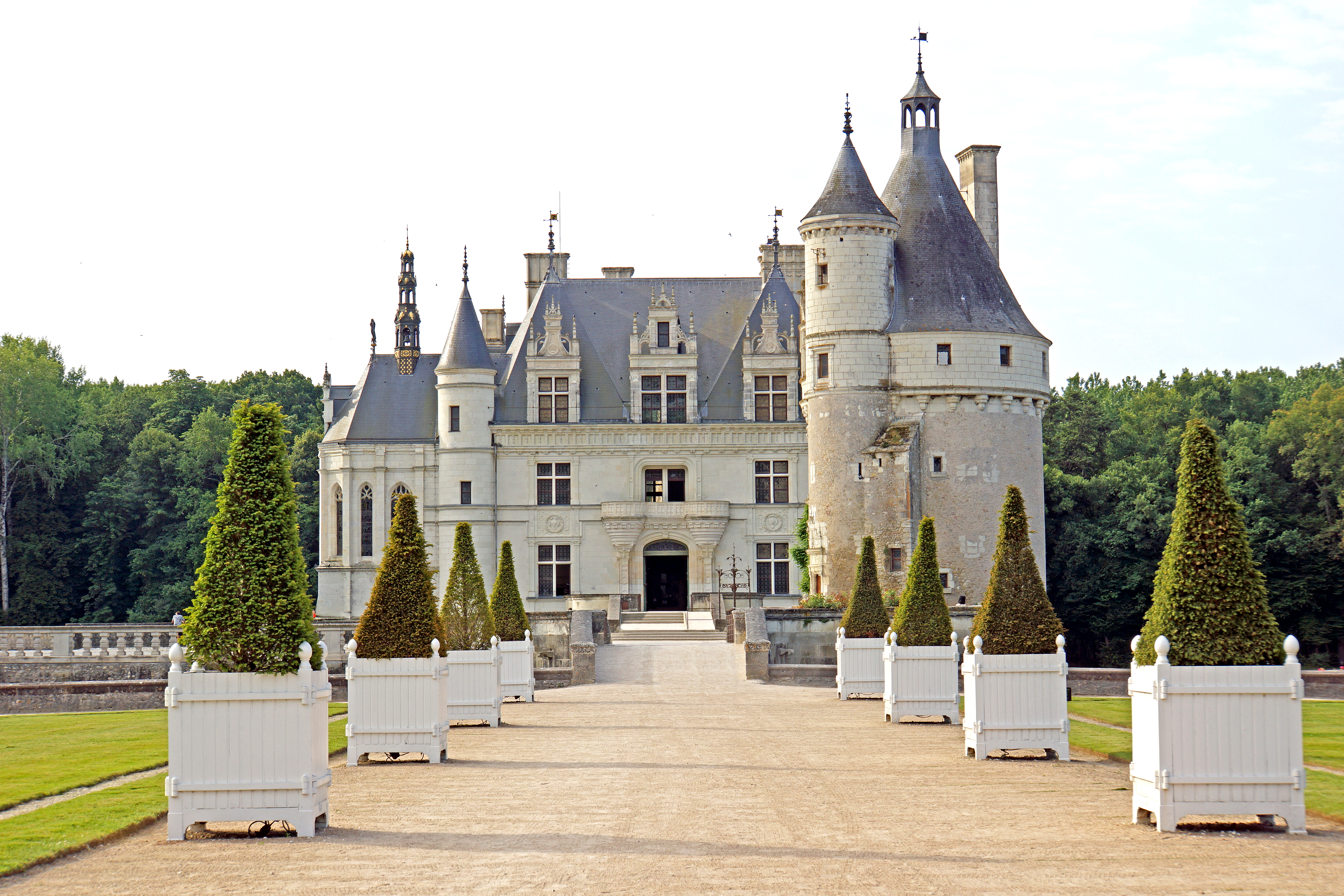
Approach to the entrance

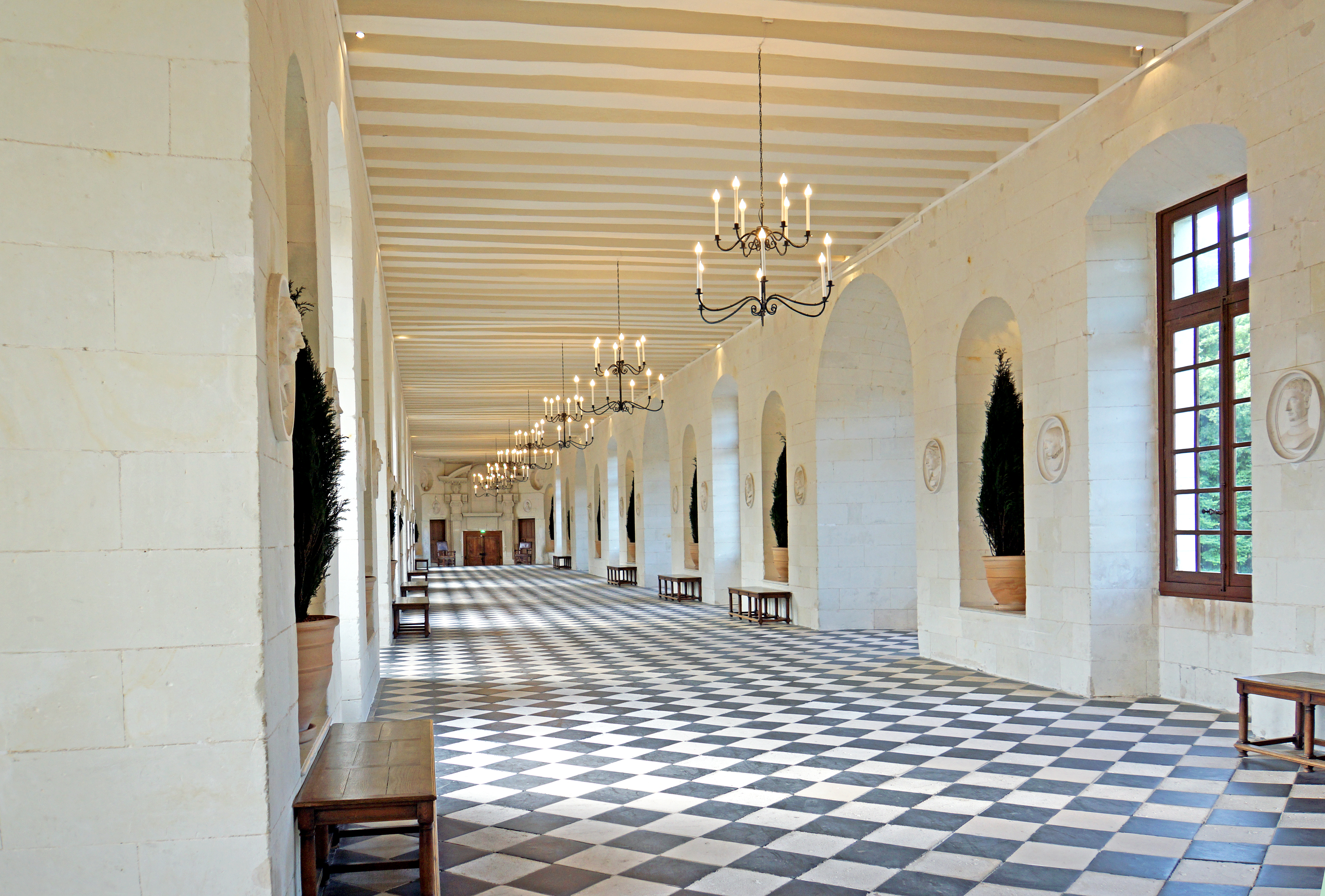
The gallery over the bridge

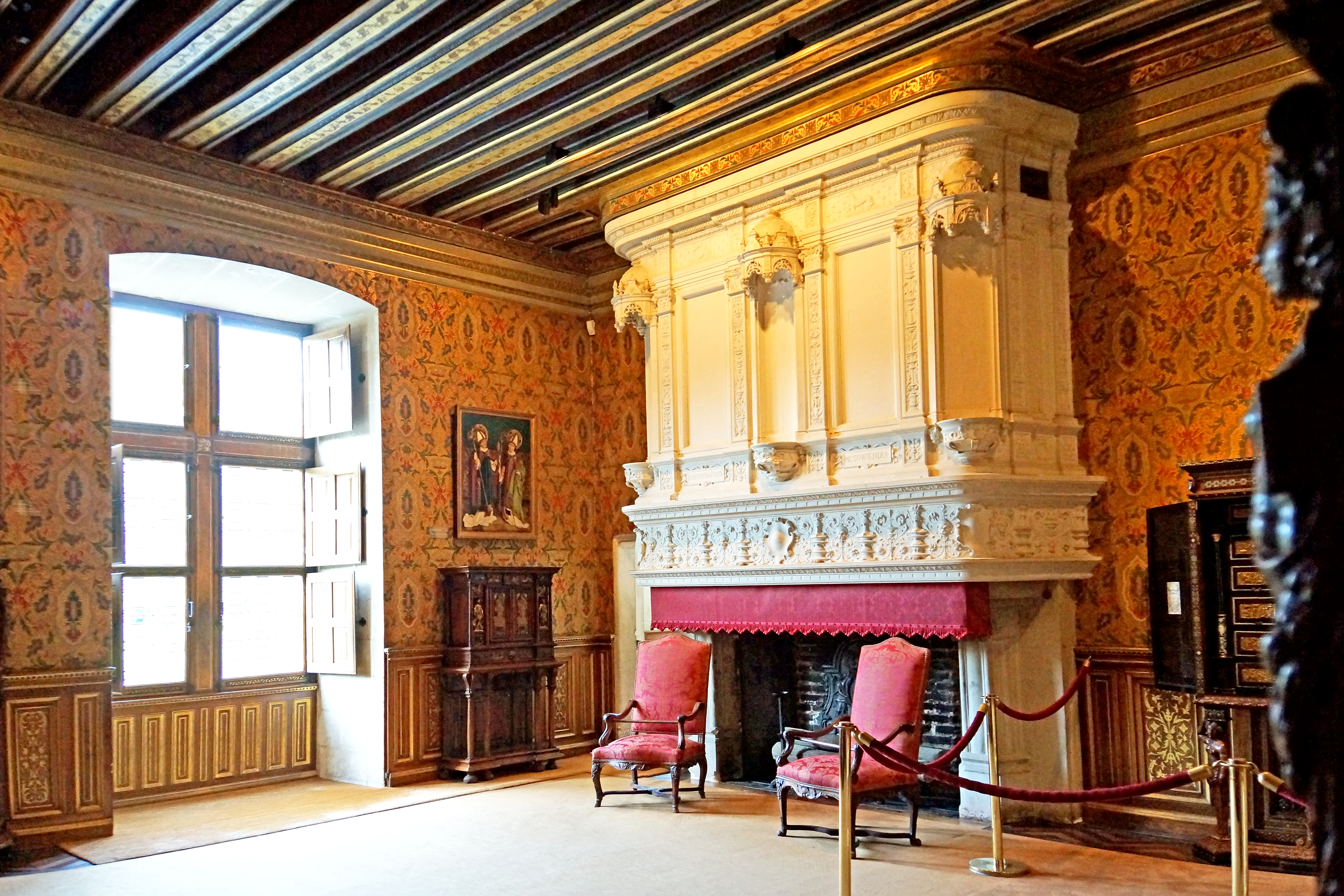
Francis I's Drawing Room

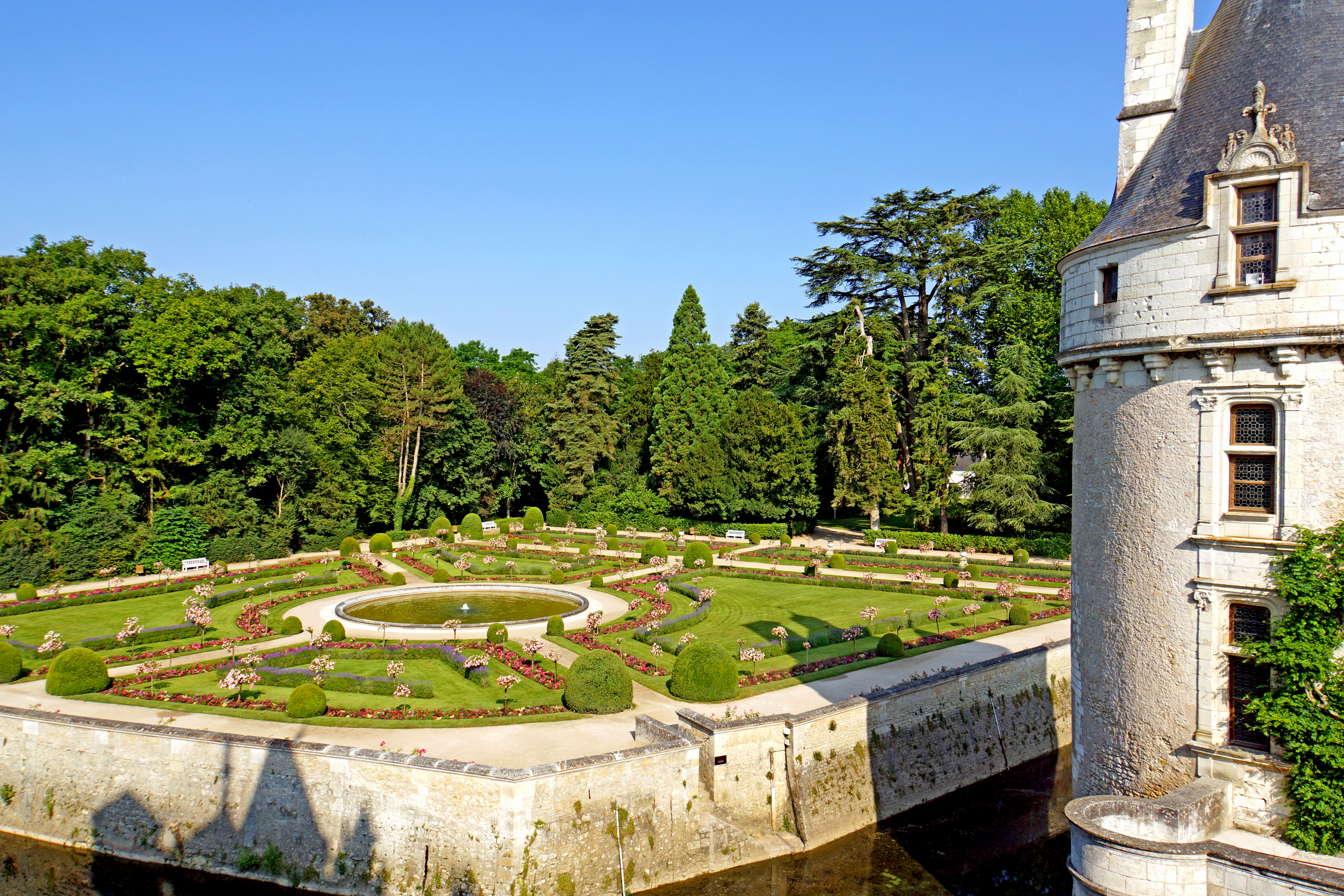
Garden of Catherine de' Medici

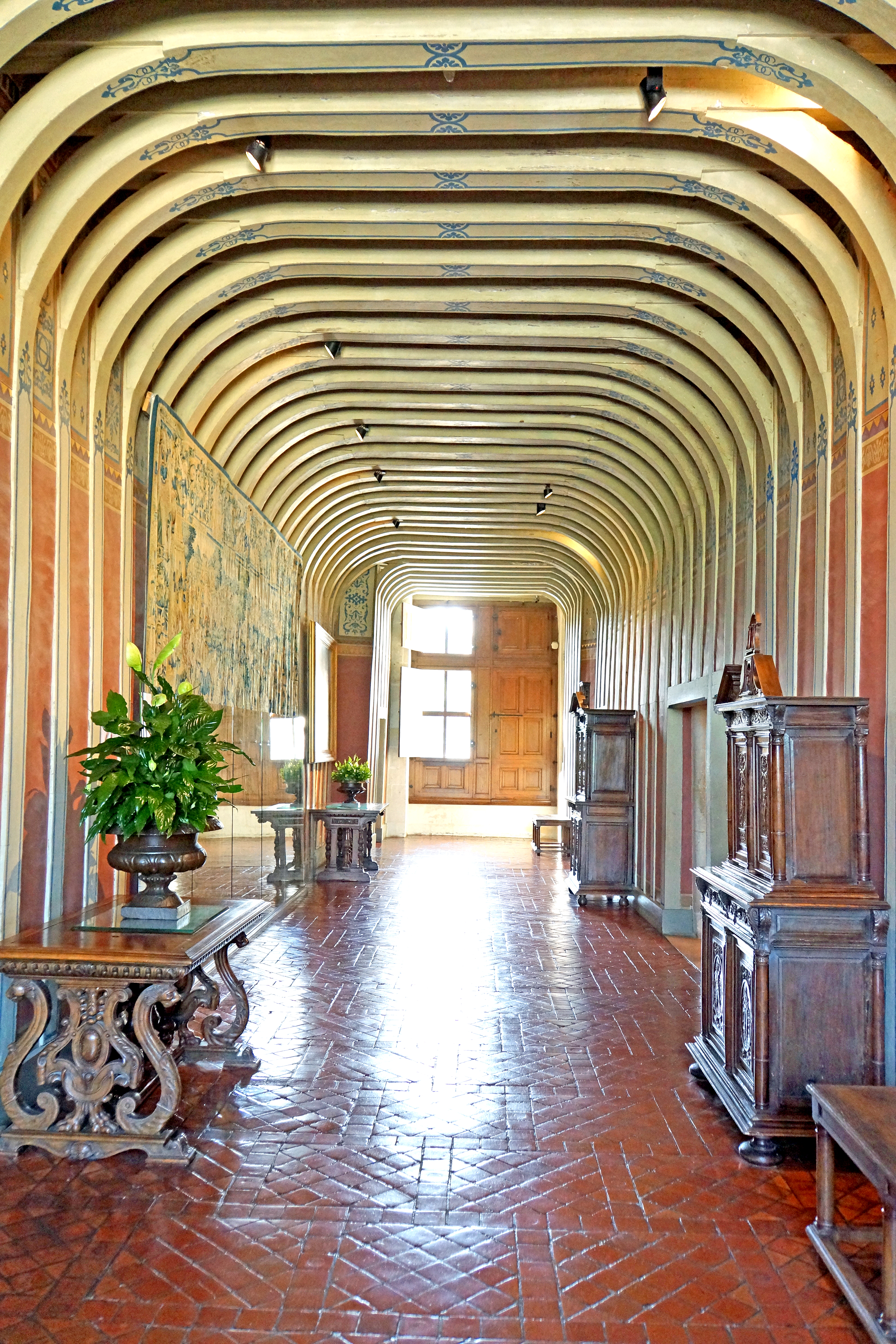
Second-floor hall

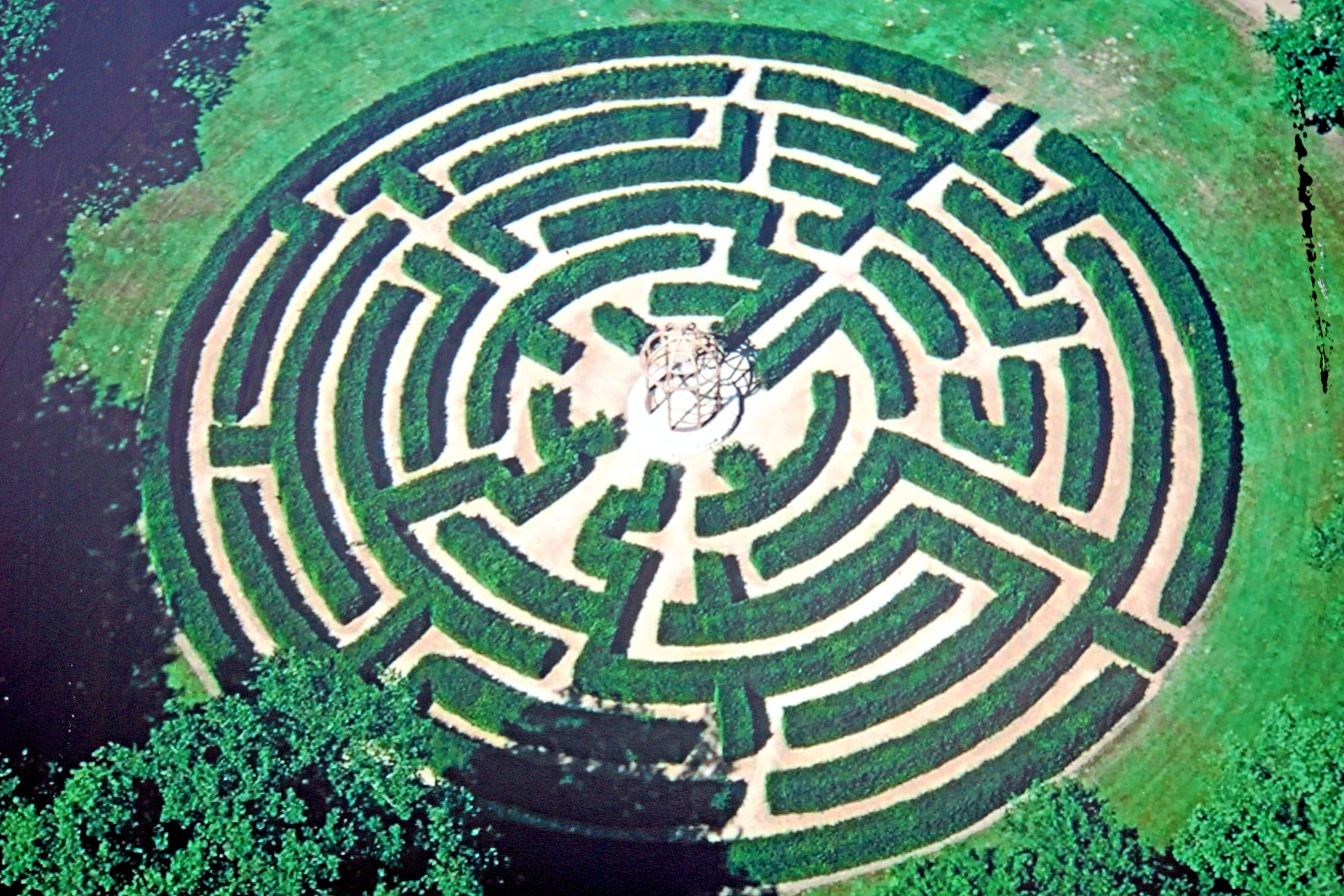
The garden maze

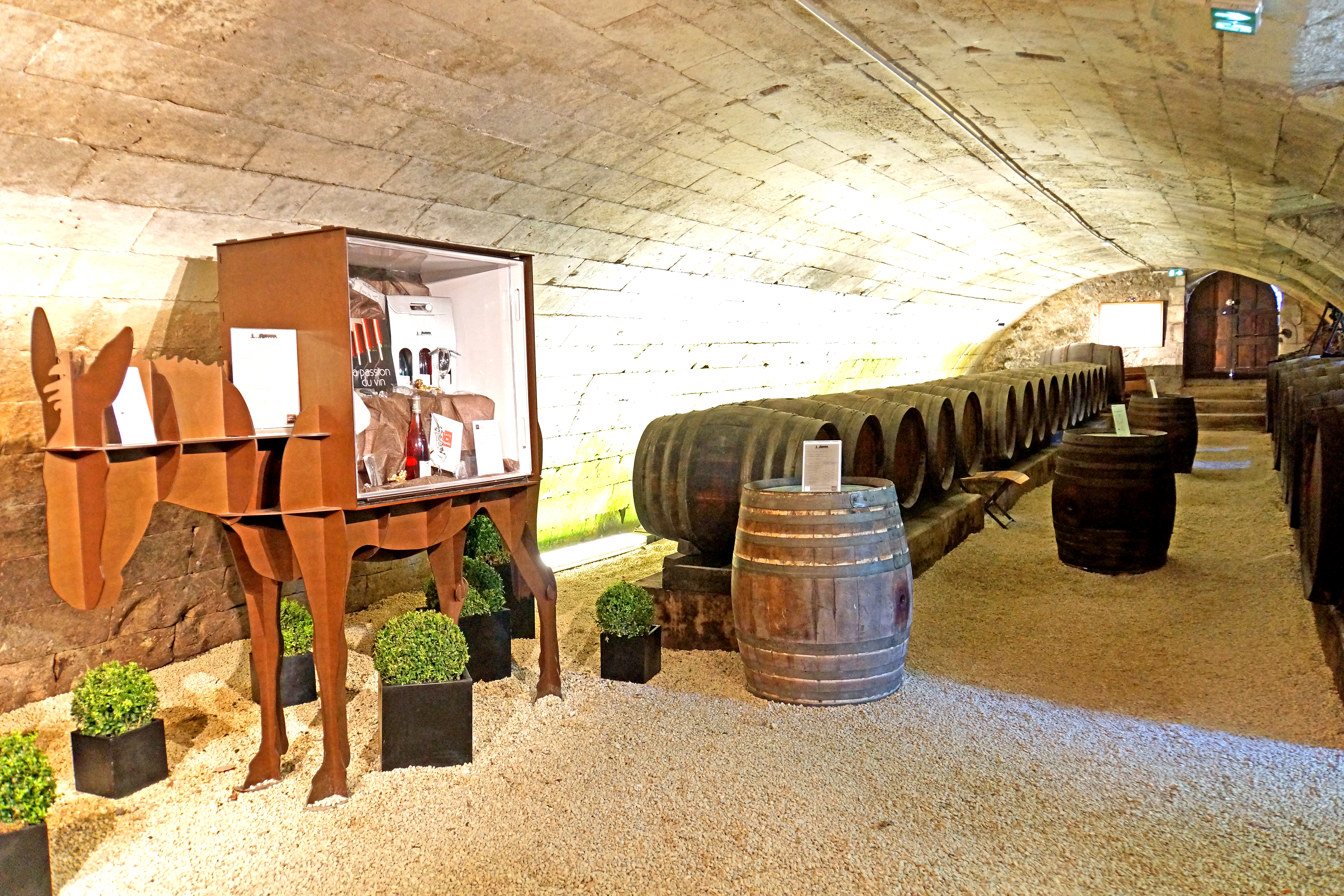
Wine cellar

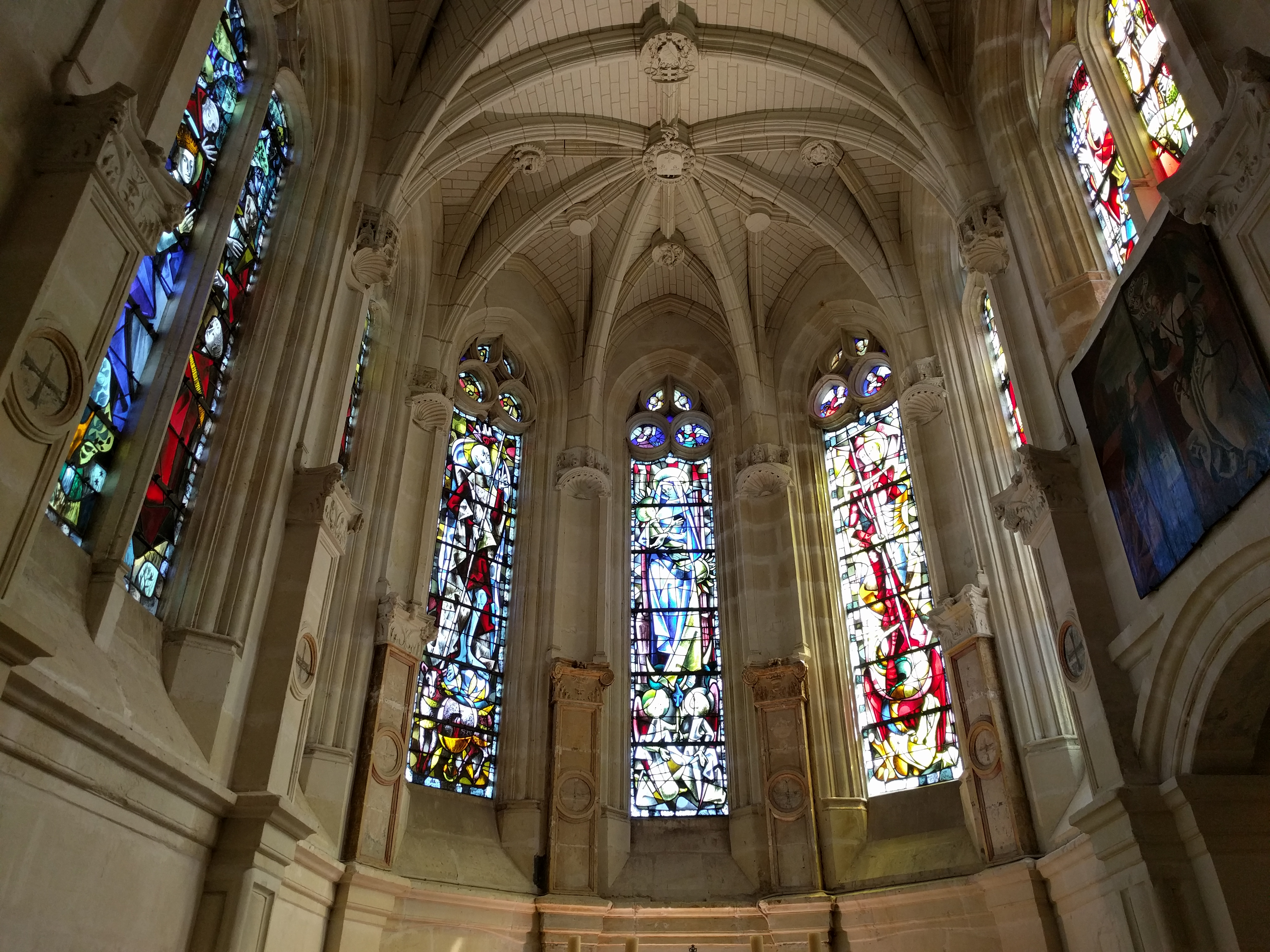
Chapel

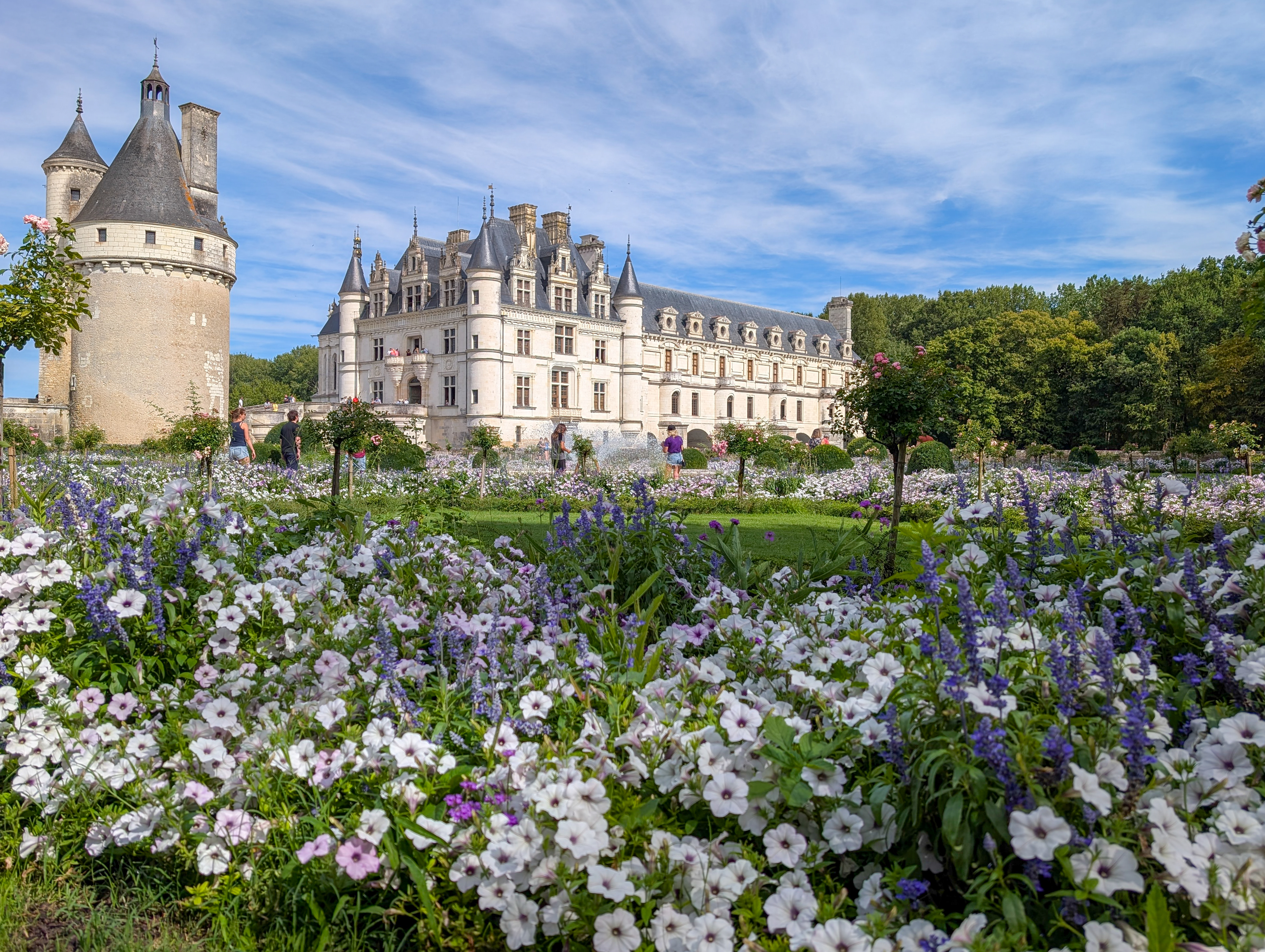
View from the Garden of Catherine de' Medici

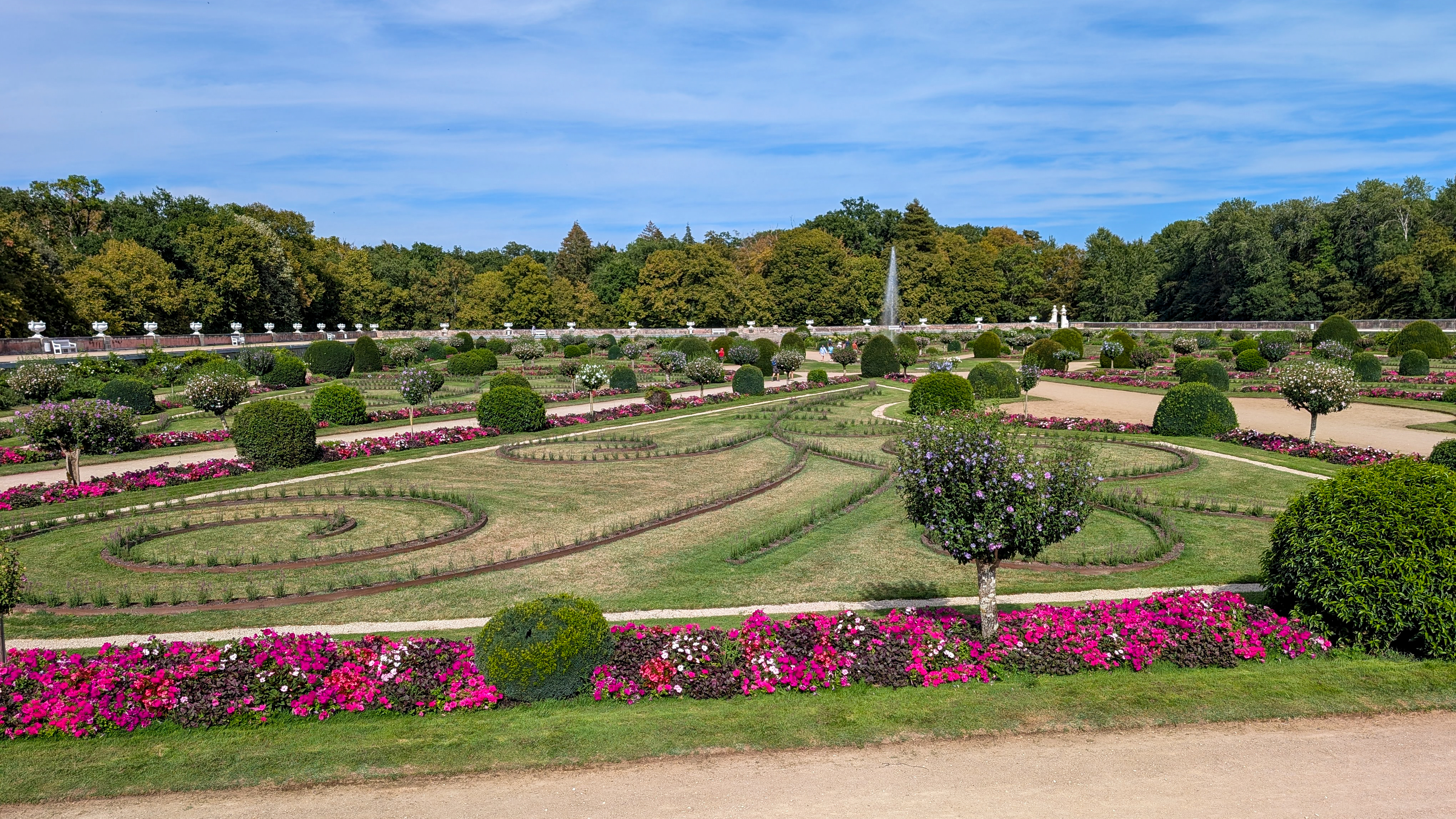
Garden of Diane de Poitiers

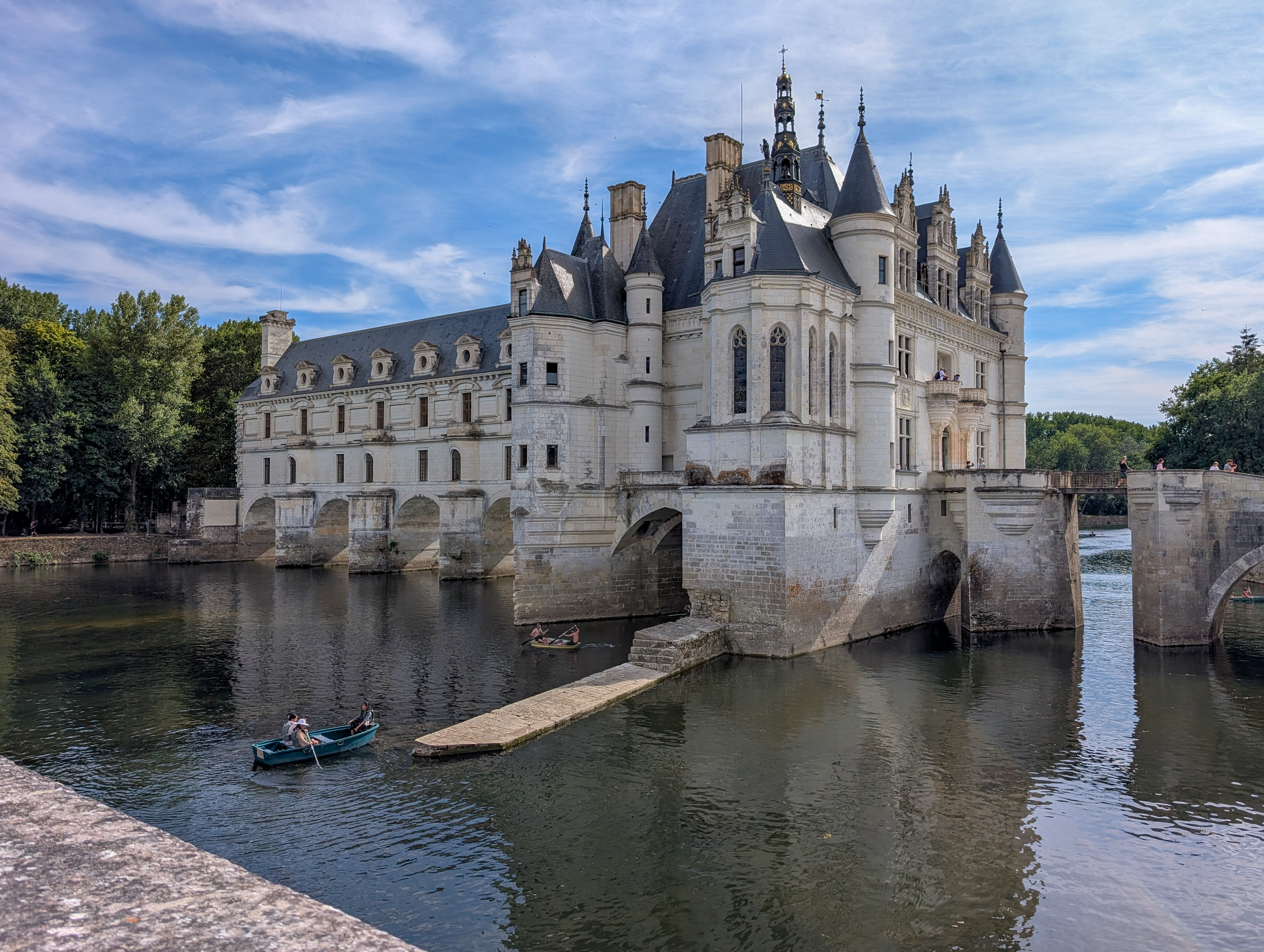

== In popular culture ==
In World War Z, a zombie apocalyptic horror novel by Max Brooks, the castle is a sanctuary for survivors.

The château is featured in great detail in the 2024 children's book The Night War by Kimberly Brubaker Bradley, which takes place during World War II.

== See also ==
- List of castles in France
- Château de Montsoreau, built in the Loire riverbed

== Bibliography ==
- Babelon, Jean-Pierre (1989). Chateaux de France au siècle de la Renaissance. Paris: Flammarion. ISBN 9782080120625.
- Beck, Shari (2011). A Portrait in Black and White: Diane de Poitiers in Her Own Words. Bloomington, Indiana: iUniverse. ISBN 9781462029815.
- Draper, James David; Papet, Edouard (2014). The Passions of Jean-Baptiste Carpeaux. New Haven: Yale University Press. ISBN 9780300204315.
- Gaigneron, Axelle de (1993). "Seven Ladies of Chenonceau". Chenonceau (English ed.). Paris: Société Française de Promotion Artistique. pp. 7–22. OCLC 34799004.
- Garrett, Martin (2010). The Loire: a Cultural History. Oxford: Oxford University Press. ISBN 978-0-1997-6839-4.
- Hanser, David A. (2006). Architecture of France. Westport, Connecticut: Greenwood Press. ISBN 9780313319020.
- Voisin, Bernard (1993). "The New Renaissance". Chenonceau (English ed.). Paris: Société Française de Promotion Artistique. pp. 51–62. OCLC 34799004.
- Wheeler, Daniel (1979). The Chateaux of France. London: Octopus Books. ISBN 9780706412604.
