= Moy (salt) =

Obsolete unit of measure for salt

A moy was a measure for salt, used in British colonial North America. It amounted to about 15 bushels.

== Origin of name ==
It likely derives from the Portuguese moio and the trade in salt between North America and the Azores. Alternatively, the term may have come from the Scots, moy - a certain measure.

== Sources ==
- Jameison, John (1880). An Etymological Dictionary of the Scottish Language: To which is Prefixed, a Dissertation on the Origin of the Scottish Language. Vol. 3. A. Gardner.
