= Almud =

The almud is a unit of measurement of volume used in France, Spain and in parts of the Americas that were colonized by each country. The word comes from the Arabic al-múdd." The exact value of the almud was different from region to region, and also varied according to the nature of the measured good. In Portugal the name almude was used and their values were much larger than the Spanish ones. It is still used in rural Mexico, Panama, Chile and other countries. An almud is a box with internal marks, indicating different measurements.

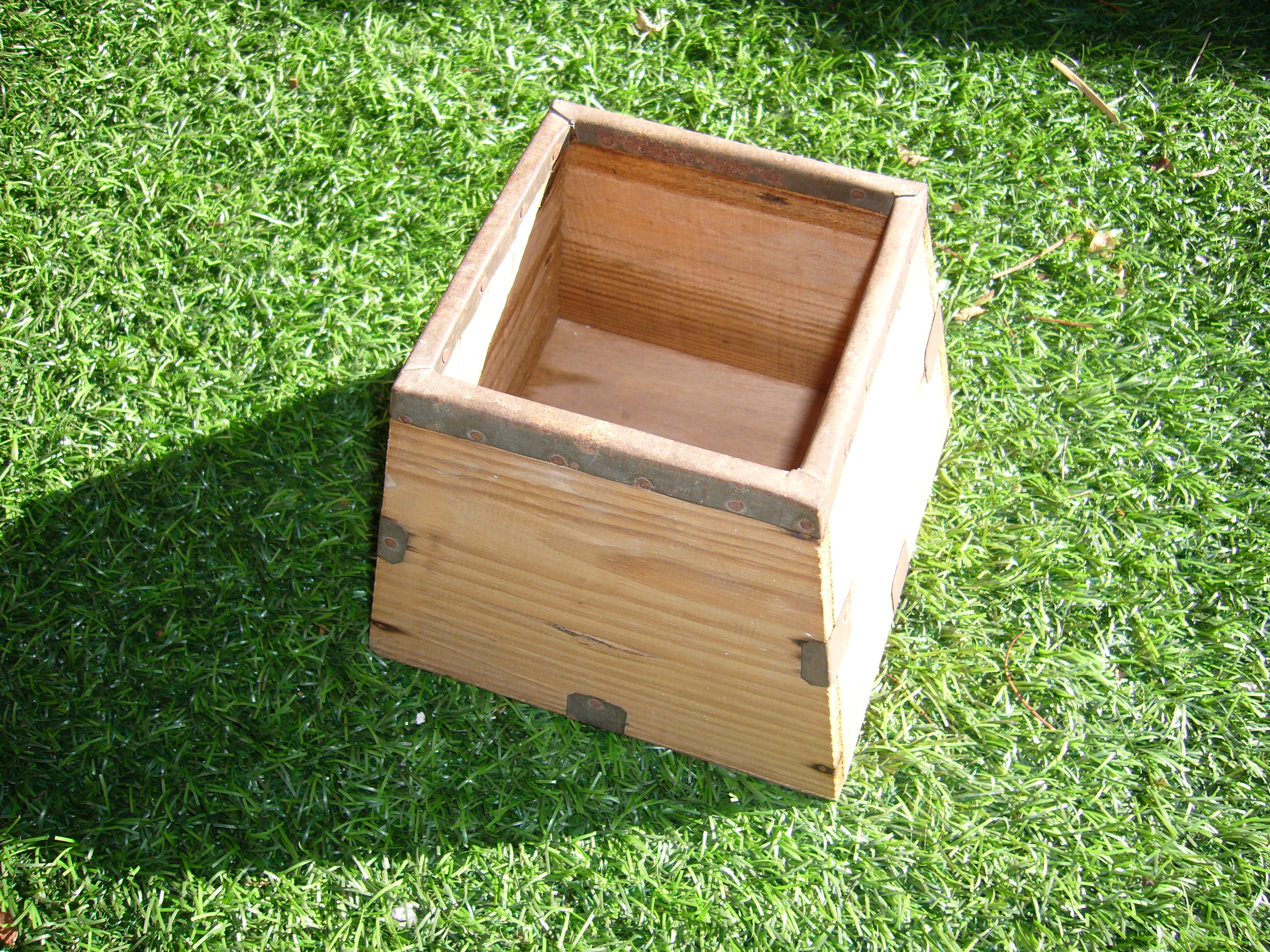
A ½ almud measuring box

It was also used to name a given surface of land, said surface corresponding to how much could be seeded with the quantity of grain contained in an almud.

- Iberian Spain: 4.625 liters
  - Canary Islands, at Las Palmas: 5.50 liters
- Argentina
  - Córdoba: 18.08 liters
  - Corrientes: 21.49 liters
  - Mendoza: 9.31 liters
- Belize: 5.683 liters
- Chile: 8.08 liters
- Mexico: 7.568 liters
- Philippines: 1.76 liters
- Puerto Rico: 20 liters
- United States, New Mexico: 412.71 cubic inches, approximately 6.76 liters.

== As unit of mass ==
In some South American countries an almud was a unit of mass.

- Bolivia
  - Tarata, Cochabamba: 7.36 kg.
  - Arampampa, Potosí: 4.14 kg.
  - Buena Vista, Santa Cruz: 14.72 kg.
- Ecuador: 12.88 kg.
- Venezuela: varied between 9 and 50 kg.

== See also ==
- Spanish customary units
