= Quintal =

Historical unit of mass (hundredweight variant)

The quintal or centner is a historical unit of mass in many countries that is usually defined as 100 base units, such as pounds or kilograms. It is a traditional unit of weight in France, Portugal, and Spain and their former colonies. It is commonly used for grain prices in wholesale markets in Ethiopia, Eritrea and India, where 1 quintal = 100 kg (220 lb).

In British English, it referred to the hundredweight; in American English, it formerly referred to an uncommon measurement of 100 kg (220 lb).

Languages drawing its cognate name for the weight from Romance languages include French, Portuguese, Romanian and Spanish quintal, Italian quintale, Esperanto kvintalo, Polish kwintal. Languages taking their cognates from Germanicized centner include the German Zentner, Lithuanian centneris, Swedish centner, Polish cetnar, Russian and Ukrainian центнер (tsentner) and Estonian tsentner.

Many European languages have come to translate both the British hundredweight (8 stone or 112 pounds [50.80 kg]) and the American hundredweight (100 pounds [45.36 kg]), as their cognate form of quintal or centner.

== Name ==
The concept has resulted in two different series of masses: Those based on the local pound (which after metrication was considered equivalent to 0.5 kg (1.1 lb), and those uprated to being based on the kilogram.

In Albania (kuintal), Ethiopia (kuntal), and India, the 100 kg (220 lb) definition may have been introduced via Islamic trade. It is a standard measurement of mass for agricultural products in those countries.

In France it used to be defined as 100 livres (pounds), about 48.95 kg (108 lb), and has been redefined as 100 kg (mesures usuelles), thus called metric quintal with symbol qq. In Spain, the quintal is still defined as 100 libras, or about 46 kg (101 lb), but the metric quintal is also defined as 100 kg; In Portugal a quintal is 128 arráteis or about 58.75 kg (130 lb).

The German Zentner and the Danish centner are pound-based, and thus since metrication are defined as 50 kg (110 lb), whereas the Austrian and Swiss Zentner since metrication has been re-defined as 100 kg. In Germany a measure of 100 kg is named a Doppelzentner.

In Italy, the quintale is commonly used to refer to 100 kg and is abbreviated to q, but the usage is considered informal and is not considered legally valid since 1990.

Common agricultural units used in the Soviet Union were the 100 kg tsentner (центнер) and the term "tsentner per hectare". These are still used by countries that were part of the Soviet Union.

== English use ==
In English units of measurement both terms quintal and centner were once alternative names for the hundredweight and thus defined either as 100 lb (45.36 kg) or as 112 lb (50.80 kg). Also, in the Dominican Republic it is about 125 lb (56.70 kg). The German Zentner was introduced to the English language via Hanseatic trade as a measure of the weight of certain crops including hops for beer production. Commonly used in the Dominion (and later province) of Newfoundland up until the 1960s as a measure for 112 lb of salt cod.

The quintal was defined in the United States in 1866 as 100 kg (220 lb). However, it is no longer used in the United States or by the National Institute of Standards and Technology (NIST), though it still appears in the statute.

In France, Italy, Poland, the Czech Republic, Slovakia, Indonesia, and India, it is still in daily use by farmers. It is also used in Brazil and other South American countries and in some African countries including Angola.

== See also ==
- Kasson Act (1866)
- Hundredweight
- Zentner
