= Arrátel =

Deprecated measure of weight

The arrátel (Portuguese pronunciation: [ɐˈʁatɛl]; plural arráteis) was the base unit of weight in the Portuguese customary measurement system. Until the adoption of the metric system in the 19th century, the arrátel was used in Portugal, Brazil and other parts of the Portuguese Empire.

The real value of the arrátel fluctuated during the Middle Ages. Before King Peter I, the main arrátel seems to have been equivalent to 12 1/2 ounces. With Peter I, the official arrátel increased to 14 ounces. Finally, the Portuguese arrátel was fixed at 16 ounces by decree of King Manuel I in 1499. This arrátel, which was kept as the national standard until the introduction of the metric system, was similar to the Spanish libra.

== Arrátel values ==
- 13th century: 12 1/2 onças (ounces) = 25/32 libra = 0.3596 kilograms
- 15th century: 14 onças = 0.4025 kg
- 1499: 16 onças = 1 libra = 1.011 avoirdupois pounds = 0.4590 kg

== See also ==
- Portuguese customary units
- Pound (mass)
