= Canada (unit) =

The canada (Portuguese pronunciation: [kɐˈnaðɐ]) was the unit of liquid volume of the ancient Portuguese measurement system. It was used in Portugal, Brazil and other parts of the Portuguese Empire until the adoption of the metric system. It was equivalent to 4 quartilhos (pints). The exact value of the canada varied from region to region, the canada of Lisbon being equivalent to 1.4 litres.

In the Portuguese metric system officially adopted in August 1814, "canada" was the name given to the unit of liquid volume. This metric canada was equivalent to 1 litre.

The canada is still used in some rural areas of Portugal and Brazil to indicate a liquid volume of between 1.5 and 2.0 liters.

== See also ==
- Portuguese customary units
