= Portuguese units of measurement =

Units of measure used in the Portuguese Empire

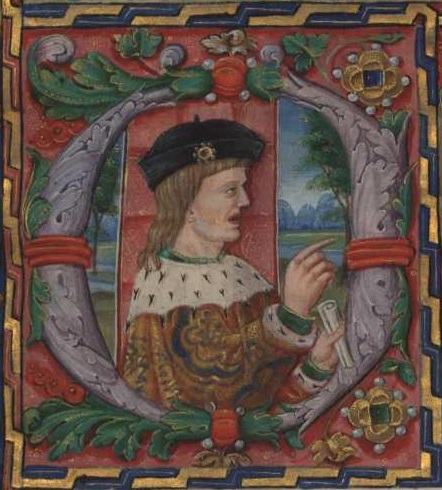
King Manuel I, who fixed the country's measurement standards, in 1499–1504.

Portuguese units were used in Portugal, Brazil, and other parts of the Portuguese Empire until the adoption of the metric system in the 19th century and have continued in use in certain contexts since.

The various systems of weights and measures used in Portugal until the 19th century combine remote Roman influences with medieval influences from northern Europe and Islam. These influences are obvious in the names of the units. The measurement units themselves were, in many cases, inherited from a distant past. From the Romans, Portugal inherited names like palmo (Latin: palmus), côvado (Latin: cubitus), libra, onça (Latin: uncia), moio (Latin: modius), quarteiro (Latin: quartarius), sesteiro (Latin: sextarius). From medieval northern Europe, Portugal inherited names like marco (English: mark, French: marc), búzio (English: bushel, French: boisseau), tonel (English: tun, French: tonneau), pinta (English: pint, French: pinte), choupim (Fr. French: chopine), etc. From the Moors, Portugal receive unit names like arrátel (Arabic: ratl), arroba (Arabic: rub), quintal (Arabic: qintar), alqueire (Arabic: kayl), almude (Arabic: mudd), fanega (Arabic: faniqa), cafiz (Arabic: qafiz), etc. The Roman and northern European influences were more present in the north. The Islamic influence was more present in the south of the country. Fundamental units like the alqueire and the almude were imported by the northwest of Portugal in the 11th century, before the country became independent of León.

The gradual long-term process of standardization of weights and measures in Portugal is documented mainly since the mid-14th century. In 1352, municipalities requested standardization in a parliament meeting (Cortes). In response, Afonso IV decided to set the alna (aune) of Lisbon as standard for the linear measures used for color fabrics across the country. A few years later, Pedro I carried a more comprehensive reform, as documented in the parliament meeting of 1361: the arrátel folforinho of Santarém should be used for weighing meat; the arroba of Lisbon would be the standard for the remaining weights; cereals should be measured by the alqueire of Santarém; the almude of Lisbon should be used for wine. With advances, adjustments and setbacks, this framework predominated until the end of the 15th century.

In 1455, Afonso V accepted the coexistence of six regional sets of standards: Lisbon, Santarém, Coimbra, Porto, Guimarães and Ponte de Lima. Two important weight standards coexisted, one given by the Colonha mark (variant of the Cologne mark), and another given by the Tria mark (variant of the Troyes mark). Colonha was used for precious metals and coinage and Tria was used for haver-de-peso (avoirdupois). The Tria by mark was abolished by João II in 1488.

The official system of units in use in Portugal from the 16th to the 19th century was the system introduced by Manuel I around 1499–1504. The most salient aspect of this reform was the distribution of bronze weight standards (nesting weight piles) to the cities and towns of the kingdom. The reform of weights is unparalleled in Europe until this time, due to the number of distributed standards (132 are identified), their sizes (64 to 256 marks) and their elaborate decoration. In 1575, Sebastian I distributed bronze standards of capacity measures to the main towns. The number of distributed standards was smaller and uniformity of capacity measures was never achieved.

The first proposal for the adoption of the decimal metric system in Portugal appears in Chichorro's report on weights and measures (Memória sobre Pesos e Medidas, 1795). Two decades later, in 1814, Portugal was the second country in the world – after France itself – to officially adopt the metric system. The system then adopted reused the names of the Portuguese traditional units instead of the original French names (e.g.: vara for metre; canada for litre; and libra for kilogram). However, several difficulties prevented the implementation of the new system and the old Portuguese customary units continued to be used, both in Portugal and in Brazil (which became an independent country in 1822). The metric system was finally adopted by Portugal and its remaining colonies in 1852, this time using the original names of the units. Brazil continued to use the Portuguese customary units until 1862, only then adopting the metric system.

== Route units ==
Portuguese name	English name	Subdivides in	Equivalence in Léguas de 20 ao grau	Metric equivalence
Légua de 18 ao grau	League of 18 to the degree		20/18 (≈1,11)	6 173 m
Légua de 20 ao grau	League of 20 to the degree	3 milhas geográficas	1	5 555 m
Milha geográfica	Geographical mile		1/3	1 852 m

== Length units ==
Portuguese name	English name	Subdivides in	Equivalence in varas	Metric equivalence
Braça	Fathom	2 varas	2	2.2 m
Toesa	Toise	6 pés	1 4/5	1.98 m
Passo geométrico	Geometrical pace	5 pés	1 1/2	1.65 m
Vara	Yard	5 palmos	1	1.1 m
Côvado	Cubit	3 palmos	3/5	0.66 m
Pé	Foot	12 polegadas	3/10	0.33 m
Palmo de craveira	Span	8 polegadas	1/5	0.22 m
Polegada	Inch	12 linhas	1/40	27.5 mm
Linha	Line	12 pontos	1/480	2.29 mm
Ponto	Point		1/5760	0.19 mm

== Mass units ==
Portuguese name	English name	Subdivides into	Equivalence in arráteis	Metric equivalence
Tonelada	Tonne	13.5 quintais	1728	793,152 g
Quintal	Hundredweight	4 arrobas	128	58,752 g
Arroba	Arroba	32 arráteis	32	14,688 g
Arrátel	Pound	4 quartas	1	459 g
Marco	Mark	8 onças	1/2	229.50 g
Quarta	Quarter	4 onças	1/4	114.75 g
Onça	Ounce	8 oitavas	1/16	28.6875 g
Oitava	Dram	3 escrópulos	1/128	3.5859 g
Escrópulo	Scruple	24 grãos	1/384	1.1953 g
Grão	Grain		1/9216	0.0498 g

== Volume units ==
Portuguese name	English name	Subdivides in	Equivalence in canadas	Metric equivalence
Tonel	Tun	2 pipas	600	840 L
Pipa	Pipe	25 almudes	300	420 L
Almude	Modius	2 potes	12	16.8 L
Pote	Pot	6 canadas	6	8.4 L
Canada	Quart	4 quartilhos	1	1.4 L
Quartilho	Pint	2 meios quartilhos	1/4	0.35 L
Meio quartilho	Half-Pint		1/8	0.175 L

== See also ==
- Spanish customary units
