= System of units of measurement =

Collection of units of measurement and rules relating them to each other

A system of units of measurement, also known as a system of units or system of measurement, is a collection of units of measurement (Note: An unit as a predefined magnitude of a physical quantity, like meter for length, to present any magnitude of the quantity in numbers, like 10 meters as 10 times longer length than 1 meter.) and rules relating them to each other. Systems of measurement have historically been important, regulated and defined for the purposes of science and commerce. Instances in use include the International System of Units or SI (the modern form of the metric system), the British imperial system, and the United States customary system.

== History ==
In antiquity, systems of measurement were defined locally: the different units might be defined independently according to the length of a king's thumb or the size of his foot, the length of stride, the length of arm, or maybe the weight of water in a keg of specific size, perhaps itself defined in hands and knuckles. The unifying characteristic is that there was some definition based on some standard. Eventually cubits and strides gave way to "customary units" to meet the needs of merchants and scientists.

The preference for a more universal and consistent system only gradually spread with the growth of international trade and science. Changing a measurement system has costs in the near term, which often results in resistance to such a change. The substantial benefit of conversion to a more rational and internationally consistent system of measurement has been recognized and promoted by scientists, engineers, businesses and politicians, and has resulted in most of the world adopting a commonly agreed metric system.

The French Revolution gave rise to the metric system, and this has spread around the world, replacing most customary units of measure. In most systems, length (distance), mass, and time are base quantities.

Later, science developments showed that an electromagnetic quantity such as electric charge or electric current could be added to extend the set of base quantities. Gaussian units have only length, mass, and time as base quantities, with no separate electromagnetic dimension. Other quantities, such as power and speed, are derived from the base quantities: for example, speed is distance per unit time. Historically, a wide range of units was used for the same type of quantity. In different contexts length was measured in inches, feet, yards, fathoms, rods, chains, furlongs, miles, nautical miles, stadia, leagues, with conversion factors that were not based on power of ten.

In the metric system and other recent systems, underlying relationships between quantities, as expressed by formulae of physics such as Newton's laws of motion, is used to select a small number of base quantities for which a unit is defined for each, from which all other units may be derived. Secondary units (multiples and submultiples) are derived from these base and derived units by multiplying by powers of ten. For example, where the unit of length is the metre; a distance of 1 metre is 1,000 millimetres, or 0.001 kilometres.

=== Current practice ===
Metrication is complete or nearly complete in most countries.

However, US customary units remain heavily used in the United States and to some degree in Liberia. Traditional Burmese units of measurement are used in Burma, with partial transition to the metric system. U.S. units are used in limited contexts in Canada due to the large volume of trade with the U.S. There is also considerable use of imperial weights and measures, despite de jure Canadian conversion to metric.

A number of other jurisdictions have laws mandating or permitting other systems of measurement in some or all contexts, such as the United Kingdom whose road signage legislation, for instance, only allows distance signs displaying imperial units (miles or yards) or Hong Kong.

In the United States, metric units are virtually always used in science, frequently in the military, partially in industry. U.S. customary units are primarily used in U.S. households, though some metric redefinitions (such as the teaspoon and the tablespoon) have quietly become ubiquitous. In nutrition, the FDA requires metric definitions of customary units to be used on packaging. In retail contexts, the liter is a commonly used unit for volume, especially on bottles of beverages, and milligrams, rather than grains, are used for medications.

Some other non-SI units are still in international use, such as nautical miles and knots in aviation and shipping, and feet for aircraft altitude.

== Metric system ==
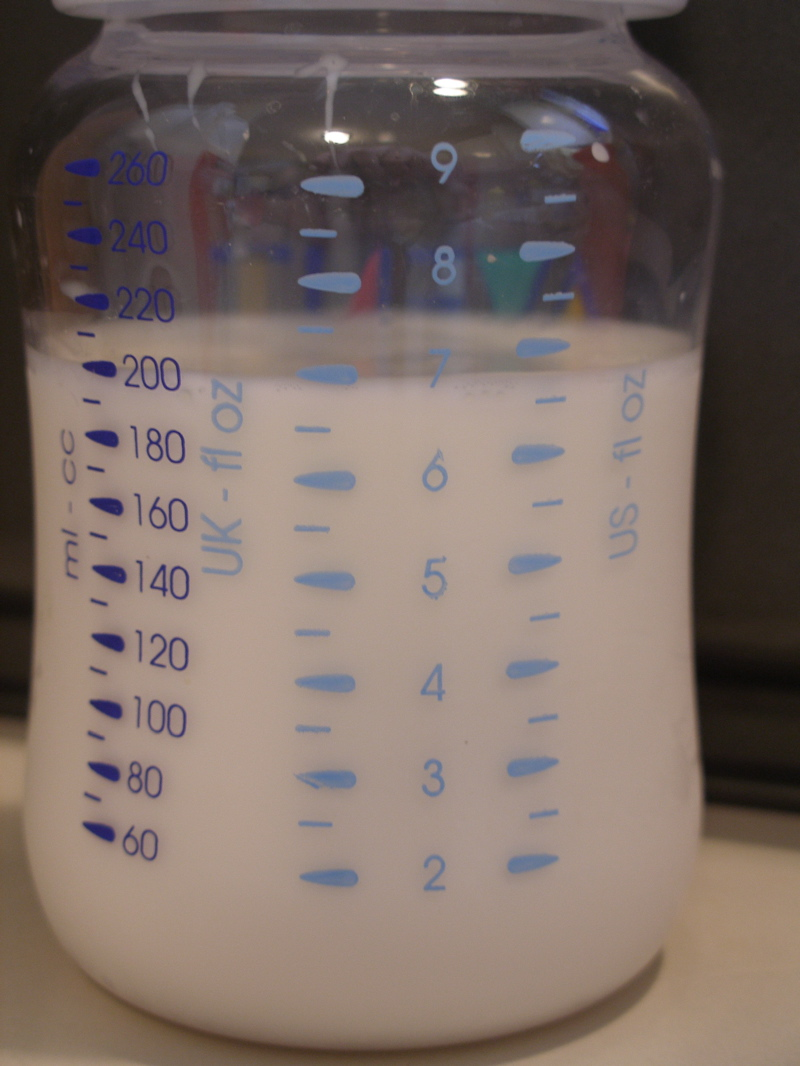
A baby bottle that measures in three measurement systems—metric, imperial (UK), and US customary

Metric systems of units have evolved since the adoption of the first well-defined system in France in 1795. During this evolution the use of these systems has spread throughout the world, first to non-English-speaking countries, and then to English speaking countries.

Multiples and submultiples of metric units are related by powers of ten and their names are formed with prefixes. This relationship is compatible with the decimal system of numbers and it contributes greatly to the convenience of metric units.

In the early metric system there were two base units, the metre for length and the gram for mass. The other units of length and mass, and all units of area, volume, and derived units such as density were derived from these two base units.

Mesures usuelles (French for customary measures) were a system of measurement introduced as a compromise between the metric system and traditional measurements. It was used in France from 1812 to 1839.

A number of variations on the metric system have been in use. These include gravitational systems, the centimetre–gram–second systems (cgs) useful in science, the metre–tonne–second system (mts) once used in the USSR and the metre–kilogram–second system (mks). In some engineering fields, like computer-aided design, millimetre–gram–second (mmgs) is also used.

The current international standard for the metric system is the International System of Units (Système international d'unités or SI). It is a system in which all units can be expressed in terms of seven units. The units that serve as the SI base units are the metre, kilogram, second, ampere, kelvin, mole, and candela.

== British imperial and US customary units ==
Both British imperial units and US customary units derive from earlier English units. Imperial units were mostly used in the former British Empire and the British Commonwealth, but in all these countries they have been largely supplanted by the metric system. They are still used for some applications in the United Kingdom but have been mostly replaced by the metric system in commercial, scientific, and industrial applications. US customary units, however, are still the main system of measurement in the United States. While some steps towards metrication have been made (mainly in the late 1960s and early 1970s), the customary units have a strong hold due to the vast industrial infrastructure and commercial development.

While British imperial and US customary systems are closely related, there are a number of differences between them. Units of length and area (the inch, foot, yard, mile, etc.) have been identical since the adoption of the International Yard and Pound Agreement; however, the US and, formerly, India retained older definitions for surveying purposes. This gave rise to the US survey foot, for instance. The avoirdupois units of mass and weight differ for units larger than a pound (lb). The British imperial system uses a stone of 14 lb, a long hundredweight of 112 lb and a long ton of 2,240 lb. The stone is not a measurement of weight used in the US. The US customary system uses the short hundredweight of 100 lb and short ton of 2,000 lb.

Where these systems most notably differ is in their units of volume. An imperial fluid ounce of 28.4130625 ml is 3.924% smaller than the US fluid ounce (fl oz) of 29.5735295625 millilitres (ml). However, as there are 16 US fl oz to a US pint and 20 imp fl oz to an imperial pint, the imperial pint is 20.095% larger than a US pint, and the same is true for gills, quarts, and gallons: six US gallons (22.712470704 L) is only 0.08% less than five imperial gallons (22.73045 L).

The avoirdupois system served as the general system of mass and weight. In addition to this, there are the troy and the apothecaries' systems. Troy weight was customarily used for precious metals, black powder, and gemstones. The troy ounce is the only unit of the system in current use; it is used for precious metals. Although the troy ounce is larger than its avoirdupois equivalent, the pound is smaller. The obsolete troy pound was divided into 12 ounces, rather than the 16 ounces per pound of the avoirdupois system. The apothecaries' system was traditionally used in pharmacology, but has now been replaced by the metric system; it shared the same pound and ounce as the troy system but with different further subdivisions.

== Natural units ==
Natural units are units of measurement defined in terms of universal physical constants in such a manner that selected physical constants take on the numerical value of one when expressed in terms of those units. Natural units are so named because their definition relies on only properties of nature and not on any human construct. Varying systems of natural units are possible, depending on the choice of constants used.

Some examples are as follows:

- Geometrized unit systems are useful in relativistic physics. In these systems, speed of light and the gravitational constant are among the constants chosen.
- Planck units is system of geometrized units in which the reduced Planck constant is included in the list of defining constants. It is based on only properties of free space rather than of any object or particle.
- Stoney units is a system of geometrized units in which the Coulomb constant and the elementary charge are included.
- Atomic units are a system of units used in atomic physics, particularly for describing the properties of electrons. The atomic units have been chosen to use several constants relating to the electron: the electron mass, the elementary charge, the Coulomb constant and the reduced Planck constant. The unit of energy in this system is the total energy of the electron in the Bohr atom and called the Hartree energy. The unit of length is the Bohr radius.

== Units of currency ==
A unit of measurement that applies to money is called a unit of account in economics and unit of measure in accounting. This is normally a currency issued by a country or a fraction thereof; for instance, the US dollar and US cent (1/100 of a dollar), or the euro and euro cent.

ISO 4217 is the international standard describing three letter codes (also known as the currency code) to define the names of currencies established by the International Organization for Standardization (ISO).

== Historical systems of measurement ==
Throughout history, many official systems of measurement have been used. While no longer in official use, some of these customary systems are occasionally used in day-to-day life, for instance in cooking.

=== Africa ===
- Algerian
- Egyptian
- Ethiopian
- Eritrean
- Guinean
- Libyan
- Malagasy
- Mauritian
- Moroccan
- Seychellois
- Somalian
- Tunisian
- South African
- Tanzanian

=== Asia ===
- Arabic
- Afghan
- Cambodian
- Chinese
  - Hong Kong
- Hebrew (Biblical and Talmudic)
- Indian
- Indonesian
- Japanese
- Korean
- Omani
- Pakistani
- Philippine
- Mesopotamian
- Persian
- Singaporean
- Sri Lankan
- Syrian
- Taiwanese
- Tamil
- Thai
- Vietnamese
- Nepalese

Still in use:

- Myanmar

=== Europe ===
- Ancient Greek
- Belgian
- Byzantine
- Czech
- Cypriot
- Danish
- Dutch
- English
- Estonian
- Finnish
- French (now)
- French (to 1795)
- German
- Greek
- Hungary
- Icelandic
- Irish
- Italian
- Latvian
- Luxembourgian
- Maltese
- Norwegian
- Polish
- Portuguese
- Roman
- Romanian
- Russian
- Scottish
- Serbian
- Slovak
- Spanish
- Swedish
- Switzerland
- Turkish
- Tatar
- Welsh

=== North America ===
- Costa Rican
- Cuban
- Haitian
- Honduran
- Mexico
- Nicaraguan
- Puerto Rican

=== South America ===
- Argentine
- Bolivian
- Brazilian
- Chilean
- Colombian
- Paraguayan
- Peruvian
- Uruguayan
- Venezuelan

== Ancient ==
- Arabic
- Biblical and Talmudic
- Egyptian
- Greek
- Hindu (time)
- Indian
- Mesopotamian
- Persian
- Roman

== See also ==
- Conversion of units
- History of the metric system
- ISO 31
- Level of measurement
- List of non-coherent units of measurement
- Medieval weights and measures
- Megalithic yard
- Petrograd Standard
- Pseudoscientific metrology
- Unified Code for Units of Measure
- Weights and measures

== Bibliography ==
- Tavernor, Robert (2007), Smoot's Ear: The Measure of Humanity, ISBN 0-300-12492-9
