= Medieval weights and measures =

Measuring in various degrees during the Middle Ages

The following systems arose from earlier systems, and in many cases utilise parts of much older systems. For the most part they were used to varying degrees in the Middle Ages and surrounding time periods. Some of these systems found their way into later systems, such as the Imperial system and even SI.

== English system ==
Before Roman units were reintroduced in 1066 by William the Conqueror, there was an Anglo-Saxon (Germanic) system of measure, of which few details survive. It probably included the following units of length:

- fingerbreadth or digit
- inch
- ell or cubit
- foot
- perch, used variously to measure length or area
- acre and acre's breadth
- furlong
- mile

The best-attested of these is the perch which was approximately 5.03 m or 16 1/2 feet. It remained in use until the twentieth century.

Later development of the English system continued in 1215 in the Magna Carta. Standards were renewed in 1496, 1588 and 1758.

Some of these units would go on to be used in later Imperial units and in the US system.

== Danish system ==
From May 1, 1683, King Christian V of Denmark introduced an office to oversee weights and measures, a justervæsen, to be led by Ole Rømer. The definition of the alen was set to 2 Rhine feet. Rømer later discovered that differing standards for the Rhine foot existed, and in 1698 an iron Copenhagen standard was made. A pendulum definition for the foot was first suggested by Rømer, introduced in 1820, and changed in 1835. The metric system was introduced in 1907.

=== Length ===
- skrupel – Scruple, 1/12 linie
- linie – Line, 1/12 tomme
- tomme – Inch, 1/12 fod
- palme – Palm, for circumference, 8.86 cm
- kvarter – Quarter, 1/4 alen
- fod – Defined as a Rheinfuss 31.407 cm from 1683, before that 31.41 cm with variations.
- alen – Forearm, 2 fod
- mil – Danish mile. Towards the end of the 17th century, Ole Rømer connected the mile to the circumference of the earth, and defined it as 12000 alen. This definition was adopted in 1816 as the Prussian Meile. The coordinated definition from 1835 was 7.532 km. Earlier, there were many variants, the most commonplace the Sjællandsk miil of 17600 fod or 11.130 km.

=== Volume ===
- potte – Pot, from 1603 1/32 foot^{3}
- smørtønde – Barrel of butter, defined as 136 potter from 1683
- korntønde – Barrel of corn, defined as 144 potter from 1683

=== Weight ===
- pund – Pound, from 1683 the weight of 1/62 fot^{3} of water, 499.75 g

=== Miscellaneous ===
- dusin – 12
- snes – 20
- gross – 144

== Dutch system ==
The Dutch system was not standardised until Napoleon introduced the metric system. Different towns used measures with the same names but differing sizes.

Some common measures:

=== Length ===
- duim –2.54 cm
- kleine palm –3 cm
- grote palm –9.6 cm, after 1820, 10 cm
- voet –12 duim = abt. 29.54 cm, many local variations
- el – about 70 cm

=== Volume ===
- Pint – 0.6 L

=== Weight ===
- Ons, Once – 1/16 pond = 30.881 g
- Pond (Amsterdam) – 494.09 g (other ponds were also in use)
- Scheepslast – 4000 Amsterdam pond = 1976.4 kg = 2.1786 short tons

== Finnish system ==
In Finland, approximate measures derived from body parts and were used for a long time, some being later standardised for the purpose of commerce. Some Swedish, and later some Russian units have also been used.

=== Length ===
- vaaksa – The distance between the tips of little finger and thumb, when the fingers are fully extended.
- kyynärä – c. 60 cm – The distance from the elbow to the fingertips.
- syli – fathom, c. 180 cm – The distance between the fingertips of both hands when the arms are raised horizontally on the sides.
- virsta – 2672 m (Swedish), 1068.84 m (Russian)
- poronkusema – c. 7.5 km – The distance a reindeer walks between two spots it urinates on. This unit originates from Lapland (i.e. Sápmi).
- peninkulma – 10.67 km – The distance a barking dog can be heard in still air.

=== Area ===
- tynnyrinala – 4936.5 m^{2} – The area (of field) that could be sown with one barrel of grain.

=== Volume ===
- kannu – 2.6172 L
- kappa – 5.4961 L

=== Weight ===
- leiviskä – 8.5004 kg

=== Miscellaneous ===
- kortteli – 148 mm (length) or 0.327 L (volume)

== French system ==
In France, again, there were many local variants. For instance, the lieue could vary from 3.268 km in Beauce to 5.849 km in Provence. Between 1812 and 1839, many of the traditional units continued in metrified adaptations as the mesures usuelles.

In Paris, the redefinition in terms of metric units made 1 m = 443.296 ligne = 3 pied 11.296 ligne.

In Quebec, the surveys in French units were converted using the relationship 1 pied (of the French variety; the same word is used for English feet as well) = 12.789 inches (of English origin). Thus a square arpent was 5299296.0804 in^{2} or about 36,801 ft^{2} or 0.8448 acre.

There were many local variations; the metric conversions below apply to the Quebec and Paris definitions.

=== Length ===
- ligne – 1/12 pouce 2.2558 mm
- pouce – Inch, 1/12 pied 27.070 mm
- pied – Foot, varied through times, the Paris pied de roi is 324.84 mm. Used by Coulomb in manuscripts relating to the inverse square law of electrostatic repulsion. Isaac Newton used the "Paris foot" in his Philosophiae Naturalis Principia Mathematica.
- 1 Roman cubit = 444 mm (so 10000 Roman cubits = 4.44 km, a closer approximation to 1/25 degree)
- toise – Fathom, 6 pieds. Originally introduced by Charlemagne in 790, it is now considered to be 1.949 m.
- arpent – 30 toises or 180 pieds, 58.471 m
- lieue de poste – Legal league, 2000 toises, 3.898 km
- lieue metrique – Metric system adaptation, 4.000 km
- lieue commune – French land league, 4.452 km, 1/25 Equatorial degree
- lieue marine – French (late) sea league, 5.556 km, 3 nautical miles.

=== Area ===
- arpent – square arpent, 900 square toises, 3419 m^{2}

=== Volume ===
- litron – 0.831018 litres

=== Weight ===
- livre – 0.4895 kg
- quintal – 100 livres, 48.95 kg

== German system ==
Up to the introduction of the metric system, almost every town in Germany had their own definitions. It is said that by 1810, in Baden alone, there were 112 different Ellen.

=== Length ===
- Linie – Line, usually 1/12 inch, but also 1/10.
- Zoll – Inch, usually 1/12 foot, but also 1/10.
- Fuss – Foot, varied between 23.51 cm in Wesel and 40.83 cm in Trier.
- Rheinfuss – Rhine foot, used in the North, 31.387 cm
- Elle – Ell / cubit, distance between elbow and finger tip. In the North, often 2 feet, In Prussia 17/8 feet, in the South variable, often 2 1/2 feet. The smallest known German elle is 402.8 mm, the longest 811 mm.
- Klafter – Fathom, usually 6 feet. Regional changes from 1.75 m in Baden to 3 m in Switzerland.
- Rute – Rod, Roman origin, use as land measure. Very differing definitions, 10, 12, 14, 15, 18 or 20 feet, varied between approx. 3 and 5 m.
- Wegstunde – 'Way's hour', one hours travel (by foot), used up to the 18th century. In Germany 1/2 Meile or 3.71 km, in Switzerland 16000 feet or 4.8 km
- Meile – 'Mile', a German geographische Meile or Gemeine deutsche Meile was defined as 7.420 km, but there were a wealth of variants:
  - Anhalt – 7532 m
  - Baden – 8889 m before 1810, 8944 m before 1871, 8000 m thereafter
  - Böhmen – 7498 m
  - Brabant – 5000 m
  - Bayern – 7415 m, connected to a 1/15 Equatorial degree as 25406 Bavarian feet.
  - Hamburg (Prussia) – In 1816, king Frederick William III of Prussia adopted the Danish mile at 7532 m, or 24000 Prussian feet. Also known as Landmeile.
  - Hessen-Kassel – 9206 m
  - Lippe-Detmold – 9264 m
  - Oldenburg – 9894 m
  - Osnabrück – 5160 m
  - Pfalz – 4630 m
  - Rheinland – 4119 m
  - Sachsen – Postmeile, 7500 m. Also 9062 m or 32000 feet in Dresden
  - Schleswig-Holstein – 8803 m
  - Westfalen – 11100 m, but also 9250 m
  - Vienna – 7586 m
  - Wiesbaden – 1000 m
  - Württemberg – 7449 m
- Reichsmeile – 'Imperial / (The) Realm's mile', new mile when the metric system was introduced, 7.5 km. Prohibited by law in 1908.
- Schainos – Uncertain use, between 10 and 12 km,
- Stadion – Uncertain use

== Norwegian system ==
Before 1541, there were no common definition for length measures in Norway, and local variants flourished. In 1541, an alen in Denmark and Norway was defined by law to be the Sjælland alen. Subsequently, the alen was defined by law as 2 Rhine feet from 1683. From 1824, the basic unit was defined as a fot being derived from astronomy as the length of a one-second pendulum times 12/38 at a latitude of 45°. The metric system was introduced in 1887.

=== Length ===
- skrupel – Scruple, 1/12 linje or approx. 0.18 mm.
- linje – Line, 1/12 tomme or approx. 2.18 mm
- tomme – Thumb (inch), 1/12 fot, approx. 2.61 cm. This unit was commonly used for measuring timber until the 1970s. Nowadays, the word refers invariably to the Imperial inch, 2.54 cm.
- kvarter – Quarter, 1/4 alen.
- fot – Foot, 1/2 alen. From 1824, 31.374 cm.
- alen – Forearm, 62.748 cm from 1824, 62.75 cm from 1683, 63.26 cm from 1541. Before that, local variants.
- favn – Fathom (pl. favner), 1.882 m.
- stang – Rod, 5 alen or 3.1375 m
- lås – 28.2 m
- steinkast – Stone's throw, perhaps 25 favner, used to this day as a very approximate measure.
- fjerdingsvei – Quarter mile, alt. fjerding, 1/4 mil, i.e. 2.82375 km.
- rast –Lit. "rest", the old name of the mil. A suitable distance between rests when walking. Believed to be approx. 9 km before 1541.
- mil – Norwegian mile, spelled miil prior to 1862, 18000 alen or 11.295 km. Before 1683, a mil was defined as 17600 alen or 11.13 km. The unit survives to this day, but in a metric 10 km adaptation
- landmil – Old land-mile, 11.824 km.

=== Area ===
- kvadrat rode – Square stang, 9.84 m^{2}
- mål – 100 kvadrat rode, 984 m^{2}. The unit survives to this day, but in a metric 1000 m^{2} adaptation.
- tønneland – "Barrel of land", 4 mål

=== Volume ===
- skjeppe – 1/8 tønne, i.e. 17.4 L.
- tønne – Barrel, 139.2 L.
- favn – 1 alen by 1 favn by 1 favn, 2.232 m^{3}, used for measuring firewood to this day.

=== Weight ===
- ort – 0.9735 g
- merke – From Roman pound, (pl. merker), 249.4 g, 218.7 g before 1683.
- pund – Pound, alt. skålpund, 2 merker 0.4984 kg, was 0.46665 kg before 1683
- bismerpund – 12 pund, 5.9808 kg
- vette – 28.8 mark or 6.2985 kg.
- laup – alt. 'spann', used for butter, 17.93 kg (approx. 16.2 L).
- våg – 1/8 skippund, 17.9424 kg.
- skippund – Ships pound, 159.488 kg. Was defined as 151.16 kg in 1270.

=== Nautical ===
- favn – Fathom (pl. favner), 3 alen, 1.88 m
- kabellengde – cable length, 100 favner, 185.2 m
- kvartmil – Quarter mile, 10 kabellengder, 1852 m
- sjømil – Sea mile, 4 kvartmil, 7408 m, defined as 1/15 Equatorial degree.

=== Monetary ===
- skilling – Shilling, see riksdaler and speciedaler.
- ort – See riksdaler and speciedaler.
- riksdaler – Until 1813, Norwegian thaler. 1 riksdaler is 4 ort or 6 mark or 96 skilling.
- speciedaler – Since 1816. 1 speciedaler is 5 ort or 120 skilling. From 1876, 1 speciedaler is 4 kroner (Norwegian crown, NOK).

=== Miscellaneous ===
- tylft – 12, also dusin
- snes – 20
- stort hundre – Large hundred, 120
- gross – 144

== Portuguese system ==
The various systems of weights and measures used in Portugal until the 19th century combine remote Roman influences with medieval influences from northern Europe and Islam.The Roman and northern European influences were more present in the north. The Islamic influence was more present in the south of the country. Fundamental units like the alqueire and the almude were imported by the northwest of Portugal in the 11th century, before the country became independent of León.

The gradual long-term process of standardization of weights and measures in Portugal is documented mainly since the mid-14th century. In 1352, municipalities requested standardization in a parliament meeting (Cortes). In response, Afonso IV decided to set the alna (aune) of Lisbon as standard for the linear measures used for color fabrics across the country. A few years later, Pedro I carried a more comprehensive reform, as documented in the parliament meeting of 1361: the arrátel folforinho of Santarém should be used for weighing meat; the arroba of Lisbon would be the standard for the remaining weights; cereals should be measured by the alqueire of Santarém; the almude of Lisbon should be used for wine. With advances, adjustments and setbacks, this framework predominated until the end of the 15th century.

Further information: Portuguese customary units.

== Romanian system ==
The measures of the old Romanian system varied greatly not only between the three Romanian states (Wallachia, Moldavia, Transylvania), but sometimes also inside the same country. The origin of some of the measures are the Latin (such as iugăr unit), Slavic (such as vadră unit) and Greek (such as dram unit) and Turkish (such as palmac unit) systems.

This system is no longer in use since the adoption of the metric system in 1864.

=== Length ===
- Cot (cubit) – 0.664 cm (Moldavia); 0.637 cm (Wallachia)
- Deget (finger) – the width of a finger
- Palmac – 3.48 cm (Moldavia)
- Lat de palmă (palm width) – 1/2 palmă
- Palmă (palm) – 1/8 of a stânjen
- Picior (foot) – 1/6 of a stânjen
- Pas mic (small step) – 4 palme (Wallachia)
- Pas mare (large step) – 6 palme (Wallachia; Moldavia)
- Stânjen – 2 m (approximately)
- Prăjină – 3 stânjeni
- Funie (rope) – 20 – 120 m (depending on the place)
- Verstă – 1067 m
- Leghe (league) – 4.444 km;
- Poştă – 8 – 20 km (depending on the country)

=== Area ===
- Prăjină – 180–210 m^{2}
- Feredelă – 1/4 pogon
- Pogon – 50000 m^{2}
- Iugăr – the area ploughed in one day by two oxen – 7166 m^{2} (Transylvania in 1517); 5700 m^{2} or 1600 square stânjeni (later)
- Falce – 14300 m^{2}

=== Volume ===
- Litră – 1/4 oca
- Oca – (pl. ocale), 1.5 litres (Moldavia); 1.25 litres (Wallachia)
- Pintă – 3.394 litres (Transylvania)
- Vadră – (pl. vedre, in Transylvania Tină), 10 ocale; 12.88 litres (Wallachia); 15 litres (Moldavia)
- Baniţă – 21.5 litres (Moldavia); 33.96 litres (Wallachia)
- Chiup – 30–40 litres (a chiup was a large clay pot for liquids)
- Obroc mic – 22 ocale
- Obroc mare – 44 ocale
- Merţă – 110–120 ocale (Moldavia); 22.5 litres (Transylvania)
- Giumătate – 80–100 vedre (poloboc)
- Feredelă – 1/4 bucket (Transylvania)
- Câblă – A bucket of wheat

=== Weight ===
- Dram – 3.18–3.25 g sau 3.22–3.80 cm^{3}
- Font – 0.5 kg (Transylvania)

== Russian and Tatar systems ==
See:

- Obsolete Russian weights and measures
- Obsolete Tatar weights and measures

== Scottish system ==
=== Length ===
- inch – 2.554 cm
- foot – 12 inches, 30.645 cm
- ell – Elbow, 37 Scots inches. 94.5 cm
- fall – 18 Scots feet
- mile – 320 falls, 1814.2 m

== Spanish system ==
There were several variants. The Castilian is shown.

=== Length ===
- punto – Point, 1/12 línea
- línea – Line, 1/12 pulgada
- pulgada – Inch, 1/36 vara, 0.02322 m
- pie – Foot, 12 pulgadas, 0.2786 m
- vara – Yard, 0.8359 m
- paso – Pace, 60 pulgadas
- legua – League, 5000 varas, approx 4.2 km

== Swedish system ==
In Sweden, a common system for weights and measures was introduced by law in 1665. Before that, there were a number of local variants. The system was slightly revised in 1735. In 1855, a decimal reform was instituted that defined a new Swedish inch as 1/10 foot. It did not last long, because the metric system was subsequently introduced in 1889. Up to the middle of the 19th century there was a death penalty for falsifying weights or measures.

=== Length ===
- linje – Line, after 1863 1/10 tum, 2.96 mm. Before that, 1/12 tum or 2.06 mm.
- tum – Thumb (inch), after 1863 1/10 fot, 2.96 cm. Before that, 1/12 fot or 2.474 cm.
- tvärhand – Hand, 4 inches.
- kvarter – Quarter, 1/4 aln
- fot – Foot, 1/2 aln. Before 1863, the Stockholm fot was the commonly accepted unit, at 29.69 cm.
- aln – Forearm (pl. alnar). After 1863, 59.37 cm. Before that, from 1605, 59.38 cm as defined by king Carl IX of Sweden in Norrköping 1604 based on the Rydaholmsalnen.
- famn – Fathom, 3 alnar.
- stång – 16 fot, for land measurement
- ref – 160 fot, for land measurement, was 100 fot after 1855.
- stenkast – Stone's throw, approx 50 m, used to this day as an approximate measure.
- fjärdingsväg – 1/4 mil
- skogsmil – Also rast, distance between rests in the woods, approx 5 km.
- nymil – New mile from 1889, 10 km exactly. Commonly used to this day, normally referred to as mil.
- mil – Mile, also lantmil. From 1699, defined as a unity mile of 18000 aln or 10.69 km. The unified mile was meant to define the suitable distance between inns.
- kyndemil – The distance a torch will last, approx 16 km

=== Area ===
- kvadratfamn – square famn or 3.17 m^{2}
- kannaland – 1000 fot^{2}, or 88.15 m^{2}
- kappland – 154.3 m^{2}.
- spannland – 16 kappland
- tunneland – 2 spannland
- kvadratmil – square mil, 36 million square famnar, from 1739.

=== Volume ===
- pot – Pot (pl pottor), 0.966 L
- tunna – 2 spann
- ankare – Liquid measure, 39.26 L
- ohm – (alt. åm), 155 pottor
- skogsfamn – for firewood, 2.83 m^{3} = 6×6×3 fot
- storfamn – for firewood, 3.77 m^{3} = 8×6×3 fot
- kubikfamn – 5.65 m^{3} = 6×6×6 fot

=== Weight ===
- ort – 4.2508 g
- mark – 1/2 skålpund or 212.5 g. Used from the Viking era, when it was approx 203 g.
- skålpund – Pound, 0.42507 kg
- bismerpund – 12 skålpund, 5.101 kg.
- lispund – 20 skålpund
- skeppspund – Ships pound, 20 lispund or 170.03 kg.

=== Nautical ===
- kabellängd – Initially 100 famnar or 178 m. Later, a distansminut or 1/10 nautical mile.
- kvartmil – Quarter mile, 1852 m, identical to nautical mile.
- sjömil – Sea mile, 4 kvartmil, 7408 m

=== Monetary ===
- skilling – From 1776, 1/48 riksdaler
- õre – From 1534, 1/8 mark. Replaced by the skilling, but from 1855 reintroduced as 1/100 riksdaler.
- mark – From 1534, 1/3 daler. From 1604, 1/4 daler.
- daler – From 1534, Swedish thaler. From 1873, replaced by the krona (Swedish crown, SEK).
- riksdaler – From 1624, 1 1/2 daler, from 1681 2 daler, from 1715 3 daler, from 1776 6 daler

== Turkish system ==
=== Length ===
Measure	Metric
merhale	45480 m.
fersah	5685 m.
berid	227 m.
kulaç	1.89 m.
arşın	0.68 m.
endaze	0.65 m.
rubu	0.085 m.
hat	0.00263 m.

- Mimar arşını = 77 cm = 24 Parmak
- 12 Parmak = 1 Kadem
- 1 Kadem = 36,6666 cm
- 1 Parmak= 3,1573 cm
- 1 Hat = 0,2631 cm
- 1 Nokta = 0,0219 cm
- Çarşı Arşını
- 1 çarşı arşını = 68 cm=8 rubu
- 1 rubu=8,5 cm=2 kerah
- 1 kerah=4,25 cm

=== Area ===
Measure	Metric
dönüm (new)	2720 m²
dönüm (old)	919 m²

- 1 arşın (zirai)² = 0,57417 m² = 4 ayak²
- 1 dönüm (yeni) = 2500 m²
- 1 dönüm (büyük) = 2720 m²
- 1 dönüm (atik) = 4 evlek = 1600 zirai² = 918,672 m² (bir kenarı 40 arşın (zirai) olan kare)
- 1 atik evlek = 400 arşın² = 229,668 m²
- 1 yeni evlek = 100 m²
- 1 cerip = 3600 zirai² = 2067,012 m²
- 1 ayak² = 144 parmak² = 0,14354 m²
- 1 parmak² = 144 hat² = 0,00099751 m²
- 1 hat² = 144 nokta² = 0,000006927 m² " 1 çarşı arşın² = 0,46240 m²
- 1 urup² = 0,007225 m²
- 1 kirah² = 0,0018062 m²
- 1 endâze² = 0,422500 m²
- 1 urup² = 0,0066015 m²
- 1 ar=100 m²

=== Volume ===
- kile (İstanbul) 0,037 m³ = 37 lt.
- şinik 0,00925 m³ = 9,25 lt.

=== Weight ===
Measure	Metric
çeki	225,789 kg.
kantar	56,449 kg.
batman	7,697 kg.
okka	1,282 kg.
miskal	1 miskal = 1,5 dirhem
dirhem	0,003207 kg. = 3,207 gr.
kırat	0,0002004 kg. = 0,2004 gr.

==== Okka ====
- 1 tonilato = 4 çeki
- 1 çeki = 4 kantar
- 1 kantar = 44 okka(kıyye)
- 1 batman = 6 okka(kıyye)
- 1 okka(kıyye) = 400 dirhem

==== Dirhem ====
- 1 dirhem = 4 dönük
- 1 dönük = 4 kırat
- 1 kırat = 4 bakray
- 1 bakray = 4 fitil
- 1 fitil = 2 nekir
- 1 nekir = 2 kıtmir
- 1 kıtmir = 2 zerre

=== Time ===
- Menzil = 80 second

=== Ottoman units ===
The Ottoman Empire (1299–1923), the predecessor of modern Turkey was one of the 17 signatories of the Metre Convention in 1875. For 58 years both the international and the traditional units were in use, but after the proclamation of the Turkish Republic, the traditional units became obsolete. In 1931 by Act No. 1782, international units became compulsory and the traditional units were banned from use starting 1 January 1933.

==== Length ====
Local name		In English	Equivalence	In modern units
nokta	نقطه	point		0.219 mm (0.0086 in)
hat	خط	line	12 nokta	2.63 mm (0.104 in)
parmak	پرمق	finger	12 hat	31.57 mm (1.243 in)
kerrab or kirab				42.5 mm (1.67 in)
rubu or urup			2 kerrab	85 mm (3.3 in)
ayak or kadem	آیاق	foot	12 parmak	378.87 mm (1.2430 ft)
endaze		ell		650 mm (2.13 ft)
arşın	آرشين or آرشون	ell		68 cm (2.23 ft)
zirai		agricultural/yard	2 ayak	757.74 mm (2.4860 ft)
kulaç		fathom		1.8288 m (6.000 ft)
berid or menzil	بريد or منزل	range	600 ayak	227 m (745 ft)
eski mil		nautical mile	5,000 ayak	1,894.35 m (1.02287 nmi)
fersah	فرسخ	league	3 eski mil	5,685 m (3.532 mi)
merhale	مرحلة	stage, phase	200 berid	45.48 km (28.26 mi)

==== Area ====
Local name		In English	In modern units
eski dönüm	اسكی دونوم	old dunam	919 m^{2} (9,890 sq ft)
büyük dönüm	بیوك دونوم	big dunam	2,720 m^{2} (29,300 sq ft)

==== Volume ====
Local name		In English	Equivalence	In modern units
şinik		peck		9.25 L (2.44 US gal)
kile (Istanbul)	كيله	bushel	4 şinik	37 L (9.8 US gal)

==== Weight ====
Local name		In English	Equivalence	In modern units
kırat	قيراط	carat		0.2004 g (1.002 carats)
dirhem	درهم	(Turkish) dram	16 kırat	3.207 g (0.1131 oz)
okka	اوقه	oka	400 dirhem	1.282 kg (2.83 lb)
miskal	مثقال		1.5 dirhem	4.25 g (0.150 oz)
batman	بطمان		6 okka	7.697 kg (16.97 lb)
kantar	قنطار	weighbridge		56.449 kg (124.45 lb)
çeki	چكی		4 kantar	225.789 kg (497.78 lb)

==== Volumetric flow ====
Local name		In modern units
hilal	هلال	0.6526 L/min
çuvaldız		1.125 L/min
masura		4.5 L/min
kamış	قامش	9 L/min
lüle	لوله	36 L/min

==== Time ====
The traditional calendar of the Ottoman Empire was, like in most Muslim countries, the Islamic calendar. Its era begins from the Hijra in 622 CE and each year is calculated using the 12 Arabian lunar months, approximately eleven days shorter than a Gregorian solar year. In 1839, however, a second calendar was put in use for official matters. The new calendar, which was called the Rumi also began by 622, but with an annual duration equal to a solar year after 1840. In modern Turkey, the Gregorian calendar was adopted as the legal calendar, beginning by the end of 1925. But the Islamic calendar is still used when discussing dates in an Islamic context.

== See also ==
- Mesures usuelles
- Weights and measures
