= Ottoman units of measurement =

Measurement units used in the Ottoman Empire

The list of traditional Turkish units of measurement, a.k.a. Ottoman units of measurement, is given below.

== History ==
The Ottoman Empire (1299–1923), the predecessor of modern Turkey was one of the 17 signatories of the Metre Convention in 1875. For 58 years both the international and the traditional units were in use, but after the proclamation of the Turkish Republic, the traditional units became obsolete. In 1931 by Act No. 1782, international units became compulsory and the traditional units were banned from use starting 1 January 1933.

== List of units ==
=== Length ===
Local name		In English	Equivalence	In modern units
nokta	نقطه	point		0.219 mm (0.0086 in)
hat	خط	line	12 nokta	2.63 mm (0.104 in)
parmak	پرمق	finger	12 hat	31.57 mm (1.243 in)
kerrab or kirab				42.5 mm (1.67 in)
rubu or urup			2 kerrab	85 mm (3.3 in)
ayak or kadem	آیاق	foot	12 parmak	378.87 mm (1.2430 ft)
endaze		ell		650 mm (2.13 ft)
arşın	آرشين or آرشون	ell		68 cm (2.23 ft)
zirai		agricultural/yard	2 ayak	757.74 mm (2.4860 ft)
kulaç		fathom		1.8288 m (6.000 ft)
berid or menzil	بريد or منزل	range	600 ayak	227 m (745 ft)
eski mil		nautical mile	5,000 ayak	1,894.35 m (1.02287 nmi)
fersah	فرسخ	league	3 eski mil	5,685 m (3.532 mi)
merhale	مرحلة	stage, phase	200 berid	45.48 km (28.26 mi)

=== Area ===
Local name		In English	In modern units
eski dönüm	اسكی دونوم	old dunam	919 m^{2} (9,890 sq ft)
büyük dönüm	بیوك دونوم	big dunam	2,720 m^{2} (29,300 sq ft)

=== Volume ===
Local name		In English	Equivalence	In modern units
şinik		peck		9.25 L (2.44 US gal)
kile (Istanbul)	كيله	bushel	4 şinik	37 L (9.8 US gal)

=== Weight ===
Local name		In English	Equivalence	In modern units
kırat	قيراط	carat		0.2004 g (1.002 carats) (Note: In this and following weight units, kg and g mean technically kg-weight or g-weight.)
dirhem	درهم	(Turkish) dram	16 kırat	3.207 g (0.1131 oz)
okka	اوقه	oka	400 dirhem	1.282 kg (2.83 lb)
miskal	مثقال		1.5 dirhem	4.25 g (0.150 oz)
batman	بطمان		6 okka	7.697 kg (16.97 lb)
kantar	قنطار	weighbridge		56.449 kg (124.45 lb)
çeki	چكی		4 kantar	225.789 kg (497.78 lb)

=== Volumetric flow ===
Local name		In modern units
hilal	هلال	0.6526 L/min
çuvaldız		1.125 L/min
masura		4.5 L/min
kamış	قامش	9 L/min
lüle	لوله	36 L/min

== Time ==
The traditional calendar of the Ottoman Empire was, like in most Muslim countries, the Islamic calendar. Its era begins from the Hijra in 622 CE and each year is calculated using the 12 Arabian lunar months, approximately eleven days shorter than a Gregorian solar year. In 1839, however, a second calendar was put in use for official matters. The new calendar, which was called the Rumi also began by 622, but with an annual duration equal to a solar year after 1840. In modern Turkey, the Gregorian calendar was adopted as the legal calendar, beginning by the end of 1925. But the Islamic calendar is still used when discussing dates in an Islamic context.

== See also ==
- Measurement
