= French units =

French units could refer to any of:

- Units of measurement in France before the French Revolution, used in France until 1795.
- Mesures usuelles, used in France until 1839.
- The International System of Units, the present-day metric system of units.
- The French catheter scale, used for measuring the diameters of medical catheters.

== See also ==
- Units of measurement in France
