= Cypriot units of measurement =

Units of measurement used in Cyprus

A number of different units of measurement were historically used in Cyprus to measure quantities like length, mass, area and capacity. Before the Metric system, the Imperial system was used, which was introduced during British rule, and the Ottoman units of measurement was introduced during Ottoman Turkish rule. Vestiges of the Byzantine units of measurements existed, which were adopted to the Ottoman units of measurements, such as the stremma (on which the Ottoman donum is based). In between 1986-1988, metric system was adopted in Cyprus.

== Units used alongside the Imperial system ==
A number of units were used alongside the Imperial system.

=== Length ===
One pic was equal to 2 feet (0.6096 m). Prior to the adoption of the metric system for units of length in 1986, this was the base unit for length. Other units used were the following:

1 inch = 2.54 cm or 1/12 foot, 1/24 pic, or 1/36 yard

1 foot = 30.48 cm or 12 inches, 1/2 pic, or 1/3 yard

1 yard = 0.9144 m or 3 feet, or 1 1/2 pics

1 chain = 20.1168 m or 66 feet, 33 pics, or 22 yards

1 mile = 1.609344 km or 5280 feet, 2640 pics, 1760 yards, or 80 chains

=== Area ===
One donum was equal to 1337.803776 m^{2} and was divided into 4 evleks, each of them covering 3600 sq. feet or 400 sq. yards; in Imperial units, a donum is equivalent to 40/121 acre. The Greek name for donum is σκάλα. Prior to the adoption of the metric system for units of area in 1986, this was the base unit for area. Other units used were the following:

1 square inch = 6.4516 cm^{2} or 1/144 sq. feet

1 square foot = 0.09290304 m^{2} or 1/9 sq. yards, or 144 sq. inches

1 square yard = 0.83612736 m^{2} or 1/400 evleks, 1/1600 donums, or 9 square feet

1 evlek = 334.450944 m^{2} or 1/4 donum, 400 square yards, or 3600 square feet

1 square mile = 2.589988110336 km^{2} or 640 acres, or 1936 donums

=== Mass ===
One oke was equal to exactly 2.8 pounds avoirdupois (1.270058636 kg) and was divided into 4 onjas, each of them weighing 100 drams. Prior to the adoption of the metric system for units of mass in 1986, this was the base unit for mass. Other units used were the following:

1 dram = 3.17514659 g or 1/400 oke; in Imperial units, it was equivalent to 49 grains

1 Cyprus litre = 2.2861055448 kg or 1 4/5 okes or 720 drams; in Imperial units, it was equivalent to 5 1/25 pounds

1 kantar = 55,882579984 kg or 44 okes, or 24 4/9 Cyprus litres; in Imperial units, it was equivalent to 123 1/5 pounds

1 Aleppo kantar (used for carobs) = 228.61055448 kg or 180 okes, 100 Cyprus litres, or 11/45 kantar; in Imperial units, it was equivalent to 504 pounds

1 ton = 1016,0469088 kg or 800 okes, 444 4/9 Cyprus litres, 18 2/11 kantars, or 4 4/9 Aleppo kantars; in Imperial units, it is equivalent to 20 long cwt or 2240 pounds

=== Capacity ===
One kilé was equal to 1 Imperial bushel or 8 gallons, i.e. 36.368735032 L. Prior to the adoption of the metric system for units of capacity in 1986 (1988 for milk), this was the base unit for capacity Other units used (for dry and liquid measures) were the following:

1 pint = 568.261484875 mL or 20 fluid ounces

1 quart = 1.13652296975 L or 2 pints, or 1 3/25 Cyprus litres

1 Cyprus oke = 1.27290572612 L or 2 6/25 Cyprus litres

1 Cyprus litre = 3.1822643153 L or 2 1/2 Cyprus okes, or 2 4/5 quarts

1 gallon = 4.546091879 L or 4 quarts, or 8 pints (The legal definition of the gallon and derived units in Cyprus was not the same as in the UK; in fact, the 1965 definition was used.)

1 kartos = 5.09162290448 L or 4 Cyprus okes, 1.6 Cyprus litres, or 1 3/25 gallons

With regard to liquid measures, the following units were also used:

1 kouza = 10.22870672775 L or 2 1/4 gallons, 9 quarts or 18 pints

1 gomari or load = 163.659307644 L or 16 kouzas, 36 gallons, 144 quarts, or 288 pints (used for grain too).
