= Puerto Rican units of measurement =

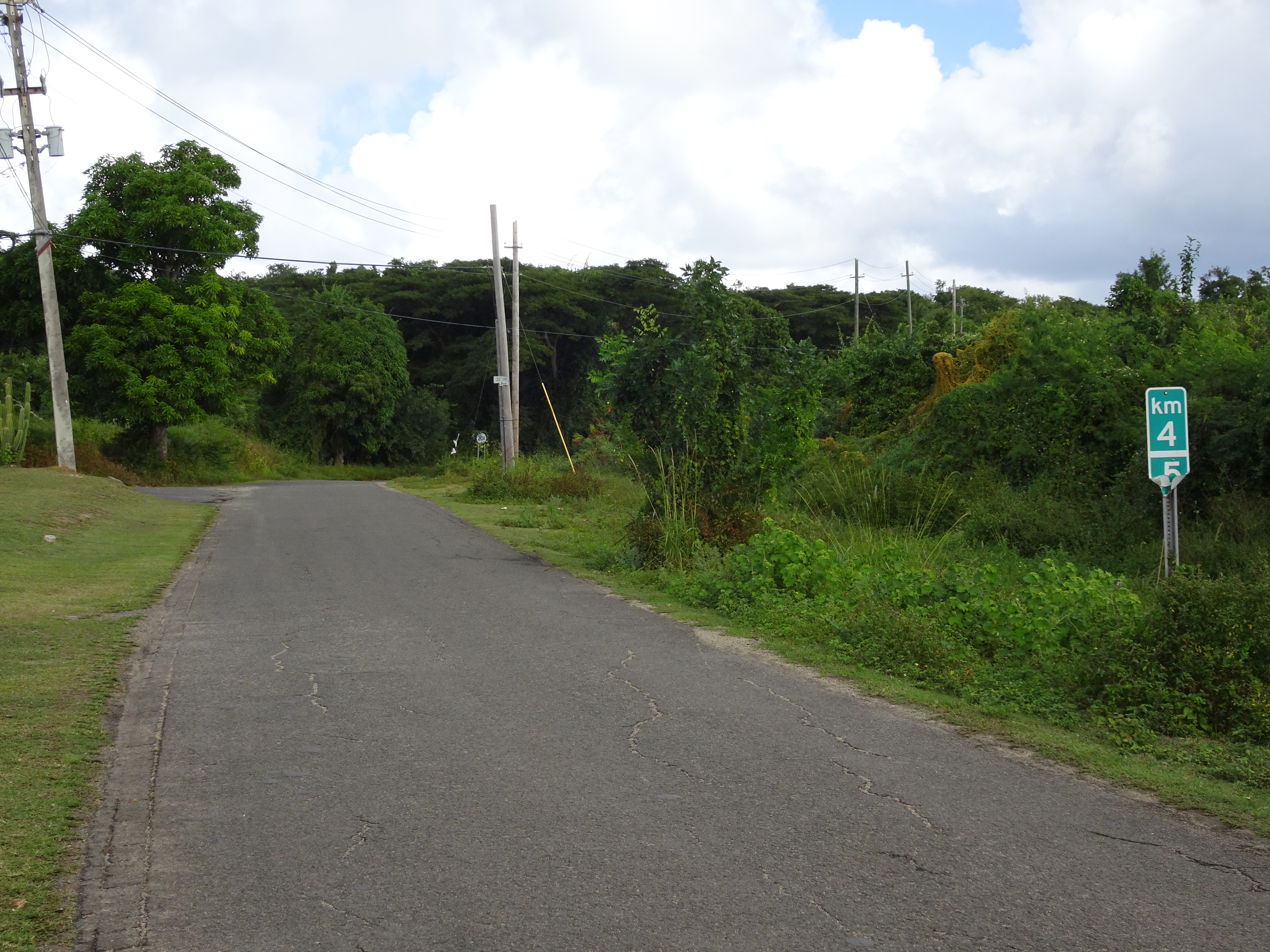
Kilometer marker near Vieques

Several units of measurements are used in Puerto Rico. The units of measurements officially in use in Puerto Rico are the SI units (metric system) and the United States customary units, with the metric system officially adopted earlier during Spanish rule in 1860. The only Spanish unit of measurement still in official use, is the unit of area measurement cuerda.

For this reason, the use of different units, either separately or in the same context with supplements, is the norm in Puerto Rico.

== Examples ==
- Weather reports are generally given in Fahrenheit, inches, feet, miles per hour and knots, because Puerto Rico uses weather forecasts from the National Oceanic and Atmospheric Administration of the United States, with metric supplements generally restricted to websites which use them.
- Altitudes and depths for geographical features are given in both meters and feet as well as kilometers and miles.
- Roadway distance signs are measured in kilometers and since 1980, gasoline is sold by the liter, however speed limits are measured in miles per hour.
- House and retail sizes are generally given in square feet, but rarely in square meters.
- Land sizes are generally given in cuerdas and acres, but rarely in hectares.
- Height and weight are given inches, feet and pounds (and for babies, additionally in ounces), but also in centimeters, meters and kilograms (and for babies, additionally in grams).
- Fruits and vegetables are generally measured and sold in pounds and ounces.
- Packaged products always include both metric units and U.S. customary units.

== System before US customary units ==
Several units were used before the US takeover in 1898. These units were older Spanish units.

=== Area ===
Several units were used to measure area. Among them were the cuerda and the caballería.

==== Cuerda ====
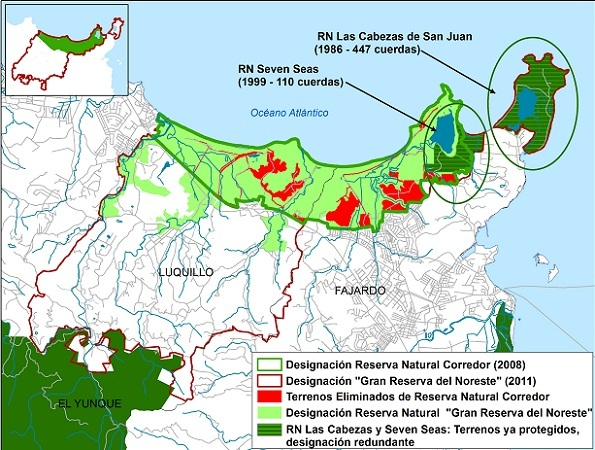
Map related to the Northeast Ecological Corridor with areas measured in cuerdas

In Puerto Rico, a cuerda is a traditional unit of land area nearly equivalent to 3,930 square meters, or 4,700 square yards, 0.971 acres, or 0.393 hectares (ha). The precise conversion is 1 cuerda = 3,930.395625 m^{2}. The term "Spanish acre" instead has been used sometimes by mainlanders. A cuerda and an acre have often been treated as equal because they are nearly the same size. As of 2019 it continues to be an official unit of land measure in Puerto Rico.

==== Caballería ====
Caballería was a unit of land measurement in the Spanish viceroyalties in the Americas during the times of the Spanish Empire in 16th through 19th century Puerto Rico. Widely used then, it was equivalent to 78.58 hectares (194.2 acres). This unit of measure is obsolete.
