= Gisla =

Gisla may refer to:

- Gísla saga, Old Norse story
- A variant of the name Gisela:
  - Gisla, 9th-century countess, daughter of Hessi
  - Gisla (abbess) of Liesborn Abbey (fl. c. 1000)
  - Gisla, co-founder of the Abbey of Sant'Eustachio (c. 1050)
- Gisla, location on the Isle of Lewis in Ross and Cromarty
  - Gisla Hydro-Electric Scheme
- Gisla, two Somali units of measurement
