= Kapag Puno Na ang Salop =

1987 action film starring Fernando Poe Jr.

- Film poster
- Directed by: Arturo San Agustin
- Written by: Pablo Gomez; Fred Navarro
- Produced by: FPJ
- Starring: Fernando Poe Jr.
- Cinematography: Ver P. Reyes
- Edited by: Augusto Salvador
- Music by: Ernani Cuenco
- Color process: Eastmancolor
- Production companies: FPJ Productions; EG Productions
- Release date: September 17, 1987
- Running time: 118 minutes
- Country: Philippines
- Language: Filipino

Kapag Puno Na ang Salop (lit. 'When the Ganta Is Full') is a 1987 Filipino action film directed by Arturo San Agustin and starring Fernando Poe Jr. (also producer), Eddie Garcia, Paquito Diaz, Jose Romulo, Dencio Padilla, Roy Alvarez, and Rowena Moran. Produced by FPJ Productions, the film was released on November 26, 1987. Critic Luciano E. Soriano of the Manila Standard gave the film a positive review, praising the dialogue and Poe and Garcia's performances which elevate its formulaic plot.

Kapag Puno Na ang Salop was followed by two sequels: Ako ang Huhusga in 1989, and Hindi Ka Na Sisikatan ng Araw: Kapag Puno Na ang Salop Part-III in 1990.

== Synopsis ==
Sergeant Isagani Guerrero, an honest law enforcer, is on a mission to expose Judge Valderama's corrupt practices following the judge's promotion in Manila.

== Cast and characters ==
Main cast

- Fernando Poe Jr. as P/Sgt. Isagani "Gani" Guerrero PC/INP
- Eddie Garcia as Judge Ricardo Valderama

Supporting cast

- Paquito Diaz as Paquito "Leni" Maramag
- Jose Romulo
- Dencio Padilla as P/Sgt. Mario Sibal PC/INP
- Roy Alvarez as Dante
- Rowena Moran as Tina
- Lito Anzures as Mang Porong, Dante's uncle
- Jimmy Fabregas as Dr. Cruz
- Augusto Victa as Mang Berto
- Ernie Zarate
- Nanding Fernandez as P/Maj. Narciso S. Fernandez MPF PC/INP
- Delia Razon as Arwina
- Rudy Meyer as Manding
- Rene Hawkins P/Sgt. Ramiro PC/INP
- Luis Benedicto as Rafael "Paeng" Yllana
- Aida Pedido
- Eddie Tuazon as Antonio "Tonying" Gomez
- Mel Arca
- Jimmy Reyes
- Gwen Culmenares

== Release ==
Kapag Puno Na ang Salop was released on November 26, 1987. It had a successful opening at the box office despite the then-ongoing Super Typhoon Sisang (internationally known as Typhoon Nina).

=== Critical response ===
Luciano E. Soriano of the Manila Standard gave Kapag Puno Na ang Salop a positive review, praising its clever dialogue and the larger-than-life performances of Poe and Garcia despite it utilizing the same narrative formula as Poe's other action films. He stated that "Never mind if we have seen this before. Poe knows how to hold the audience spellbound."
