= Nicaraguan units of measurement =

Units of measurement used in Nicaragua

A number of units of measurement were used in Nicaragua to measure measurements in mass, area, volume, etc. In Nicaragua, the metric system was adopted in 1910, and has been compulsory since 1912, by a joint convention between Costa Rica, Guatemala, Honduras, Nicaragua and El Salvador.

== Pre-metric units ==
Before the metric system, a number of modified Spanish (i.e. Spanish Castilian), English and local units were used.

=== Mass ===
Several units were used to measure mass in the above five countries. Some of these units are given below:

1 caja = 16 kg

1 carga = 161 kg

=== Area ===
Several units were used to measure area in these countries. One manzana was equal to 10,000 square varas or 6987.4 m^{2}. (A vara was an obsolete Spanish unit of length equal to 0.8359 m.) One caballeria was equal to 64 manzanas.

=== Volume ===
Several units were used to measure volume in these countries. One botella was equal to 0.63 to 0.67 litres. One cajuela was equal to 16.6 litres. However the capacity of one cuartillo is very variable.

One fanega is 20 cajuela
