= French units of measurement =

Units of measurement used in France

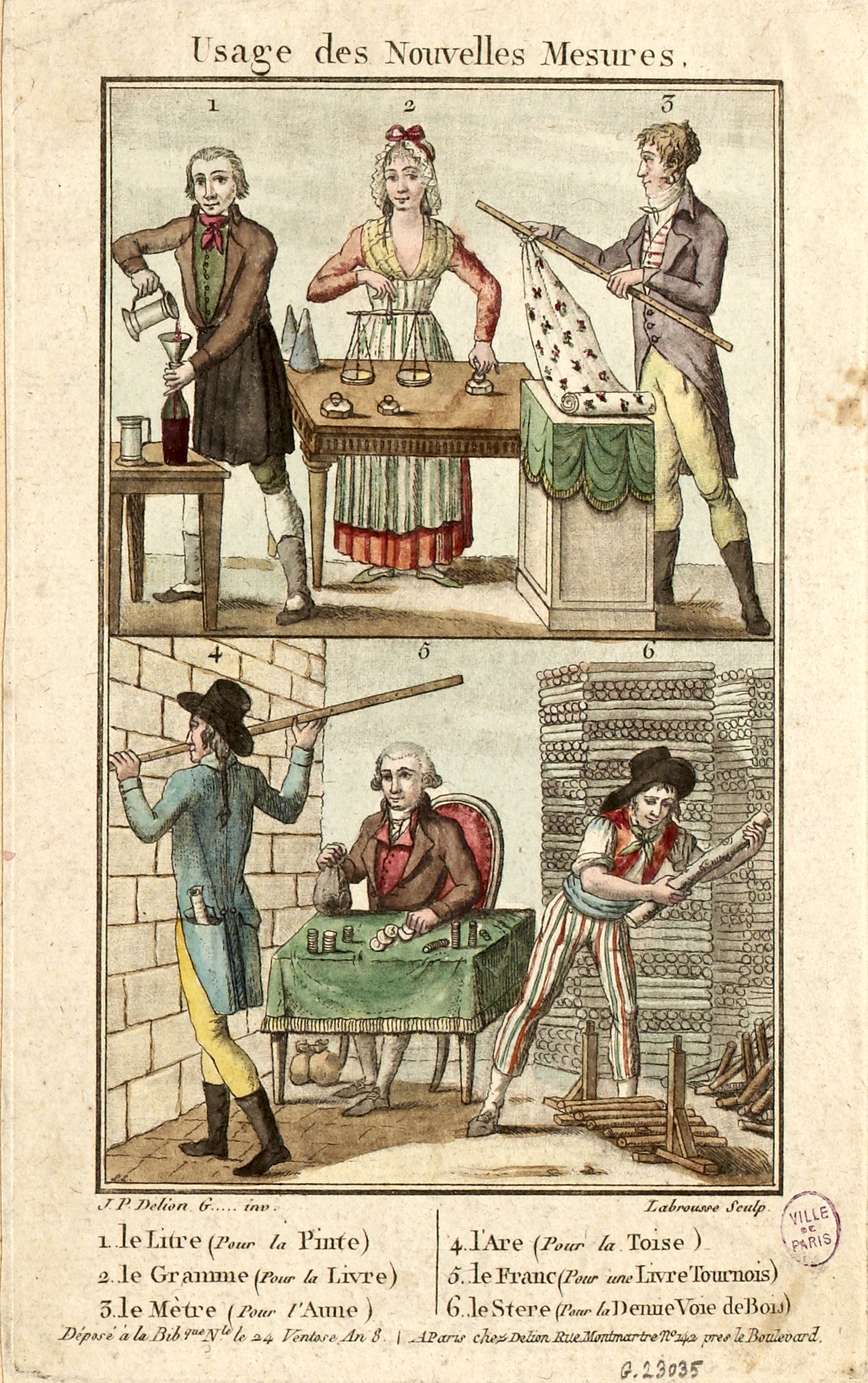
Woodcut dated 1800 illustrating the new decimal units which became the legal norm across all France on 4 November 1800

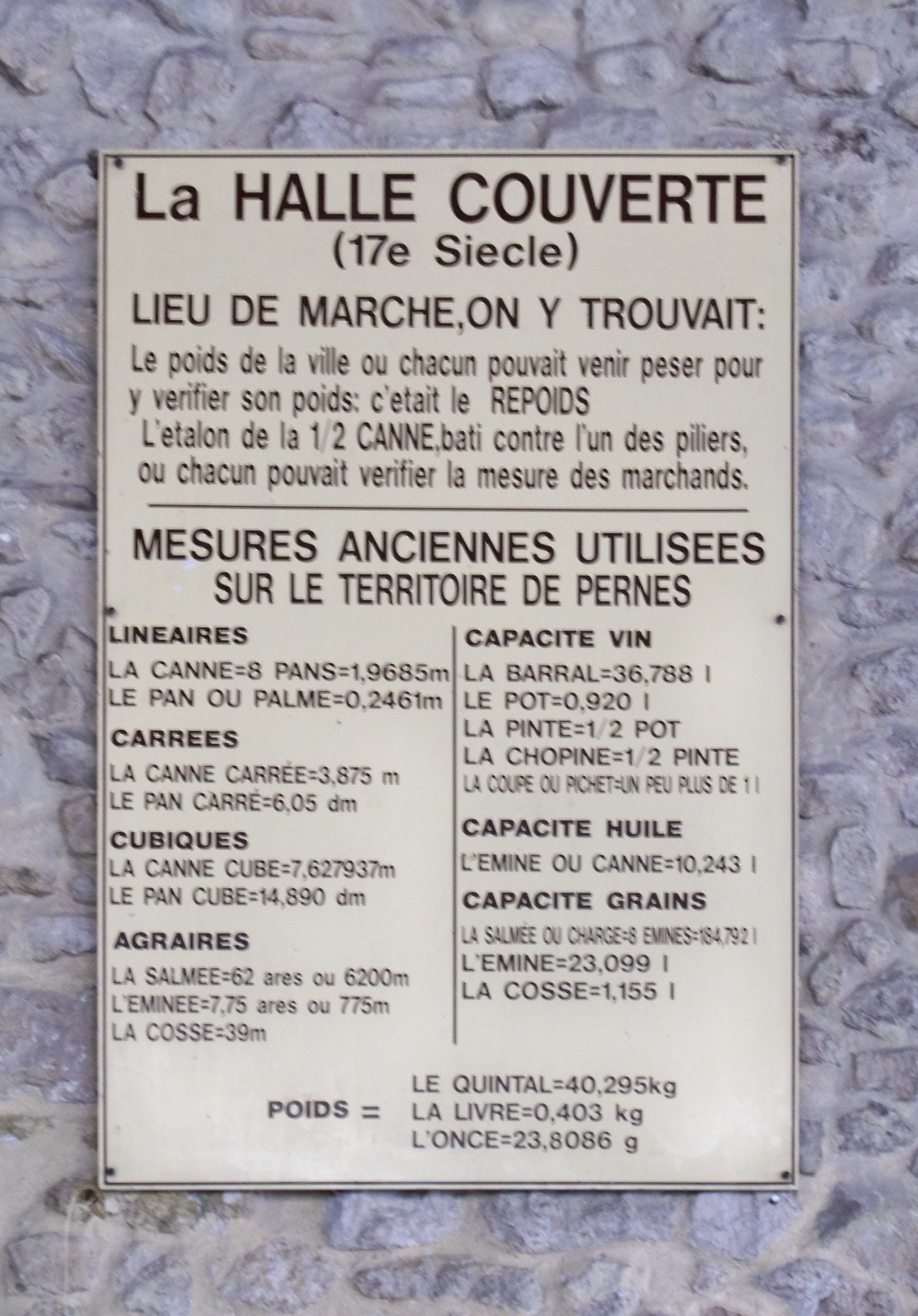
Table of the measuring units used in the 17th century at Pernes-les-Fontaines in the covered market at Provence-Alpes-Côte d'Azur region of southeastern France

France has a unique history of units of measurement due to its radical decision to invent and adopt the metric system after the French Revolution.

In the Ancien régime and until 1795, France used a system of measures that had many of the characteristics of the modern Imperial System of units but with no unified system. There was widespread abuse of the king's standards, to the extent that the lieue could vary from 3.268 km in Beauce to 5.849 km in Provence. During the revolutionary era and motivated in part by the inhomogeneity of the old system, France switched to the first version of the metric system. This system was not well received by the public, and between 1812 and 1837, the country used the mesures usuelles – traditional names were restored, but the corresponding quantities were based on metric units: for example, the livre (pound) became exactly 500 g. After 1837, the metric system was reintroduced and progressively became the only system of use, with other units now in only residual use.

== Ancien régime (to 1795) ==
In the pre-revolutionary era (before 1795), France used a system of measures that had many of the characteristics of the modern Imperial System of units, but there was no unified system of measurement. Charlemagne and successive kings had tried but failed to impose a unified system of measurement in France. (In England, by contrast, the Magna Carta decreed that "there shall be one unit of measure throughout the realm.")

The names and relationships of many units of measure were adopted from Roman units of measure and many more were added – it has been estimated that there were seven or eight hundred different names for the various units of measure. In addition, the quantity associated with each unit of measure differed from town to town and even from trade to trade to such an extent that the lieue (league) could vary from 3.268 km in Beauce to 5.849 km in Provence. It has been estimated that, on the eve of the Revolution, a quarter of a million different units of measure were in use in France. Although certain standards, such as the pied du roi (the king's foot) had a degree of pre-eminence and were used by savants across Europe, many traders chose to use their own measuring devices, giving scope for fraud and hindering commerce and industry.

As an example, the weights and measures used at Pernes-les-Fontaines in southeastern France differ from those catalogued later in this article as having been used in Paris. In many cases, the names are different, while the livre is shown as being 403 g, as opposed to 489 g – the value of the livre du roi. (The Imperial pound is about 453.6 g.)

== Revolutionary France (1795–1812) ==
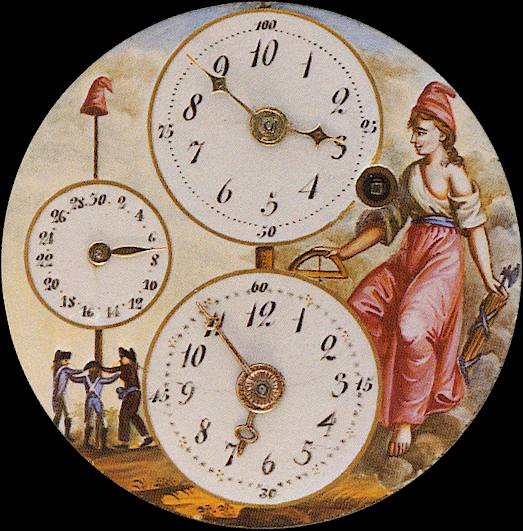
A clock of the republican era showing both decimal and standard time.

The French Revolution and subsequent Napoleonic Wars marked the end of the Age of Enlightenment. The forces of change that had been brewing manifested themselves across all of France, including the way in which units of measure should be defined. The savants of the day favored the use of a system of units that were inter-related and which used a decimal basis.

There was also a wish that the units of measure should be for all people and for all time and therefore not dependent on an artefact owned by any one particular nation. Talleyrand, at the prompting of the savant Condorcet, approached the British and the Americans in the early 1790s with proposals of a joint effort to define the metre. In the end, these approaches came to nothing and France decided to "go it alone".

Decimal time was introduced in the decree of 5 October 1793 under which the day was divided into 10 "decimal hours", the "hour" into 100 " decimal minutes" and the "decimal minute" into 100 "decimal seconds". The "decimal hour" corresponded to 2 hr 24 min, the "decimal minute" to 1.44 min and the "decimal second" to 0.864 s.

The implementation of decimal time proved an immense task and under the article 22 of the law of 18 Germinal, Year III (7 April 1795), the use of decimal time was no longer mandatory. On 1 January 1806, France reverted to the traditional timekeeping.

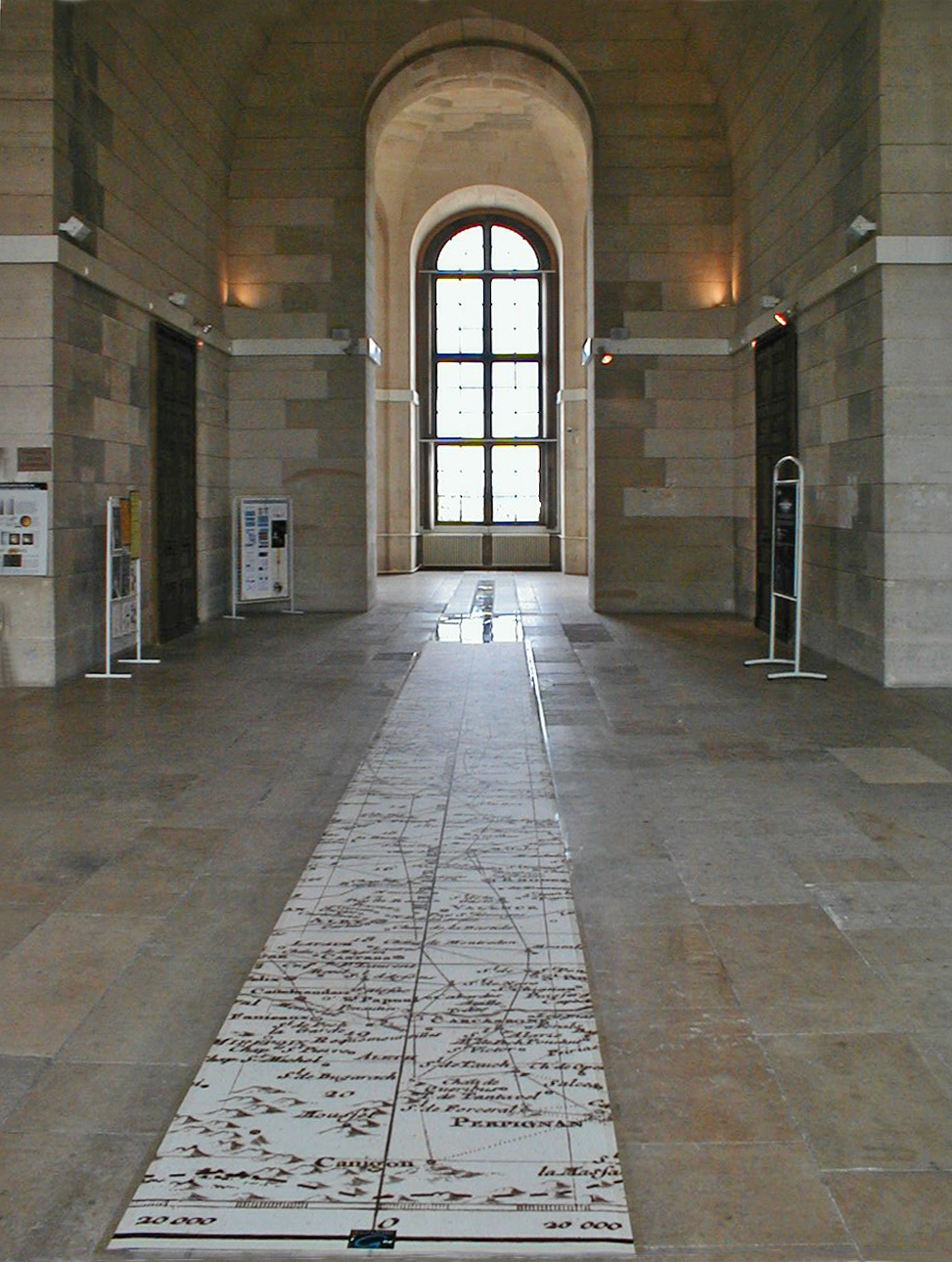
The Paris meridian, which passes through the Observatoire de Paris. The metre was defined along this meridian using a survey that stretched from Dunkirk to Barcelona.

The metric system of measure was first given a legal basis in 1795 by the French Revolutionary government. Article 5 of the law of 18 Germinal, Year III (7 April 1795) defined five units of measure. The units and their preliminary values were:

- The metre, for length – defined as being one ten millionth of the distance between the North Pole and the Equator through Paris
- The are (100 m^{2}) for area [of land]
- The stère (1 m^{3}) for volume of firewood
- The litre (1 dm^{3}) for volumes of liquid
- The gram, for mass – defined as being the mass of one cubic centimetre of water

Decimal multiples and submultiples of these units would be defined by Greek prefixes - "myria", "kilo", "hecta" (100), "deka" - and Latin prefixes - "deci", "centi" and "milli". Using Cassini's survey of 1744, a provisional value of 443.44 lignes was assigned to the metre which, in turn, defined the other units of measure.

The final value of the metre had to wait until 1799, when Delambre and Mechain presented the results of their survey between Dunkirk and Barcelona that fixed the length of the metre at 443.296 lignes. The law 19 Frimaire An VIII (10 December 1799) defined the metre in terms of this value and the kilogram as being 18,827.15 grains. These definitions enabled the construction of reference copies of the kilogram and metre, which were to be used as standards for the next 90 years.

At the same time, a new decimal-based system for angular measurement was implemented. The right angle was divided into 100 grads, which in turn was divided in 100 centigrads. An arc on the earth’s surface formed by an angle of one centigrad was one kilometre.

== Mesures usuelles (1812–1839) ==
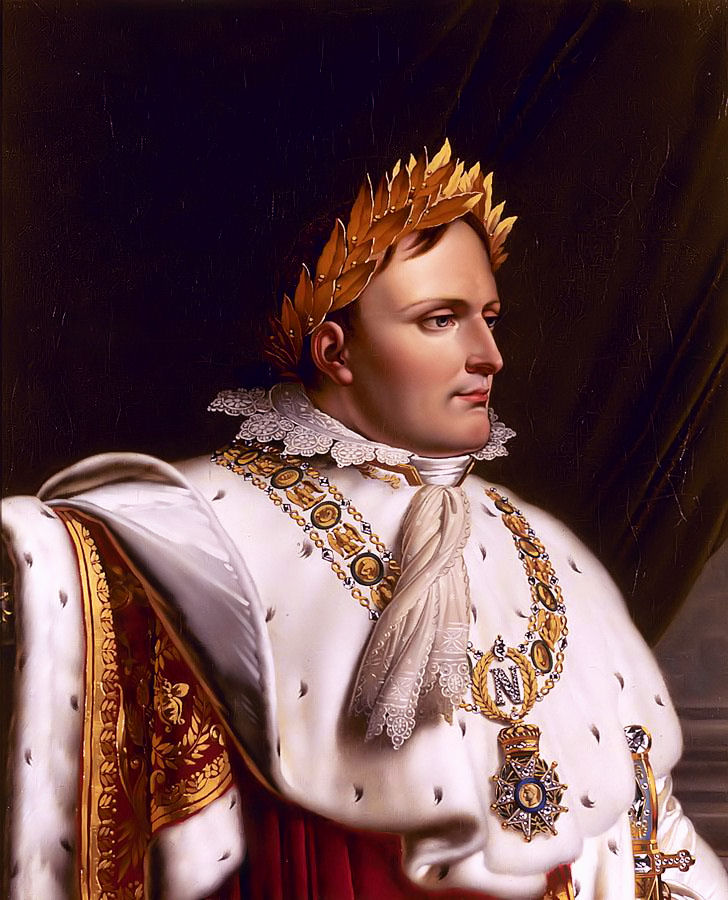
The Mesures usuelles were introduced by Napoleon I in 1812

The metric system was introduced into France in 1795 on a district by district basis, starting with Paris. However, the introduction was by modern standards poorly managed. Although thousands of pamphlets were distributed, the Agency of Weights and Measures, which oversaw the introduction, underestimated the work involved. Paris alone needed 500,000 metre sticks, yet one month after the metre became the sole legal unit of measure, there were only 25,000 in store. This, combined with other excesses of the Revolution made the metric system unpopular.

Napoleon ridiculed the metric system, but as an able administrator, he recognized the value of a sound basis for a uniform system of measurement. Under the décret impérial du 12 février 1812 (imperial decree of 12 February 1812), he introduced a revised system of measure – the mesures uselles or "customary measures" for use in small retail businesses. However, all government, legal and similar works still had to use the metric system and the metric system continued to be taught at all levels of education. Many pre-metric units were reintroduced, with their old relations to each other, but were redefined in terms of metric units. Thus the aune was defined as 120 centimetres and the toise (fathom) as being two metres, with as before six pieds (feet) making up one toise, twelve pouces (inches) making up one pied and twelve lignes making up one pouce. Likewise, for mass and weight, the livre (pound) was defined as being 500 g, each livre comprising sixteen onces and each once eight gros.

== The metric system restored (1840–1875) ==
La loi du 4 juillet 1837 (the law of 4 July 1837) of the July Monarchy effectively revoked the use of mesures usuelles by reaffirming the laws of measurement of 1795 and 1799 to be used from 1 May 1840. However, many units of measure, such as the livre, remained in colloquial use for many years and the livre still does to some extent.

When this legislation was introduced, the metric system was beginning to take hold across Europe. Switzerland and the German state of Baden had both defined their Fuß (foot) as being 300 mm and the German state of Hessen-Darmstadt has defined its Fuß as being 250 mm. Moreover, the Netherlands, Belgium, Greece, Lombardy and Venice had all adopted the metric system, albeit with local names for the "metre", "kilogram" and so on. The metric system was given a boost when the German Zollverein (Customs Union) introduced the Zollpfund of 500 g in 1850.

The Great Exhibition of 1851 in London was followed by international exhibitions in Paris in 1855 and 1867. The 1867 exhibition had a stand showing how the diverse units of measure were converging onto the metric system – a system that had been developed in France and whose standards were in the custody of the French government, but available for world use.

In 1870, while France was preparing to host an international conference to discuss international cooperation in the sphere of units of measurement, the Franco-Prussian War broke out. France was humiliated by Prussia's military action, but in 1872 France seized the diplomatic initiative and re-issued the invitations for the 1870 conference. The conference met in 1875 and concluded with the signing of the Treaty of the Metre. The principal agreements under the treaty were:

- A three-tier organization would be put into place to provide political (CGPM), scientific (CIPM) and secretarial (BIPM) support for coordinating calibrations of national standards against an international standard.
- One of the eighteen seats on the CIPM would always be filled by a Frenchman.
- France would provide premises for the secretariat. These premises, at the Pavillon de Breteuil, near Paris would have diplomatic status.
- New prototypes of the kilogram and metre would be manufactured. These were ultimately made in England and delivered in 1889.

Thus the French metre and kilogram passed into international control.

== International era (1875 onwards) ==
During the early part of the twentieth century, the French introduced their own units of power – the poncelet, which was defined as being the power required to raise a mass of 100 kg against standard gravity with a velocity of 1 m/s, giving a value of 980.665 W. However, many other European countries defined their units of power (the Pferdestärke in Germany, the paardekracht in the Netherlands and the cavallo vapore in Italy) using 75 kg rather than 100 kg, which gave a value of 735.49875 W (about 0.985 HP). Eventually, the poncelet was replaced with the cheval vapeur, which was identical to equivalent units of measure in neighboring countries. In 1977, these units, along with the stère and the livre (and amongst others, the German Pfund) were proscribed by EEC Directive 71/354/EEC which required EU member states to standardize on the International System of Units (SI) and therefore to use the watt and its multiples.

== See also ==
- International System of Units
- Jean-Antoine Chaptal
- Mansus
- Mesures usuelles
- Réaumur scale
- Systems of measurement
- Units of measurement
- Units of measurement in France before the French Revolution
