= Caballería =

Unit of area measurement in colonial Spanish times in the Americas

- Unit system: Spanish
- Unit of: area

Conversions
1 caballería in ...	... is equal to ...
- hectares: 78.58 ha
- acres: 194.2 acres

The caballería (lit. 'cavalry') was a unit of land measurement in medieval Spain and in the Spanish viceroyalties in the Americas during the times of the Spanish Empire in the 16th through 19th centuries Spanish West Indies. The unit was widely used in Puerto Rico, where it was equivalent to 78.58 hectares (194.2 acres).

== History ==
A decree of King Ferdinand V on 18 June 1513 is the first known law granting land in the Americas to Europeans. The decree dictated that conquered lands could be granted to Spanish soldier in two units: caballerías and peonías. The decree extended to the New World a system Castile had already been using for areas it conquered in Europe. While a "peonía" was the amount of land granted a retiring foot soldier, a caballería was the amount granted to a retiring cavalryman. The unit was over four times larger than a peonía.

Land grants measuring one or more caballerías were issued to the members of the cavalry of a Spanish war company upon resulting victorious over a territory during a war conquest expedition, with the condition that once the soldier had decided to make his residence at such location, they committed themselves to the defense of the town where they were to reside.

== Demise ==
As open land became less available for granting by the Spanish Crown, and as portions of caballerías were pieced apart by their owners in sales transactions into smaller land units too small to be measured in caballerías and, thus, measured in the more convenient cuerda units, the use of caballería units started to become obsolete.
