= Venezuelan units of measurement =

A number of units of measurement were used in Venezuela to measure quantities like length, mass, etc. Metric system was optional in Venezuela since 1857, and has been compulsory since 1914.

== System before metric system ==
Older system was Spain (Castilian) System.

=== Length ===
Several units were used. Following of Granada:

1 vara = 0.8 m

1 meile = 6280 vara.

Some other units are:

1 legua = 6280 vara

1 pie = 1/3 vara

1 cuarta = 1/4 vara

1 pulgada = 1/36 vara.

According to an older source, one vara was equal to 0.835 m (32.874 in).

=== Mass ===
Several units were used. Following of Granada:

1 libra = 0.5 kg

1 bag = 62.5 kg.

Some other units are:

1 tonelada = 2000 libra

1 carga = 250 libra

1 Saco = 125 libra

1 Quintal = 100 libra

1 arroba = 25 libra

1 onza = 1/16 libra.

According to another older source, one quintal was equal to 46.012 kg (101.438 1 lb).

=== Capacity ===
One arroba was equal to 16.137 L.
