= Cuban units of measurement =

Units of measurement used in Cuba

A number of units of measurement were used in Cuba to measure quantities like mass, area, and capacity. In Cuba, Metric system has been compulsory since 1858.

== Units after metrication ==
In the 1920s, other units from non-Metric Systems, old Spanish and American and local, were also used.

=== Length ===
Several units were used to measure length. Legua was approximately equal to 2 2/3 in, which is substantially different from the value of a Legua in Spanish customary units and a League elsewhere, which varied from about 1,500 metres to 11,000 metres.

One vara was equal to 33.384 in.

=== Mass ===
A number of units were used to measure mass. Some of units which were used in the 1920s too in addition to metric system, and which belonged to old Spanish, American, and local, are provided below:

1 tonelada (or millier) = 1000.0 kg

1 tercio = 72.22 kg.

One libra was equal to 1.0161 lb (U.S. pound of 1893).

=== Area ===
Several units were used to measure area. As in the 1920s, one caballeria Cubana was equal to 134,202 m^{2}. Some of units which were used in the 1920s too in addition to metric system, and which belonged to old Spanish, American, and local, are provided below:

1 Cordele = 1/324 Caballeria

1 Fanega = 1/12 Caballeria

=== Capacity ===
Several units were used to measure volume. As in 1920s, one bocoy was equal to 136.27 L. One barrile was equal to 1/6 bocoy. One arroba (liquid measure) was equal to 4.263 gallons.

One fanega (dry measure), which was rarely used, was equal to 1.599 bushels, and one fanega (liquid measure) was equal to 16 gallons.
