= Colombian units of measurement =

A variety of units of measurement were used in Colombia to measure quantities like length, mass and area. In Colombia, International Metric System was adopted in 1853, and has been compulsory since 1854.

== Pre-metric units ==
Several different units were used before 1854. The older system before the metric system was derived from Spanish Castilian System.

=== Length ===
Different units were used to measure length. As in the 1920s too, some units were derived from metric system. One vara was equal to 0.8 m (or 0.84 m). Some other units are provided below:

1 pulgada = 1/32 vara

1 cuarta = 1/4 vara

1 pie = 1/3 vara

1 cuadra = 100 varas

1 legua = 6250 varas

=== Mass ===
A number of units were used to measure mass. As in the 1920s too, some units were derived from the metric system. One libra was equal to 0.500 kg (i.e. 500 g) (or 0.54354 kg). Some other units are provided below:

1 onza = 1/16 libra

1 arroba = 25 libra

1 quintal = 100 libra

1 saco = 125 libra

1 carga = 250 libra

1 tonelada = 2000 libra

=== Area ===
Several units were used to measure area. As in 1920s too, some units were derived from metric system. one vara^{2} was equal to 0.64 m^{2}, and one fanegada was equal to 10,000 vara^{2}
