= Romanian units of measurement =

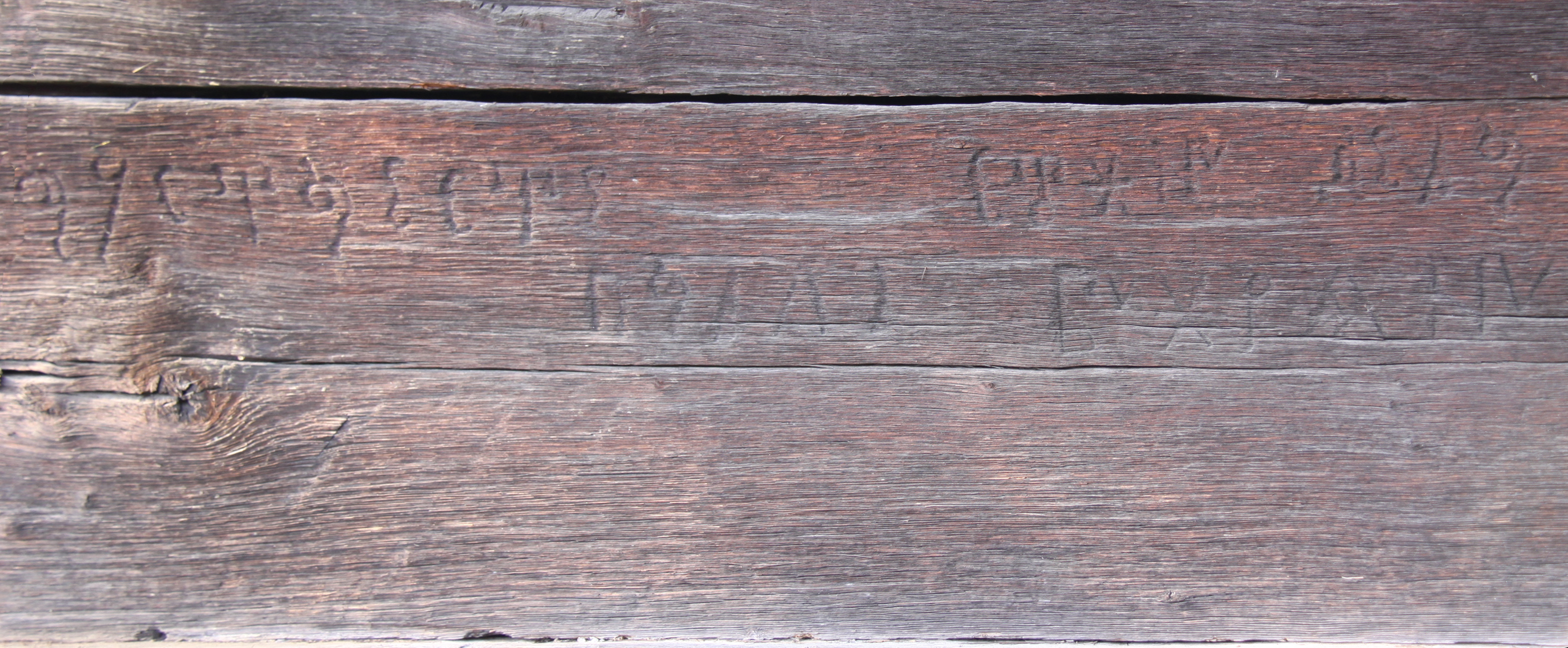
"This is the fathom from Craiova of eight palms, Bujorianu". Inscription on the wooden church in Mănăilești-Moșteni, Vâlcea county.

The measures of the old Romanian system varied greatly not only between the three Romanian states (Wallachia, Moldavia), but sometimes also inside the same country. The origin of some of the measures are the Latin (such as iugăr unit), Slavic (such as vadră unit), Greek (such as dram unit) and Turkish (such as palmac unit) systems.

This system is no longer in wide use since the adoption of the metric system in 1864, however some rural communities still use a small subset of these units.

== Length ==
- Palmă (palm) - 1/8 of a stânjen
- Stânjen - 2 m (approximately)
- Palmac - 3.48 cm (Moldavia)
- Poștă - 8–20 km (depending on the country)
- Pas mic (small step) - 4 palme (Wallachia) (palme is the plural noun for palmă)
- Pas mare (large step) - 6 palme (Wallachia; Moldavia)
- Lat de palmă (palm width) - 1/2 palmă
- Cot (cubit) - 664 mm (Moldavia); 637 mm (Wallachia)
- Funie (rope) - 20–120 m (depending on the place)
- Leghe (league) - 4.444 km;
- Deget (finger) – the width of a finger
- Prăjină – 3 stânjeni (stânjeni is the plural noun for stânjen)
- Verstă – 1067 m (3,500 ft)
- Picior (foot) – 1/6 of a stânjen

== Volume ==
Note: the "quarts" in this table are imperial quarts, not US quarts. Similarly for gallons.

Unit	Value in Moldavia	Value in Wallachia	Value in Transylvania
Oca	1.5 litres; 1.32 quarts	1.25 litres; 1.1 quarts	1.26 litres
Litră	0.25 litres; 0.22 quarts	0.25 litres; 0.22 quarts	0.25 litres; 0.22 quarts
Baniță	21.5 litres; 18.3 quarts	33.96 litres; 29.9 quarts	–
Chiup	30–40 litres; 26–35 quarts		
Câblă	unknown		
Merță	110–120 litres; 97–106 quarts	–	22.5 litres; 20 quarts
Ferdelă/Felderă	20 litres		
Obroc mare	66 litres; 58 quarts	55 litres; 48 quarts	–
Obroc mic	33 litres; 29 quarts	27.5 litres; 24 quarts	–
Giumătate	1200–1500 litres; 264-330 gallons		
Vadră	15 litres; 13 quarts	12.88 litres; 11 quarts	12.6 litres
Balercă	450 litres	386.4 litres	378 litres
Pintă	–	–	3.394 litres; 2.988 quarts
Tină	–	–	15 litres; 13 quarts
Sau	3.22–3.80 millilitres; 0.11–0.13 fluid ounces	–	–

== Weight ==
Unit	Metric value	Imperial value
Dram	3.18 - 3.25 g	50.155 Gr
Font	0.5kg	17.64 Oz

== Area ==
Unit	Metric value	Imperial value
Feredelă	1.25 m^{2}	11.61 ft^{2}
Stânjen pătrat	3.59665 m^{2}	38.714 ft^{2}
Pogon	5,000 m^{2}	46.45 ft^{2}
Falce	14.3 m^{2}	132.85 ft^{2}
Prăjină	195 m^{2}	1812 ft^{2}
Iugăr	5.700 m^{2}	52954.73 ft^{2}

== See also ==
- Historical weights and measures
- SI
- Weights and measures

=== Notes ===
- Iugăr – the area ploughed in one day by two oxen – 7166 m^{2} (Transylvania in 1517); 5,700 m² (in other states)
- Stânjen pătrat – Embracing square
