= Moroccan units of measurement =

Units of measurement used in Morocco

A number of units of measurement were used in Morocco to measure length, mass, capacity, etc. Metric system has been compulsory in Morocco since 1923.

== System before metric system ==
A number of local units were used.

=== Length ===
Several units were used. These units were variable, not rigidly defined. Some units included:

1 cubit = 0.533 m

1 canna = 0.533 m

1 pic = 0.61 m

1 tonni = 1/8 pic.

The code, covid, covado, cadee, or dhra varied from 19.85 to 22.48 in (perhaps the best value was 20.92 in (0.531 3 m).

=== Mass ===
Several units were used. These units were variable, not rigidly defined. Some units included:

1 rotal = 507.5 g

1 artal = 507.5 g

1 gerbe = 3 kg

1 kula = 22 rotal

1 kantar = 100 rotal. One rotl of commerce was equal to 1.19 lb while one rotl of the markets was equal to 1.7 lbs.

=== Capacity ===
Several units were used. These units were variable, not rigidly defined. Some units included:

1 sahh = 56 L

1 fanega = 56 L

1 mudd = 14 L

1 almude = 14 L.
