= Long ton =

Unit of mass

- Unit system: Imperial units, United States customary units
- Unit of: Mass
- Symbol: long ton
- In base units: 2,240 lb

Conversions
1 long ton in ...	... is equal to ...
- SI base units: 1,016.047 kg
- Metric tons: 1.016047 t
- Short tons: 1.12 short tons (exactly)

The long ton, also known as the imperial ton, displacement ton, or British ton, is a measurement unit equal to 2,240 pounds (1,016.0 kg). It is the name for the unit called the "ton" in the avoirdupois system of weights or Imperial system of measurements. It was standardised in the 13th century. It is used in the United States for bulk commodities.

It is not to be confused with the short ton, a unit of weight equal to 2,000 pounds (907.2 kg) used in the United States, and Canada before metrication, also referred to simply as a "ton".

== Unit definition ==
A long ton is defined as exactly 2,240 pounds. The long ton arises from the traditional British measurement system: A long ton is 20 long hundredweight (cwt), each of which is 8 stone (1 stone = 14 pounds). Thus, a long ton is 20 × 8 × 14 lb = 2,240 lb.

== Unit equivalences ==
A long ton, also called the weight ton (W/T), imperial ton, or displacement ton, is equal to:

- 2,240 pounds (1,016.0 kilograms; 1.0160 metric tons)
- exactly 12% more than the 2,000 pounds of the North American short ton, 20 long hundredweight (112 lb) rather than 20 short hundredweight (100 lb)
- the mass of 35 cubic feet (0.991 m^{3}) of salt water with a density of 64 pounds per cubic foot (1.03 g/cm^{3})

== Usage around the world ==
=== United Kingdom ===
To comply with the practices of the European Union, the British Imperial ton was explicitly excluded from use for trade by the United Kingdom's Weights and Measures Act of 1985. The measure used since then is the tonne, equal to 1,000 kilograms.

If still used for measurement, then the word "ton" is taken to refer to an imperial or long ton.

=== United States ===
In the United States, the long ton is commonly used in measuring the displacement of ships and the shipping of baled commodities and bulk goods like iron ore and elemental sulfur.

=== International ===
The long ton was the unit prescribed for warships by the Washington Naval Treaty of 1922; for example, battleships were limited to a displacement of 35,000 long tons (35,560 t; 39,200 short tons). The long ton is traditionally used as the unit of weight in international contracts for many bulk goods and commodities.

== See also ==
- Short ton, equal to 2,000 lb (907.2 kg).
- Ton
- Tonnage, volume measurement used in maritime shipping, originally based on 100 cubic feet (2.83 m^{3}).
- Tonne, also known as a metric ton (t), equal to 1,000 kg (2,205 lb) or 1 Mg.
