= Guinean units of measurement =

Units of measurement used in Guinea

A number of units of measurement were used in Guinea to measure length, mass, etc. Since 1910, the metric system has been compulsory in Guinea.

== Units used before the metric system ==
These units were mainly Portugal, England and local.

=== Length ===
Several units were used to measure length. Some of units are provided below:

1 pik = 0.578 m

1 jacktan = 3.658 m.

== Mass ==
A number of units were used to measure mass. One benda was equal to 0.0642 kg. One kantar was equal to 0.977 kg. One gammell was 1/5 kantar. Some other units are given below:

1 akey = 1/48 benda

1 mediatabla = 1/32 benda

1 aguirage = 1/16 benda

1 quinto = 3/32 benda

1 piso = 1 uzan = 1/8 benda

1 seron = 3/16 benda

1 eggaba = 1/3 benda

1 benda (offa) = 1/2 benda p

One rotl was equal to 0.9538 lb avoirdupois.
