= Merhale =

Ottoman unit of distance

Merhale was an Ottoman unit of length.

8 fersahs were equal to 1 merhale. Fersah was based on the distance covered by a horse in normal gait per hour. Exact definition was 5685 meters.

So 1 merhale can be converted to meters.

$1 \quad \mbox{merhale}= 8 \cdot 5685 =45480 \quad \mbox {meters}$
