= Libyan units of measurement =

Units of measurement used in Libya

A number of different units of measurement were used in Libya to measure length, mass, area, etc. The metric system was adopted in Libya in 1927.

== System before the metric system ==
A number of different units were used.

=== Tripoli and Cyrenaica ===
==== Length ====
Several units were used to measure length. One pik was equal to 0.68 m as it was defined by metric equivalent. Some other units are given below (Note: these units too were defined by metric equivalents):

1 handaze = 1 pik

1 palmo = 1/3 pik

1 draa = 0.46 m. In Tripoli, draa was equal to 26.42 in and arbi draa (lesser pik) was equal to 19.029 in.

==== Mass ====
A number of units were used to measure mass. One rottolo was equal to 0.512 8 kg as it was defined by metric equivalent. Some other units are given below (Note: these units too were defined by metric equivalents):

1 oka = 2.5 rottolo = 1282 g

1 metical = 4.76 g

1 kharouba = 1/2560 oka

1 dram = 1/160 oka

1 termino = 1/128 oka

1 uckin = 1/16 oka

1 mattaro = 42 oka

1 cantar = 100 oka. In Tripoli, metical (73.6 grains) wnuas to measure gold and silver.

==== Area ====
Several units were used to measure area. One pik^{2} was equal to 0.4624 m^{2} as it was defined by it metric equivalent. Some other units were given below:

1 denum = 1600 pik^{2}

1 jabia = 1800 pik^{2}.

==== Capacity ====
Two systems, dry and liquid were used to measure capacity.

===== Dry =====
Several units were used to measure dry capacity. One orba was equal to 7.5 L as it was defined by metric equivalent (According to some sources, one orba was equal to 7.692 L). Some other units were given below:

1 nufsorbah = 1/2 orba

1 marta = 2 orba

1 kele = 2 orba

1 temen = 4 orba

1 ueba = 16 orba.

Following units were also used to measure dry capacity by weight:

1 oka =1282 g (defined by metric equivalent)

1 marta = 11–14 (oka of water)

1 kele = 2 marta. In Tripoli, 1 cafiso (20 tiberi) was equal to 1.152 bushels.

===== Liquid =====
Several units were used to measure liquid capacity. One barile was equal to 64.8 L as it was defined by metric equivalent (According to sources, one barile was equal to 62.4975 L.). One bozze was equal to 1/24 barile. One gorraf was equal to 1/5 barrile, and giarra was nearly equal to 50/71 barile. Following units were also used to measure liquid capacity by weight:

1 oka = 1282 g (defined by metric equivalent)

1 gorraf = 9.75 oka (of water)

1 giarra = 58.5 oka. In Tripoli, Mataro, for oil, was equal to 9.163 gal.

=== Marj (ancient Barca) and Fezzan ===
Barca and Fezzan had the same units as units in Tripoli.
