= Honduran units of measurement =

Units of measurement used in Honduras

A number of units of measurement were used in Honduras for length, mass, volume etc. In Honduras, the metric system was adopted in 1910, and has been compulsory since 1912, under a joint convention between Costa Rica, Guatemala, Honduras, Nicaragua and El Salvador.

== Pre-metric units ==
Before the introduction of the metric system, a number of modified Spanish (Castilian), English and local units were used, and continue to be used today by a large part of the country.

=== Length ===
A number of units were used to measure length. One vara was equal to 0.836 m. Some other units are given below:

1 cuarta = 1/4 vara

1 tercia = 1/3 vara

1 mecate = 24 varas.

1 legua = 5,000 varas

=== Area ===
The manzana was used by farmers to measure land area. For large areas, land was customarily measured in labors or legua.

1 manzana = 10,000 vara^{2} = 1.727 acres = 6,989 m^{2} ≈ .7 hectare (Note: In calculations, the equivalence of 7000 m^{2} or .7 hectare per manzana is often used to simplify conversion.)

1 labor = 1 million vara^{2}

1 legua (Note: Legua denoting area is equal to 1 square legua denoting length. In Latin America and southwestern United States, this is 4428.4 acres, 6.919 square miles, 1792 hectares, or 17.92 square kilometers.) = 25 labors = 25 million vara^{2}

=== Mass ===
Several units were used to measure mass in Costa Rica, Guatemala, Honduras, Nicaragua and El Salvador. Some units are given below:

1 caja = 16 kg

1 quintal = 100 libras (Note: The Spanish libra is slightly larger than the English pound, generally in the range from 1.011 to 1.016 English pound. Both are derived from the Roman libra, hence the abbreviation lbs for English pounds.) ≈ 46 kg ≈ 101.4 lbs

1 carga (Note: In Honduras and El Salvador a sack of beans or coffee typically weighs one quintal. Two of these are loaded on a mule or horse to make one load, or carga in Spanish. The unit carga is cited for yuca and yams as approximately 90.72 kg. There are other Spanish and Portuguese speaking countries in which a carga is equal to 3 quintals or equal to a volume of 3 quintals of a commodity being shipped.) = 2 quintals ≈ 200 lbs ≈ 90.72 kg

=== Volume ===
Several units were used to measure capacity in Costa Rica, Guatemala, Honduras, Nicaragua and El Salvador.

1 botella = 0.63 to 0.67 L.

1 cajuela = 16.6 L.

1 cuartillo varies between countries, but defined as 4 octavillos or 1/4 almude and contains 1.156 L ≈ 1.222 qt(US) (liquid) ≈ 1.017 qt(Imp)

1 fanega = 12 almudes = 48 cuartillos ≈ 55.50 L ≈ 1.960 ft^{3} (1.575 U.S. bushels)
