= Singaporean units of measurement =

Several units of measurement were historically used in Singapore to measure length, mass, and volume. During 1968–1970, the metric system was adopted in Singapore. The metric system is used for most official purposes and only metric measures are permitted for trade. Despite these restrictions, fabric is still commonly sold by the square yard.

== Historic units ==
=== Colonial Singapore ===
Numerous traditional Chinese- and Malay-derived units were used in Singapore under Straits Settlements (1826–1946).

==== Length units ====
- 1 cubit (aka. hasta) = 18 inches which is equal to 45.72 cm.

==== Mass units ====
- 1 mace (aka. miam) = 52 grain equal to 3.36954 grams.
- 1 buncal (for gold) = 822 grain equal to 53.2647 grams.

=== Independent Singapore ===
While Singapore is officially metric for trade purposes, the Third Schedule of the Weights and Measures Act 1975 provides official conversions for certain customary weights and measures. The Minister for Trade and Industry may prescribe customary measures for specific purposes and amend the Third Schedule as needed. The units are mostly derived from traditional Chinese units of measurement, though with names derived from Hokkien (e.g. "hoon" for candareen, "chhek" for chi) or Malay ("tahil" for tael, "kati" for catty).

==== Length units ====
The following units of length were legally defined by the Weights and Measures Act, but were removed in the Weights and Measures (Amendment) Act 2005.

- 1 chhun = 1 19/40 inches = 37.4650 millimetres
- 10 chhuns = 1 chhek = 14 3/4 inches = 37.4650 centimetres

==== Mass units ====
The following units of length were legally defined by the Weights and Measures Act before 2005.

- 1 tahil = 1 1/3 ounces = 37.7994 grams
- 16 tahils = 1 kati = 1 1/3 pounds = 0.6048 kilogram
- 1600 tahils = 100 katis = 1 pikul = 133 1/3 pounds = 60.4790 kilograms
- 64,000 tahils = 4,000 katis = 40 pikuls = 1 koyan = 5,333 1/3 pounds = 2419.1593 kilograms

The list was amended in 2005 to the following.

- 1 hoon = 1/10 chee = 0.377994 grams
- 1 chee = 1/10 tahil = 3.77994 grams
- 1 tahil = 1 1/3 ounces = 37.7994 grams
- 16 tahils = 1 kati = 1 1/3 pounds = 0.6048 kilogram
