= Cuerda =

Various units of measurement in Spanish-speaking regions

The term "cuerda" (Spanish for rope) refers to a unit of measurement in some Spanish-speaking regions, including Puerto Rico, Guatemala, Cuba, Spain, and Paraguay. In Puerto Rico, the term cuerda (and "Spanish acre") refers to the unit of area measurement. In Guatemala, cuerda is both a unit of length measurement as well as of area measurement. As a unit of area measurement, the Guatemalan cuerda can have various meanings. In Cuba, cuerda refers to a unit of volume measurement; in Spain (Note: In both Spain, it was a unit of distance until the 19th century; it is no longer in use.) and Paraguay, it refers to a unit of distance (length).

== By unit type ==
Cuerda is a unit of area, volume, and distance (length), depending on the country of use.

=== Area: Puerto Rico and Guatemala ===
In Puerto Rico, a cuerda is a traditional unit of land area nearly equivalent to 3,930 square meters, or 4,700 square yards, 0.971 acre, or 0.393 hectare (ha). The precise conversion is 1 cuerda = 3,930.395625 m^{2}. The term "Spanish acre" instead has been used sometimes by mainlanders. A cuerda and an acre have often been treated as equal because they are nearly the same size.

According to Carlos Menocal Villagran, in Guatemala, the term cuerda refers to a unit of area and can have various meanings. Cuerda can refer to areas that are 50 x 50, 40 x 40, 30 x 30, 25 x 25 or 20 x 20 varas (i.e. 2500, 1600, 900, 625, or 400 square varas). In addition, some sources describe a cuerda as 32 x 32 varas. In Guatemala, the linear vara is equivalent to 0.8421 meters. (Note: The length of a vara varies slightly among different Latin American countries.) Thus,

- One cuerda of 50 x 50 varas = 1,746.84 square meters
- One cuerda of 40 x 40 varas = 1,117.98 square meters
- One cuerda of 30 x 30 varas = 628.87 square meters
- One cuerda of 25 x 25 varas = 436.71 square meters
- One cuerda of 20 x 20 varas = 279.50 square meters

=== Volume: Cuba ===
In Cuba, a cuerda is a traditional unit of volume for firewood, about 21% smaller than the U.S. cord. A cuerda of firewood is equivalent to 0.79 cord or 2.87 cubic meters (128 cubic pies).

=== Distance: Guatemala, Spain and Paraguay ===
In Guatemala, a cuerda is a traditional unit of distance, equal to exactly 25 varas or almost 21 meters (nearly 69 feet).

During 19th-century Spain, a cuerda was a unit of length, of nearly 6.889 m (approx. 7.554 yd). However, in Valencia, Spain, the cuerda measured 40 varas, over 5.4 times longer, as nearly 37.21 m (approx. 40.7 yd).

== See also ==
- Caballería
