= Bolivian units of measurement =

Units of measurement used in Bolivia

A number of different units of measurement were used in Bolivia before the 1900s. Older systems were mostly derived from Spain. In Bolivia, the International Metric system was legally optional since 1871, and has been compulsory since 1893, even though the metric system was recognised at the customs-houses and other units which were of Spanish origin were also used.

== Pre-Metric Units ==
A number of units were used in Bolivia, and those units were of Spanish origin.

=== Mass ===
Different units were used to measure mass. One quintal was equal to 100 kg (101.4179 lb). One quintal was also equal to 4 arrobas.
