= Eritrean units of measurement =

Units of measurement used in Eritrea

A number of units of measurement were used in Eritrea to measure length, mass, capacity, etc.

== Units during the first half of the 20th century ==
In addition to metric units, a number of local and provincial units were used in Eritrea.

=== Length ===
Several units were used to measure length. Some of units (note: these units are vary from one province or city to another and these units are local units) are given below:

1 cubi = 0.32 m

1 emmet (1 derah) = 0.46 m.

=== Mass ===
Several units were used to measure mass. These units are vary from one province or city to another and these units are local units. One rotolo (pound) was equal to 0.448 g. Some other units are given below:

1 okia (ounce) = 1/16 rotolo

1 gisla = 163 kg.

=== Capacity ===
Several units were used to measure mass. These units are vary from one province or city to another and these units are local units. One messé was equal to 1.50 L. Some other units are given below: 1 cabaho = 4 messé

1 tanica = 12 messé

1 ghebeta = 16 messé

1 entelam = 128 messé.
