= Syrian units of measurement =

Units of measurement used in Syria

A number of units of measurement were used in Syria to measure length, mass, capacity, etc. The metric system was adopted in 1935 in Syria.

== System before metric system ==
A number of units were used.

=== Length ===
One pic was equal to 0.582 m.

=== Mass ===
A number of units were used to measure mass. One rottolo was equal to 1.785 kg. Some other units were given below:

1 drachme = 1/600 rottolo

1 pesi = 1/600 rottolo

1 metecali = 1/400 rottolo

1 mitcal = 1/400 rottolo

1 once = 1/60 rottolo

1 zurbo = 27 1/2 rottolo

1 cola = 35 rottolo

1 cantar = 100 rottolo.

=== Capacity ===
Several units were used to measure capacity. One rotl was equal to 3.2 L. Some other units are given below:

1 makuk = 250 rotl

1 garava = 450 rotl.
