= Tanzanian units of measurement =

A number of units of measurement have been used in Tanzania to measure length, mass, capacity, etc. The metric system was adopted in Tanzania from 1967 to 1969.

== System before metric system ==
A number of units were used.

=== Zanzibar ===
Several units were used in Zanzibar

==== Length ====
One ohra was equal to 0.571 m (22.48 in).

==== Weight ====
One bazla was equal to 15.525 kg (32.226 lb). One mane was equal to 2.0071 lb. One franzella of 36 rotoli was equal to 35.2822 lb.

==== Capacity ====
One djezla was equal to 257.4 L (7.305 bushels).
