= Slovak units of measurement =

Units of measurement used in Slovakia

A number of units of measurement were used in Slovakia to measure length, capacity, etc. Since 1876, under Czechoslovakia, Metric system has been compulsory.(Local measures and Old Vienna (v. Austria) measures were still used during time the state, Czechoslovakia, was established.)

== Old local measures during the first half of the 20th century ==
A number of units were used to measure quantities like length and capacity.

=== Length ===
A number of units were used in Czechoslovakia to measure length. One latro was equal to 1.917 m.

=== Capacity ===
In Czechoslovakia, several units were used to measure capacity. One korec (or one strych) was equal to 93.592 L.
