= Manzana (unit) =

Unit of land area used in Chile, Argentina and Central American countries

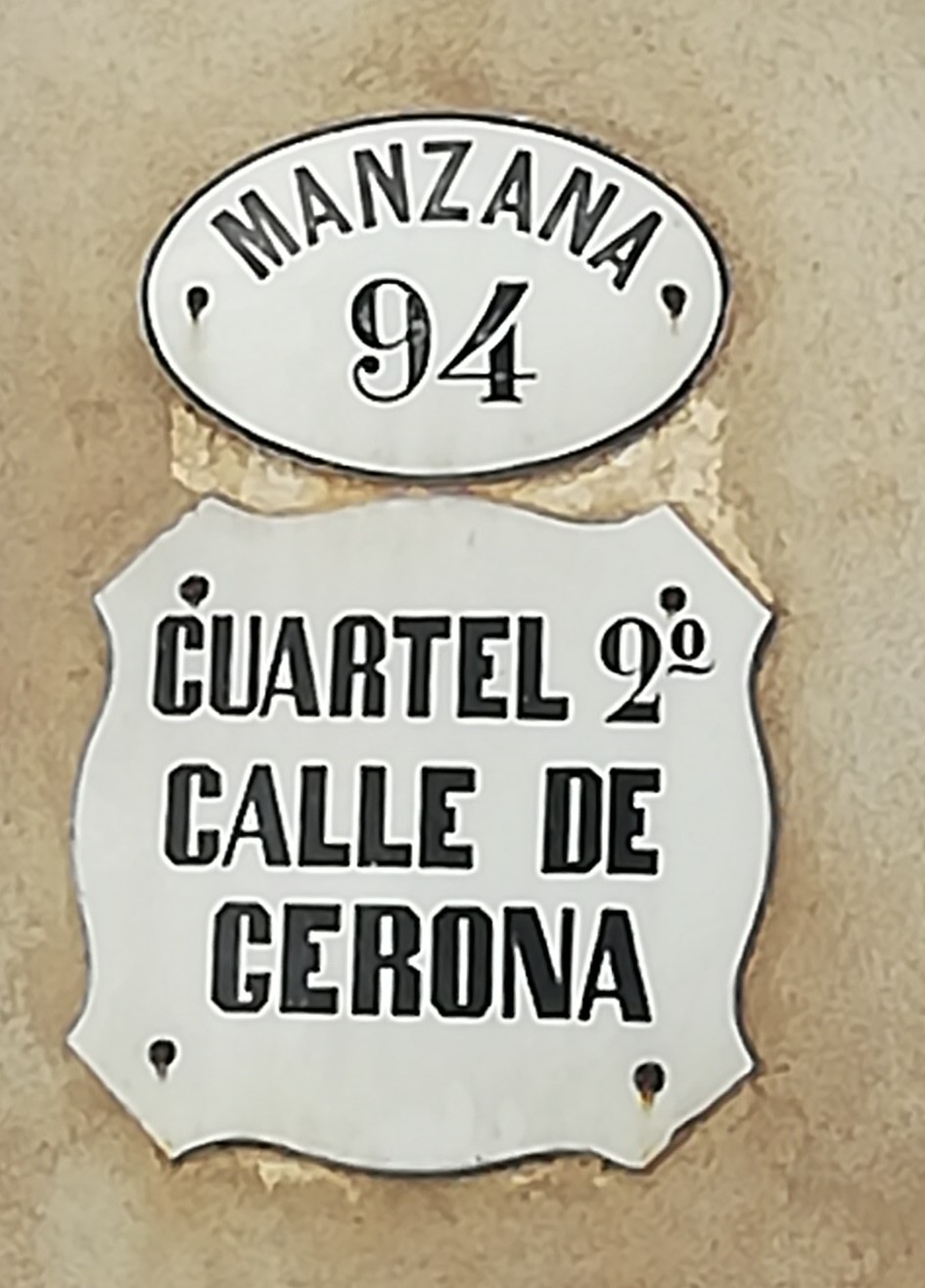
Street sign, Sant Feliu de Guíxols, Spain

A manzana is a unit of area used in Argentina and in many Central American countries, originally defined as 10,000 square varas in Spanish customary units. In other Spanish-speaking regions, the term has the meaning of a city block.

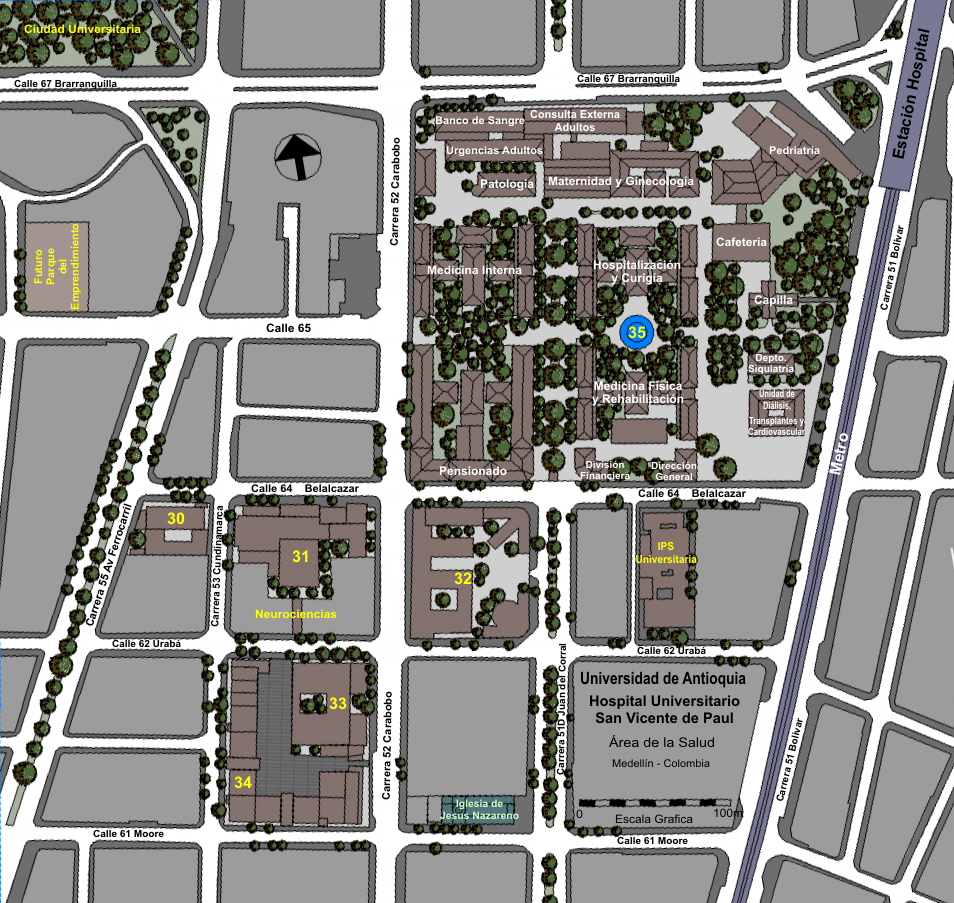
Plan of the health area of the Universidad de Antioquia, Medellín, Colombia (Note: While this map is not drawn to scale, the distribution and volume are consistent with the shape of the manzanas and buildings and the graphic scale is intuitively drawn based on the geography.)

Today its size varies between countries:

- In Argentina it is a hectare, 10,000 m^{2}.
- In most Central American countries it is about 7,000 m^{2} (1.7 acres), varying between countries.
- In Belize it is 8,353 m^{2} (2.064 acres).
- In Nicaragua it is 7,042.25 m^{2} (1.74018 acres).

If a vara is taken as 83.59 cm, then a manzana of 10,000 square varas is equal to 6,987.29 m^{2}. In calculations, the approximate value of 7000 m^{2} (or equivalently 0.7 ha) is often used to simplify conversion.

== See also ==
- acre
- Honduran units of measurement
