= Omani units of measurement =

A number of units of measurement were used in Oman.

== System before metric system ==
Several units were used.

=== Muscat ===
==== Length ====
One muscat was equal to 39.13 in.

==== Mass ====
Units included:

1 maund= 24 kotschas = 8 3/4 lb

1 candy = 60 maunds.

==== Capacity ====
One ferren was equal to 7.9254 gallons and also equal to 34 sidios.
