= Şinik (unit) =

Ottoman unit of volume

Şinik was an Ottoman unit of volume.

The origin of the term Şinik is obscure. It may be a corrupt word from Uigur Turkish şing (which was loaned from Chinese) or Kypchack Turkish şunik. During the 14th century some of the Anatolian Beyliks used this unit for trade with the Byzantines. They defined the unit as being equivalent to Greek unit choenix which is equal to 1.08 liters. But during the Ottoman era it was equal to 9.25 liters. However, in 1881 the şinik was redefined to be 10 liters. In 1926 during the Turkish Republic the unit became obsolete.
