= Endaze =

Ottoman unit of length

Endaze is a defunct measurement unit of length used in the Ottoman Empire.

Endaze means pace. But it is shorter than the pace. It was equal to 65.25 cm. It was usually used in the silk trade. Its sub unit was rubu and

$$1\quad  \text{rubu}= \frac {1}{8}\quad \text{endaze}$$
