= Philippine units of measurement =

A number of units of measurement were used in the Philippines to measure various quantities including mass, area, and capacity. The metric system has been compulsory in the country since 1860, during the late Spanish colonial period. A mixture of Spanish units and indigenous units were used alongside American units in the 1900s.

== Mass ==
Measurements of mass:

- 1 kurot/dakot = 5 grams
- 1 guhit = 100 grams
- 1 kagitna = 1/2 kilogram
- 1 chimanta = 6 kilograms
- 1 kaban = 50 kilograms

== Length ==
Measurements of length:

- 1 piranggot = 1/2 inch
- 1 sandamak = 4 inches
- 1 dangkal = 9 inches
- 1 talampakan = 12 inches = 1 foot
- 1 bisig = 16 inches
- 1 dipa = 68 inches

== Volume ==
Measurements of volume:

- 1 salok = 80 ml
- 1 saro = 250 ml
- 1 mangok = 400 ml
- 1 salop/ganta = 3 Liters (12 Gatang)
- 1 gatang = 250 ml
