= Kile (unit) =

Ottoman unit of volume

The kile (Ottoman Turkish: كيله) was an Ottoman unit of volume similar to a bushel, like other dry measures also often defined as a specific weight of a particular commodity. Its value varied widely by location, period, and commodity, from 8 to 132 oka. The 'standard' kile was 36 litres or 20 oka.
