= Somali units of measurement =

Units of measurement used in Somalia

A number of units of measurement have been used in Somalia to measure length, mass, area, capacity, and other such quantities. In 1950, Somalia adopted the metric system, which has been compulsory there since 1972.

== System before metric system ==
A number of units were used. These units were local and varied with materials and provinces.

=== Length ===
Several units were used to measure length. One top was equal to 3.92 m. One cubito was equal to 1/7 top.

=== Mass ===
A number of units were used to measure mass. One rottolo (pound) was equal to 0.448 kg. Some other units are given below:

1 okia (ounce) = 1/16 rottolo

1 frasla = 36 rottolo

1 gisla = 360 rottolo.

=== Area ===
One darat was equal to 8000 m^{2}.

=== Capacity ===
Two main systems, dry and liquid, were used.

==== Dry ====
Several units were used to measure dry capacity. One chela was equal to 1.359 L. Some other units were given below:

1 tabla = 15 chela

1 gisla = 120 chela.

==== Liquid ====
One caba was equal to 0.453 L.
