= Kadem =

Ottoman unit of length

Kadem (also ayak آیاق) is a defunct measurement unit used in the Ottoman Empire.

Kadem means "foot" and during the last years of the Ottoman Empire 1 kadem was set to be 30.48 cm (1.000 ft) in accordance with the British unit of length. But before the reign of Ottoman Sultan Selim III (r. 1789–1807), kadem had a different definition. Its value was either 36.6666 cm. or 37.8869 cm.

During the Atatürk's Reforms metric system was adopted in Turkey.
