= League (unit) =

Unit of length

A league is a unit of length. It was common in Europe and Latin America, but due to its highly inconsistent definition, it is no longer an official unit in any nation. Derived from an ancient Celtic unit and adopted by the Romans as the leuga, the league became a common unit of measurement throughout western Europe. Since the Middle Ages, values varied between countries, ranging from 2.2 to 7.9 km (1.4 to 4.9 mi).

It may have originally represented, roughly, the distance a person could walk in an hour.

== Definitions ==
=== Ancient Rome ===
The league was used in Ancient Rome, defined as 1½ Roman miles (7,500 Roman feet, modern 2.2 km or 1.4 miles). The origin is the leuga Gallica (also: leuca Callica), the league of Gaul.

=== Argentina ===
The Argentine league (legua) is 5.572 km (3.462 mi) or 6,666 varas: 1 vara is 0.83 m (33 in).

=== England ===
On land, the league is most commonly defined as three miles (4.83 km), although the length of a mile could vary from place to place as well as depending on the era. At sea, a league is three nmi (3.452 mi; 5.556 km). English usage also included many of the other leagues mentioned below (for example, in discussing the Treaty of Tordesillas).

The Battle Abbey Chronicles define a leuga (league) as the English leuga. This contains 12 roods, and 40 perches make a rood. The perch is 16 feet in length, so by this definition a league is 7,680 feet.

=== France ===
The French lieue—at different times—existed in several variants, namely 10,000, 12,000, 13,200 and 14,400 French feet, about 3.25 to 4.68 km (2.02 to 2.91 mi). It was used along with the metric system for a while, then discontinued.

A metric lieue was used in France from 1812 to 1840, with 1 metric lieue being exactly 4,000 metres (about 2.5 mi). It is this unit that is referenced in both the title and the body text of Jules Verne's novel Twenty Thousand Leagues Under the Seas (1870).

=== Mexico ===
In some rural parts of Mexico, the league (Spanish legua) is still used in the original sense of the distance that can be covered on foot in an hour, so that a league along a good road on level ground is a greater distance than a league on a difficult path over rough terrain.

=== Portugal ===
In Portugal, Brazil and other parts of the former Portuguese Empire, there were several units called league (Portuguese: légua):

- Légua of 18 to a degree = 6,172.84 metres
- Légua of 20 to a degree (Maritime légua) = 5,555.56 metres
- Légua of 25 to a degree = 4,444.44 metres

The names of the several léguas referred to the number of units that made the length corresponding to an angle degree of a meridian arc.

For compatibility after Portugal adopted the metric system, the metric légua of 5.0 km was used.

In Brazil, the léguas is still used occasionally, where it has been described as about 6.6 km.

=== Spain ===
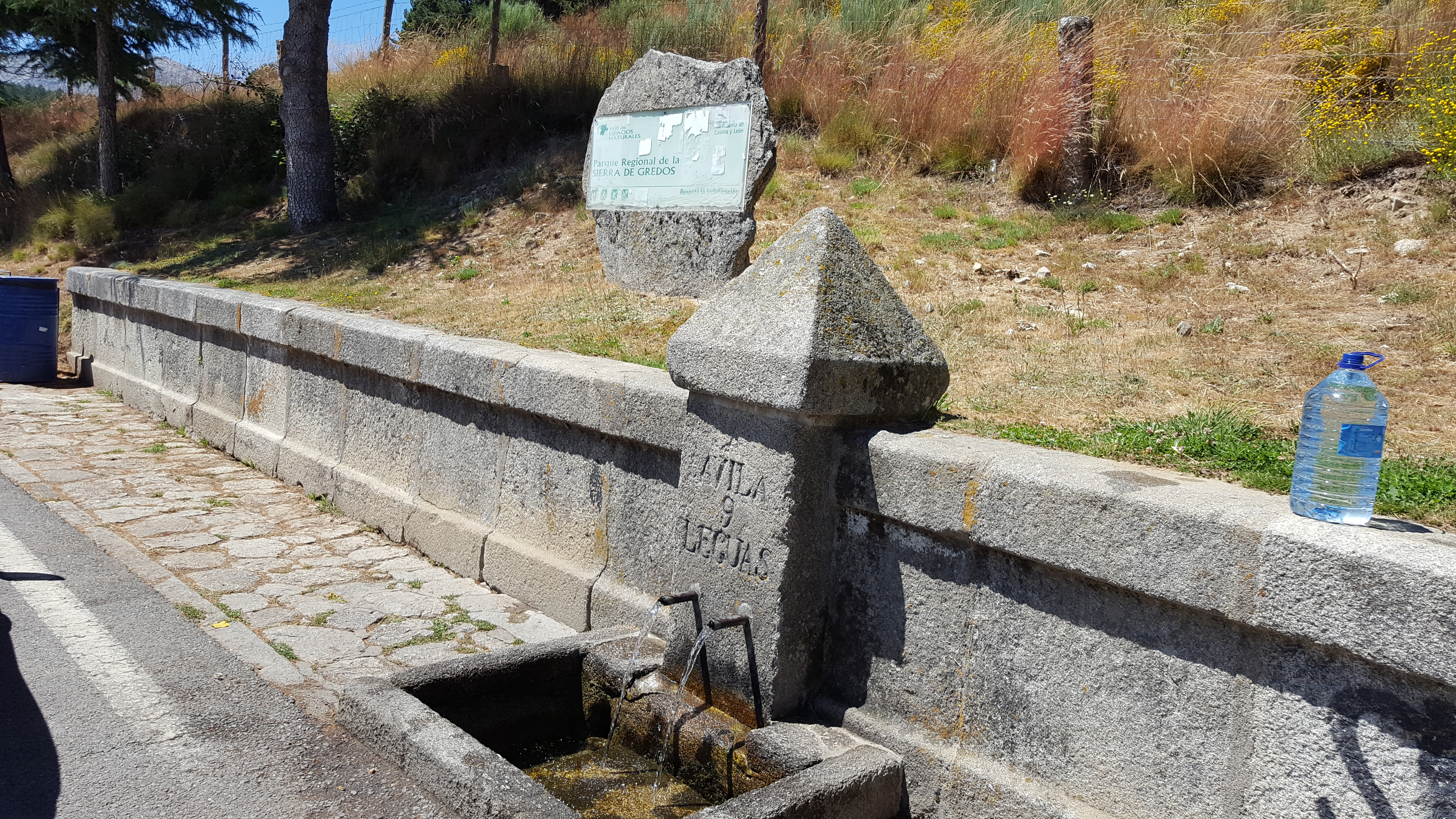
Milestone in the Province of Ávila, Spain indicating a distance of 9 leagues to the city of Ávila

The legal Spanish legua was originally understood as equivalent to 3 millas (Spanish miles). This varied depending on local standards for the pie (Spanish foot) and on the precision of measurement, but was officially equivalent to 4,180 metres (2.6 miles) before it was abolished by Philip II in 1568. Since 1568, the common league of 5,572.7 metres has been used. It remains in use in parts of Latin America, where its exact meaning varies.

- Legua náutica (nautical league): Between 1400 and 1600 the Spanish nautical league was equal to four Roman miles of 4,842 feet, making it 19,368 feet (5,903 metres or 3.1876 modern nautical miles). However, the accepted number of Spanish nautical leagues to a degree varied between 14 1/6 to 16 2/3, so in actual practice the length of a Spanish nautical league was 25,733 feet (4.235 modern nautical miles) to 21,874 feet (3.600 modern nautical miles) respectively.
- Legua de por grado (league of the degree): From the 15th century through the early 17th century, the Spanish league of the degree was based on four Arabic miles. Although most contemporary accounts used an Arabic mile of 6,444 feet (1,964 metres), which gave a Spanish league of the degree of 25,776 feet (7,857 metres or 4.242 modern nautical miles) others defined an Arabic mile as just 6,000 feet making a Spanish league of the degree 24,000 feet (or 7,315 metres, almost exactly 3.95 modern nautical miles).
- Legua geographica or geográfica (geographical league): Starting around 1630 the Spanish geographical league was used as the official nautical measurement and continued so through the 1840s. Its use on Spanish charts did not become mandatory until 1718. It was four millias (miles) in length. From 1630 to 1718 a millia was 5,564 feet (1,696 metres), making a geographical league of four millias equal 22,256 feet (6,784 m or 3.663 modern nautical miles). But from 1718 through the 1830s the millia was defined as the equivalent of just over 5,210 feet, giving a shorter geographical league of just over 20,842 feet (6,353 m or 3.430 modern nautical miles).
- Legua marítima (maritime league): From around 1840 through the early 20th century, a Spanish marine league equaled 18,263.52 feet (5,566.72 metres or 3.00579 modern nautical miles).

In the early Hispanic settlements of New Mexico, Texas, California, and Colorado, a league was also a unit of area, defined as 25 million square varas or about 4,428.4 acres. This usage of league is referenced frequently in the Texas Constitution. So defined, a league of land would encompass a square that is one Spanish league on each side.

== Comparison table ==
A comparison of the different lengths for a "league", in different countries and at different times in history, is given in the table below. Miles are also included in this list because of the linkage between the two units.

Length (m)	Name	Where used	From	To	Definition	Remarks
1,000	(for comparison)				1 kilometer	
1,280.16	kawtha	Myanmar		today	20 out-thaba	Myanmar units of measurement
1,482	mille passus, milliarium	Roman Empire				Ancient Roman units of measurement
1,486.6	miglio	Sicily				
1,500	Persian mile	Persia				
1,524	London mile	England				
1,609.3426	(statute) mile	England/UK	1592	1959	1,760 yards	Over the course of time, the length of a yard changed several times and consequently so did the English (and, from 1824, Imperial) mile. The statute mile was introduced in 1592 during the reign of Queen Elizabeth I
1,609.344	mile	some English speaking countries	1959	today	1,760 yards	On 1 July 1959, the imperial mile was standardized to an exact length in metres
1,609.3472	(statute) mile	United States	1893	today	1,760 yards	From 1959; also called the U.S. Survey Mile. From then its only utility has been land survey, before it was the standard mile. From 1893 its exact length in metres was: 3,600/3,937 × 1760
1 820		Italy				
1,852	nautical mile	international		today	1,852 m	Symbol: nmi; Abbreviation: NM
1,852.3	(for comparison)				1 meridian minute	
1,853.181	Turkish (nautical) mile	Turkey	1933	today		
1,855.4	(for comparison)				1 equatorial minute	Though the NM was defined on the basis of the minute, it varies from the equatorial minute, because at that time people could only estimate the circumference of the equator to be 40,000 km.
1,894.35	Ottoman mile	Ottoman Empire		1933	5,000 ayak	Ottoman units of measurement
2,065		Portugal				
2,220	Gallo-Roman league	Gallo-Roman culture			1 1/2 miles	Under the reign of Emperor Septimius Severus, this replaced the Roman mile as the official unit of distance in the Gallic and Germanic provinces, although there were regional and temporal variations.
2,470		Sardinia, Piemont				
2,622		Scotland				
2,880		Ireland				
3,780		Flanders				
3,898	French lieue (post league)	France, Haiti			2,000 "body lengths"	
4,000	French lieue	France	1812	1840	4,000 m exactly	This unit is referenced by Jules Verne's 1870 novel Twenty Thousand Leagues Under the Seas.
4,000	general or metric league					
4,179.5	legua antigua (old league)	Spain		1568		
4,190	legua	Mexico			= 2,500 tresas = 5,000 varas	
4,240	legua	Cuba			= 5,000 varas	
4,444.8	landleuge				1/25° of a circle of longitude	
4,452.2	lieue commune	France				Units of measurement in France before the French Revolution
4,514	legua	Chile,			= 36 cuadros = 5,400 varas	
4,531	Wegstunde	Saxony	1722	1840	1,000 Dresden rods	introduced on occasion of a countrywide road survey
4,808		Switzerland				
4,828	English land league Imperial league	England			3 miles	
4,800; 4,900	Germanic rasta, also doppelleuge (double league)					
5,000	legua	Paraguay				
5,000	légua nova	Portugal				
5,120.64	ga-wout (Burmese league)	Myanmar		today	4 kawtha	Myanmar units of measurement
5,196	legua	Bolivia			= 40 ladres	
5,152	legua argentina	Argentina, Buenos Aires			= 6,000 varas	
5,154	legua	Uruguay				
5,200	Bolivian legua	Bolivia				
5,370	legua	Venezuela				
5,500	Portuguese légua	Portugal				
5,510	Ecuadorian legua	Ecuador				
5,532.5	Landleuge (state league)	Prussia				
5,540	legua	Honduras				
5,556	Seeleuge (lit. "sea league" or nautical league)				1/20° of a circle of longitude 3 nautical miles	
5,572	legua	Colombia, Guatemala			= 3 millas	
5,572.7	legua	Peru			= 20,000 feet	
5,572.7	legua	Spain			= 4 millas = 20,000 feet	Spanish customary units
5,590	légua	Brazil			= 5,000 varas = 2,500 bracas	
5,600	Brazilian légua	Brazil				
5,685	Fersah (Turkish league)	Ottoman Empire		1933	3 Ottoman miles	Derived from Persian Parasang.
5,840	Dutch mile	Netherlands		1816		
6,197	légua antiga	Portugal			= 3 milhas = 24 estadios	
6,277		Luxembourg				
6,280		Belgium				
6,687.24	legua nueva (new league)	Spain	1766		= 8,000 Varas	
6,797	Landvermessermeile (state survey mile)	Saxony				
7,400		Netherlands		1816		
7,409	(for comparison)				4 meridian minutes	
7,419.2		Kingdom of Hanover				
7,419.4		Duchy of Brunswick				
7,420.4; 7,414.9		Bavaria				
7,420.439	geographic mile				1/15 equatorial grads	
7,421.6	(for comparison)				4 equatorial minutes	
7,448.7		Württemberg				
7,450		Hohenzollern				
7,467.6		Russia			7 werst	Obsolete Russian units of measurement
7,480		Bohemia				
7,500	kleine / neue Postmeile (small/new postal mile)	Saxony		1840		German Empire, North German Confederation, Grand Duchy of Hesse, Russia
7,532.5	Land(es)meile (German state mile)	Denmark, Hamburg, Prussia				primarily for Denmark defined by Ole Rømer
7,585.9	Postmeile (post mile)	Austria-Hungary				Austrian units of measurement
7,850		Romania				
8,800		Schleswig-Holstein				
8,888.89		Baden				
9,062	average Post- or Polizeimeile (middle post mile or police mile)	Saxony		1722		
9,206.3		Electorate of Hesse				
9,261.4	(for comparison)				5 meridian minutes	
9,277	(for comparison)				5 equatorial minutes	
9,323	alte Landmeile (old state mile)	Hanover		1836		
9,347	alte Landmeile (old state mile)	Hanover		1836		
9,869.6		Oldenburg				
10,000	metric mile, Scandinavian mile	Scandinavia				still commonly used today, e.g. for road distances.; equates to the myriametre
10,044	große Meile (great mile)	Westphalia				
10,670	peninkulma	Finland		1887		
10,688.54	mil	Sweden		1889		
11,113.7	(for comparison)				6 meridian minutes	
11,132.4	(for comparison)				6 equatorial minutes	
11,295	mil	Norway		1889		was equivalent to 3,000 Rhenish rods.

Similar units:

- 1,066.8 metres – verst, see also Obsolete Russian units of measurement
- 3,200 metres – kosh, used in North Bihar, India.

== See also ==
- Medieval weights and measures for various definitions of the league.
- List of obsolete units of measurement
- Portuguese customary units
- Spanish customary units
- Seven-league boots
- Walking
- Parasang
