= Mesures usuelles =

Old French measurement system

Mesures usuelles (French pronunciation: [məzyʁ yzɥɛl], customary measures) were a French system of measurement introduced by French Emperor Napoleon I in 1812 to act as compromise between the metric system and traditional measurements. The system was restricted to use in the retail industry and continued in use until 1840, when the laws of measurement from 1795 and 1799 were reinstituted.

== Rationale behind the new system ==
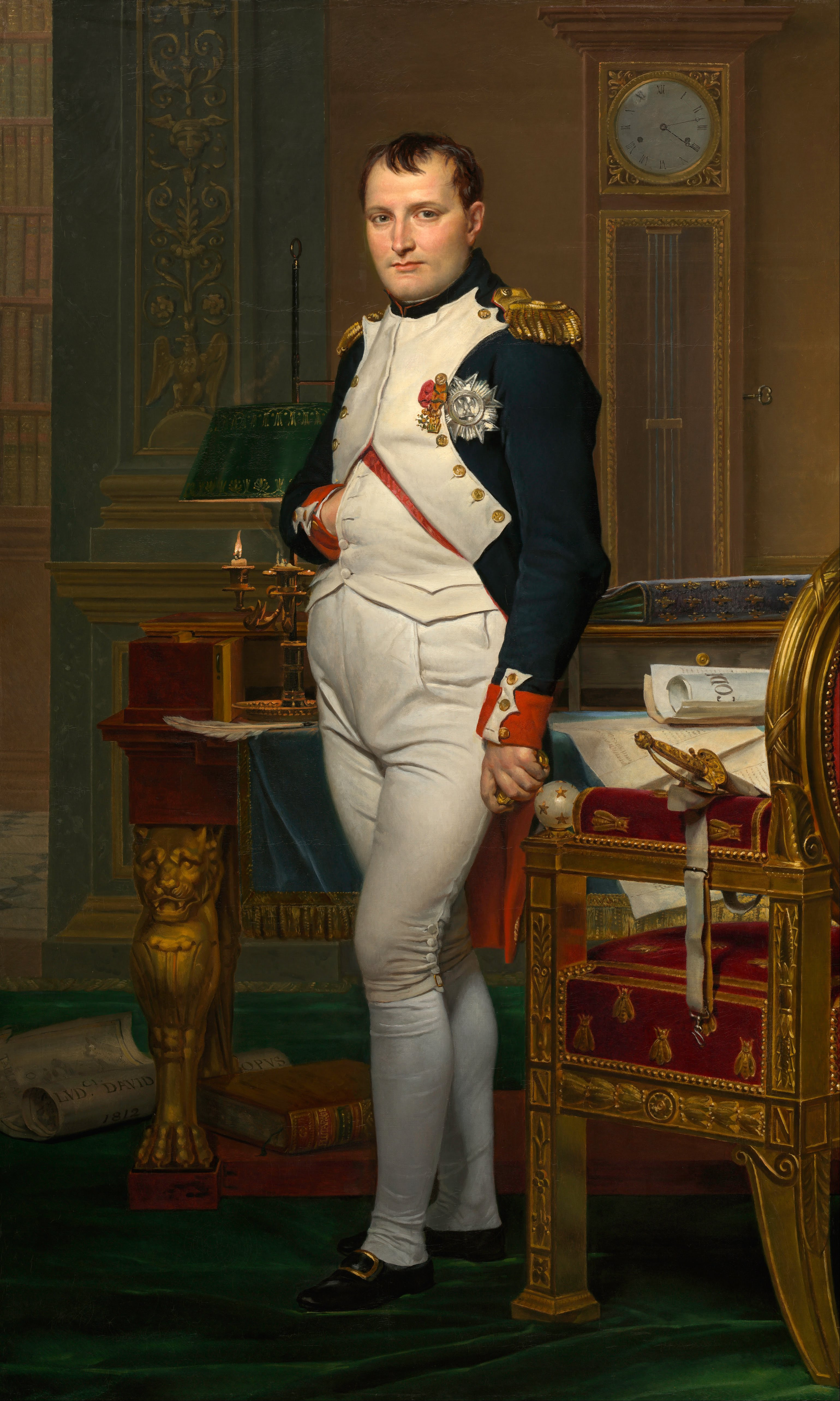
The ordinary measures were introduced by Napoleon I in 1812.

In the five years immediately before the French First Republic introduced the metric system, every effort was made to make the citizens aware of the upcoming changes and to prepare them for it. The administration distributed tens of thousands of educational pamphlets, private enterprise produced educational games, guides, almanacs, and conversion aids, and metre standards were built into the walls of prominent buildings around Paris. The introduction was phased by district over the next few years, with Paris being the first district to change. The government also realised that the people would need metre rulers, but they had only provided 25,000 of the 500,000 rulers needed in Paris as late as one month after the metre became the sole legal unit of measure. To compensate, the government introduced incentives for the mass-production of rulers. Paris police reported widespread flouting of the requirement for merchants to use only the metric system. Where the new system was in use, it was abused, with shopkeepers taking the opportunity to round prices up and to give smaller measures.

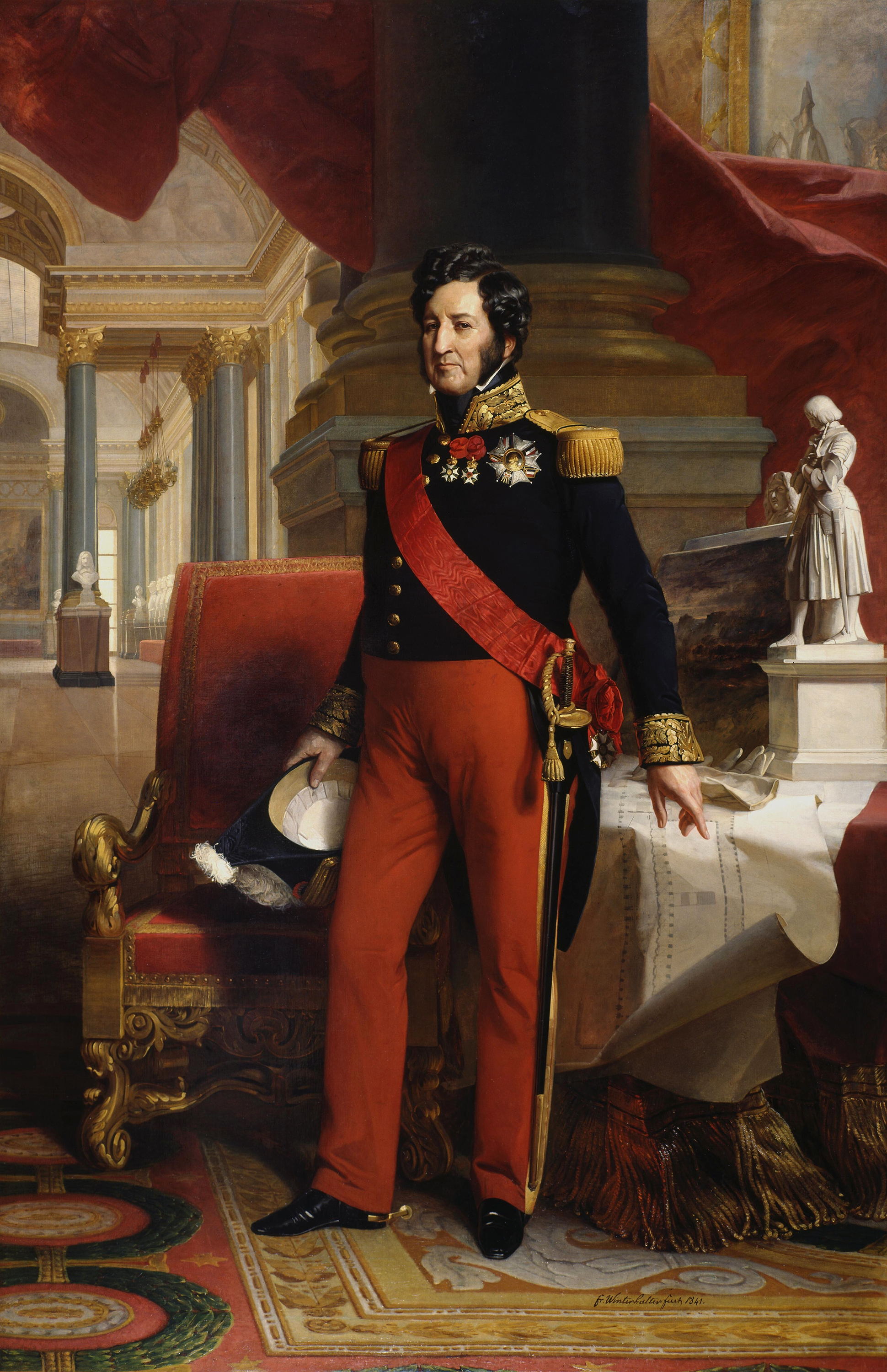
The mesures usuelles were abolished by Louis-Philippe I in 1839.

Napoleon I, the French Emperor, disliked the inconvenience of surrendering the high factorability of traditional measures in the name of decimalisation, and recognised the difficulty of getting it accepted by the populace. Under the décret impérial du 12 février 1812 (imperial decree of 12 February 1812), he introduced a new system of measurement, the mesures usuelles or "customary measures", for use in small retail businesses. However, all government, legal, and similar works still had to use the metric system and the metric system continued to be taught at all levels of education.

The prototypes of the metric unit, the kilogram and the metre, enabled an immediate standardisation of measurement over the whole country, replacing the varying legal measures in different parts of the country, and even more across the whole of Europe. The new livre (known as the livre métrique) was defined as five hundred grams, and the new toise (toise métrique) was defined as two metres. Products could be sold in shops under the old names and with the old relationships to one another, but with metric-based and slightly changed absolute sizes. This series of measurements was called mesures usuelles.

Napoleon's decree was eventually revoked during the reign of King Louis Philippe I by the loi du 4 juillet 1837 (law of 4 July 1837), which took effect on 1 January 1840, and reinstated the original metric system. This brought the system of mesures usuelles to a legal end, though the livre remains in some informal use to this day.

== Permitted units ==
The law authorised the following units of measure:

- The toise (fathom) was defined as exactly two metres and was as before divided into 6 pieds (or "feet") or 72 pouces (inches). The pouce was divided into 12 lignes (or "lines"). The pied and pouce, at precisely 333.3̅ mm and 27.7̅ mm, were about 2.6% larger than the previous Parisian measures and 9% larger than their English counterparts.
- The aune (ell), used to measure cloth, was defined as 120 centimetres, and divided into the demi aune (half an ell, or 60 cm) and the tiers aune (third of an ell, or 40 cm). It was 1.3% larger than l’aune de Paris (118.48 cm) and 5.0% larger than its English counterpart (45 inches; 114.3 cm).
- The litre was subdivided like a British quart, into demis (literally, "halves", being the equivalent of a pint of about sixteen fluid ounces), quarts (literally, "fourths", being the equivalent of a cup of about eight fluid ounces), huitièmes (literally, "eighths"), and seizièmes (literally, "sixteenths", of about two fluid ounces).
- The boisseau, (bushel), was redefined as being an eighth of a hectolitre and with associated measures double-boisseau, demi-boisseau and quart-boisseau (double, half, and quarter bushels respectively). The original boisseau, like the English bushel, varied depending on the commodity for which it was used, as well as the region where it was used.
- The livre, (pound), was defined as 500 grams, divided into 16 onces, (ounces), each once being divided into 8 gros. Each gros being thought of as being composed of 72 grains, whose name is the same as in English. Hence, the livre was 9216 grains. The livre and once were about 10% larger than their English counterparts, while the grain was 17% less than its English counterpart.

The mesures usuelles did not include any units of length greater than the toise - the myriamètre (10 km) remaining in use throughout this period.

== See also ==
- French units of measurement
- History of measurement
- History of the metric system
- International System of Units
- List of unusual units of measurement
- Metric system
- Systems of measurement
- Units of measurement
