= Kantar =

A kantar is the official Egyptian weight unit for measuring cotton. It corresponds to the US hundredweight, and is roughly equal to 99.05 pounds, or 45.02 kilograms. It is equal to either 157 kilograms of seed cotton or 50 kilograms of lint cotton.

== Etymology ==
The word entered English language in the 16th century, derived from Arabic qintār, from Late Greek kentēnarion (a weight of 100 pounds), from Late Latin centēnārium (from centum, 'hundred').

== See also ==
- Byzantine litra
- Centenarium
