= List of obsolete units of measurement =

Overview of outdated units of measurement

This is a list of obsolete units of measurement, organized by type. These units of measurement are typically no longer used, though some may be in limited use in various regions.

== Area ==
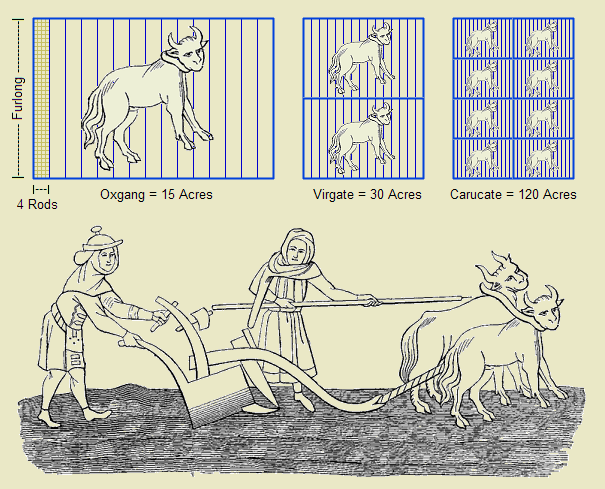
An overview of farm-derived units of measurement. Several of these are obsolete: the oxgang, the virgate, and the carucate.

- Antsingae – a unit of area, smaller than the bunarium.
- Bunarium (plural "bunaria") – a unit of area, equal to about 120 ares or 12,000 square metres
- Carucate
- Cawnie
- Decimal
- Dessiatin
- Ground
- Hide
- Juchart
- Jugerum
- Katha
- Lessa or Lecha
- Marabba
- Morgen
- Oxgang
- Pari – a unit of area equal to about 1 hectare
- Quinaria
- Tathe
- Virgate

== Energy, etc. ==
- Poncelet – unit of power
- Sthène – unit of force

== Length ==
=== Human scale (≤1.7 m) ===
Unit	Size	Origin	Notes
Ald	160–180 cm (63–71 in)	Mongolian	Mongolian equivalent of the fathom.
Alen, aln	59.38–62.77 cm (23.38–24.71 in)	Danish, Norwegian, Swedish	Scandinavian equivalent of the ell.
Aṅgula	1.763 cm (0.694 in)	Ancient Indian	
Arshin	68–75.774 cm (26.772–29.832 in)	Ottoman, Russian/Slavic	Related to the Turkish Arş.
Barleycorn	0.847 cm (0.333 in)	English	One-third of an inch.
Cana	157 cm (62 in)	Aragonese, Catalan	It is around the same value as the vara of Aragon, Spain, and Portugal.
Cubit	44.4–82.9 cm (17.5–32.6 in)	Anthropometric	Equivalent of the ell in the ancient world.
Macedonian cubit	35.6 cm (14.0 in)	Ancient Macedonian	
Ell	40.3–137.2 cm (15.9–54.0 in)	Germanic	Varies between the smallest German elle on the low end and the French aune at the high end.
Girah	5.72 cm (2.25 in)	Indian	
Gunter's link	20.1167652–20.1168402 cm (7.9199863–7.9200158 in)	English	Technically used until recently in US surveying.
Guz	61–104 cm (24–41 in)	Mughal, South Asian	
Hat'h	30.5–52 cm (12.0–20.5 in)	South Asian	
Jow, jacob	0.63 cm (0.25 in)	South Asian	
Ligne	0.0635–0.2256 cm (0.0250–0.0888 in)	French	Roughly equal to 9 points.
Line	0.064–0.254 cm (0.025–0.100 in)	English	Borrowed into other European systems as 1/12 inch (0.212-0.229 cm), except for the Russian liniya which used the largest definition (1/10 inch).
Lokot	45.7–54.7 cm (18.0–21.5 in)	Russian	Russian equivalent of the ell.
Pace	71–148 cm (28–58 in)	Anthropometric	
Palm	6.7–29.34 cm (2.64–11.55 in)	Anthropometric	Mostly remained between 6.7 and 8.8 cm until medieval European usage, during which it was more akin to a span.
Pes	29.5–30.1 cm (11.6–11.9 in)	Roman	
Pous	29.6–32.4 cm (11.7–12.8 in)	Ancient Greek	
Pyramid inch	2.094–2.543 cm (0.824–1.001 in)	Pseudo-Egyptian, English	Discredited speculative unit of length, believed to be equal to 1/25 of the sacred cubit or 1 1/1000 British inches.
Step	74–81 cm (29–32 in)	Roman	
Unglie	1.9 cm (0.75 in)	South Asian	
Vara	83.59–86.6 cm (32.91–34.09 in)	Spanish	

=== Greater than human scale (>1.7 m) ===
Unit	Size	Origin	Notes
Arabic mile	1.667–2.285 km (1.036–1.420 mi)	Ancient Arabic	
Bamboo	3.91–12.8 m (12.8–42.0 ft)	South Asian	Related to the dáin.
Dáin	3.9 km (2.4 mi)	South Asian, Burmese?	Also known as the Burmese league, possibly synonymous with the yojana.
Lachter	1.75–2.38 m (5 ft 9 in – 7 ft 10 in)	German mining industry	Usually used to measure depth, tunnel driving and the size of mining fields; also used for contract work. In mining in the German-speaking countries, it was the primary unit of length.
Parasang	3.9–6 m (13–20 ft)	Persian	
Rod	1.838–7.62 m (6 ft 0.4 in – 25 ft 0 in)	European	Standardized as 5.0292 m (16.500 ft) by the British Empire.
Siriometer	149,597,870,700,000 km (9.29558073×10^{13} mi)	Astronomical	Defined as 1 million AUs, or roughly twice the distance from Earth to Sirius.
Spat	1,000,000,000 km (620,000,000 mi)	Astronomical	
Stadion, stade	157–209 m (515–686 ft)	Ancient Greek	
Verst	1.067–1.49 km (0.663–0.926 mi)	Russian	
Yojana	3.5–20.5 km (2.2–12.7 mi)	Vedic	Its value was about 10 km (6.2 mi), although the exact value is disputed among scholars (commonly between 8 and 13 km or 5 and 8 mi).

== Luminosity ==
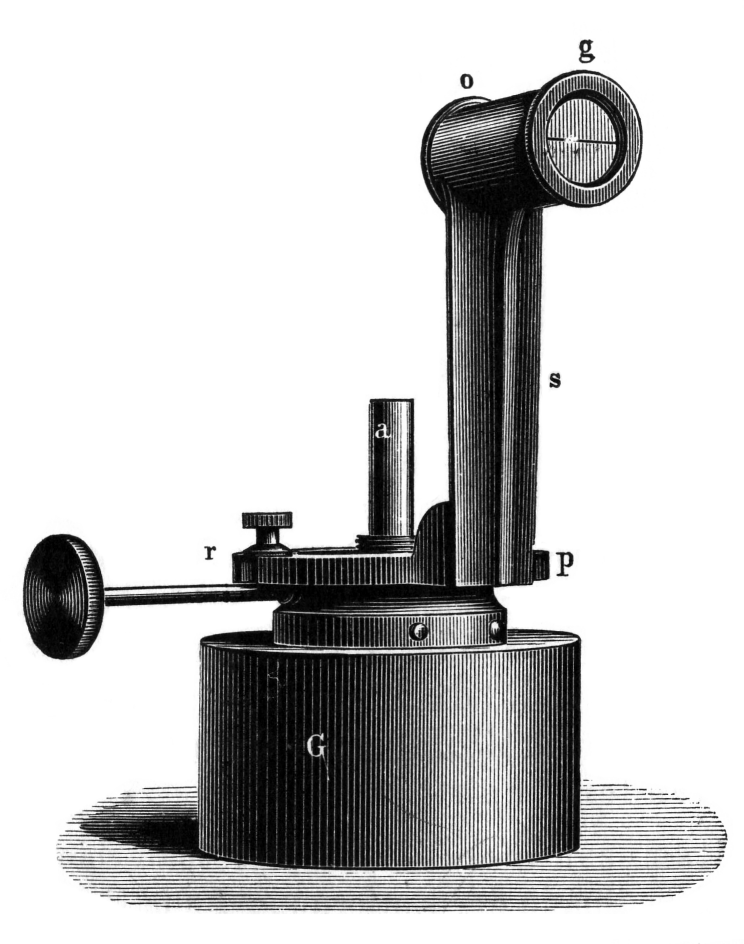
A Hefner lamp (German: Hefnerkerze)

- Carcel burner – an efficient lighting device used in the nineteenth century for domestic purposes and in France as the standard measure for illumination
- Carcel
- Hefner candle
- Violle

== Mass or weight ==
- Abucco – in Bago, Myanmar, this was a unit of mass used for gold and silver. It was approximately 196.44 grams or 6.316 troy ounces.
- Arroba – an Iberian unit of weight, equivalent to 11.5 kg (25 lb)
- Buddam
- Candy
- Corgee – an obsolete unit of mass equal to 212 moodahs, or rush mat bundles of rice. The unit was used in the Canara (now Kanara) region of Karnataka in India.
- Cullingey
- Dharni
- Dirham
- Duella
- Dutch cask – a British unit of mass, used for butter and cheese. Equal to 112 lb (51 kg).
- Esterling
- Faggot – has multiple meanings in metrology. As relevant to this article, it was a unit of mass, being 120 lb (54 kg).
- Grzywna
- Keel – a UK unit of mass for coal, equaling 21,540.19446656 kg (47,488.0000000 lb)
- Large sack – a unit of mass equal to 2 (new) sacks
- Long ton
- Lot
- Mark
- Munjandie
- Oka
- Pao
- Passeree – a unit of mass equal to about 4.6 kg (10.1412640605 lb)
- Pennyweight
- Pood
- Roll – a U.K. unit of mass for butter and cheese equal to 24 oz (680 g)
- Room – a U.K. unit of mass of coal equivalent to 15,680 lb (7,110 kg)
- Sarpler
- Ship load
- Slug
- Talent – a unit of mass in the tens of kg
- Tank
- Tod
- Truss – a unit of mass used to describe a tight bundle of hay or straw. It would usually be a cuboid, for storage or shipping, and would either be harvested into such bundles or cut from a large rick.
- Whey – a unit of mass used for butter and cheese
- Zentner
- Zolotnik

== Temperature ==
- Delisle scale
- Leiden scale
- Newton scale – a temperature scale devised by Isaac Newton in 1701.
- Réaumur scale
- Rømer scale
- Wedgwood scale

== Volume (dry or liquid) ==
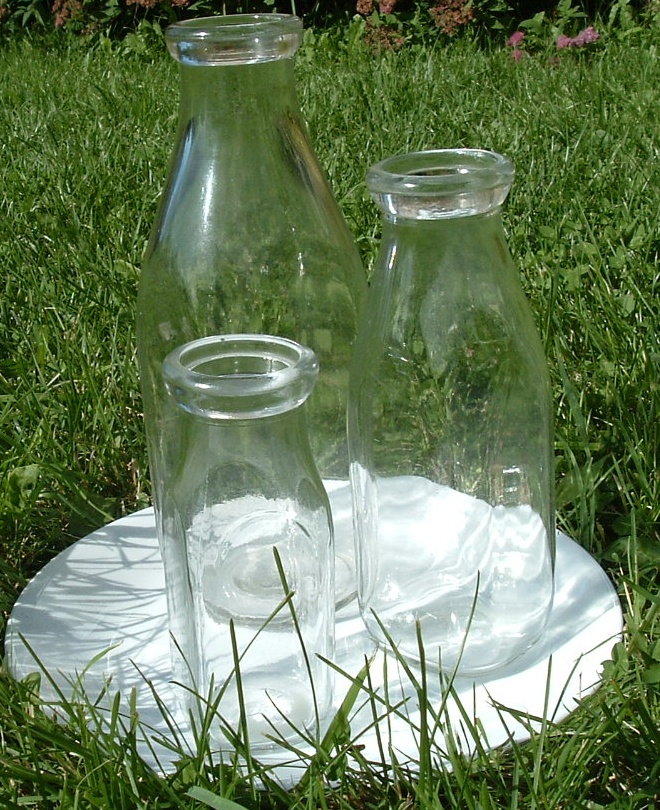
Glass milk bottles from 1950s Quebec. From largest to smallest, they are a pinte (quart), a chopine (pint), and a demiard (half-pint). The latter was used for cream.

- Acetabulum
- Adowlie
- Amphora
- Aum
- Belshazzar
- Botella − Spanish for "bottle", which has been given various standard capacities at different times and places, and for different fluids. Often-cited figures include 0.95 liters in Cuba (1796), 0.75 liters in Cuba (1862) and 0.7 liters in Colombia (1957).
- Bucket
- Butt
- Chungah
- Congius
- Coomb
- Cord-foot – a U.S. unit of volume for stacked firewood with the symbol cd-ft, equal to 16 ft^{3} (0.45 m^{3})
- Cotyla
- Cran
- Cullishigay
- Deal – a former U.K. and U.S. unit of volume for stacked firewood. A U.K. deal equaled 7 ft × 6 ft × 2 1/2 in (178 mm × 1,829 mm × 64 mm; 20.8 l), while a U.S. deal equaled 12 ft × 11 in × 1 1/2 in (3,658 mm × 279 mm × 38 mm; 38.8 l).
- Demiard – an old French unit of volume. When France metricated, it survived in Louisiana and Quebec. The demiard eventually became associated with the American and British half-pint rather than French units.
- Firlot
- Hekat
- Hogshead
- Homer
- House cord – a former U.S. unit of volume for stacked firewood
- Kile
- Koku
- Lambda – an uncommon metric unit of volume discontinued with the introduction of the SI
- London quarter
- Lump of butter – used in the U.S. up to and possibly after the American Revolution. It equaled "one well rounded tablespoon".
- Masu
- Metretes
- Octave
- Omer
- Pau
- Peck – the name of two different units of volume, one imperial and one U.S. Both equaled about 9 litres.
- Puddee
- Salt spoon – used in the U.S., up to and possibly after the American Revolution. Four salt spoons equaled one teaspoon.
- Seah
- Ser
- Shipping ton – a unit of volume defined as 50 ft^{3} (1.4 m^{3})
- Stuck
- Wineglass – used in the U.S., up to and possibly after the American Revolution. One wineglass equaled 1/4 cup.

== Other ==
- Apothecaries' system
- Atom (time) – a hypothetical unit of time used in the Middle Ages
- Bahar – a unit of length in Iran and a unit of mass in Oman
- Batman – mostly a unit of mass, but sometimes a unit of area
- Demal – unit of concentration
- Dimi (metric prefix) – a discontinued non-SI metric prefix for 10^{−4}
- Einstein – unit of energy, and a unit of amount of substance
- Fanega – a unit of dry volume, and a unit of area
- Fresnel – a unit of frequency
- Garce – a unit of dry volume in India, and a unit of mass in Sri Lanka
- Hobbit – a unit of volume, or, more rarely, of weight
- Kula – a unit of area in India and a unit of mass in Morocco
- Last – a unit of mass or volume
- League – usually a unit of length, but sometimes a unit of area
- Mache
- Mesures usuelles
- Perch – most commonly a unit of area, but sometimes a unit of length or volume
- Pièze – a unit of pressure
- Quibi – a unit of time equal to 10 minutes. First used in Quibi's own Super Bowl LIII advertising campaign, this word saw small amounts of ironic adoption.
- Rood – a unit of area or length
- Sack – originally a medieval unit of mass, equal to 26 stone (364 pounds, or about 165 kg). It has since been a unit of dry volume, equal to 24 imperial gallons (about 109 liters).
- Schoenus – a unit of area or length
- Scrupulum – a unit of area, mass, or time
- Seam – a unit of mass or volume
- Seer – a unit of mass or volume
- Toise – a unit of area, length, or volume
- Tub – usually a unit of mass, but sometimes a unit of volume
- Uncia – an ancient Roman unit of length, mass, or volume
- Wey – a unit of mass or volume
- Winchester measure – a system of volume measurement

== See also ==
- Dimensional metrology
- Forensic metrology
- Smart Metrology
- Time metrology
- Quantum metrology
- Hair's breadth
- Hindu units of time
- History of measurement
- List of humorous units of measurement
- List of non-coherent units of measurement
- List of scientific units named after people
- Medieval weights and measures
- Muggeseggele
- System of measurement

=== By geography ===
- Ancient Arabic units of measurement
- Ancient Egyptian units of measurement
- Ancient Greek units of measurement
- Ancient Mesopotamian units of measurement
- Ancient Roman units of measurement
- Danish units of measurement
- Obsolete Finnish units of measurement
- Obsolete German units of measurement
- History of measurement systems in India
- Japanese units of measurement
- List of customary units of measurement in South Asia
- Maltese units of measurement
- Obsolete Polish units of measurement
- Obsolete Russian units of measurement
- Obsolete Scottish units of measurement
- Obsolete Tatar units of measurement
- Old Cornish units of measurement
- Old Irish units of measurement
- Ottoman units of measurement
- Persian units of measurement
- Portuguese customary units
- Roman timekeeping
- Spanish customary units
- Tamil units of measurement
