= List of customary units of measurement in South Asia =

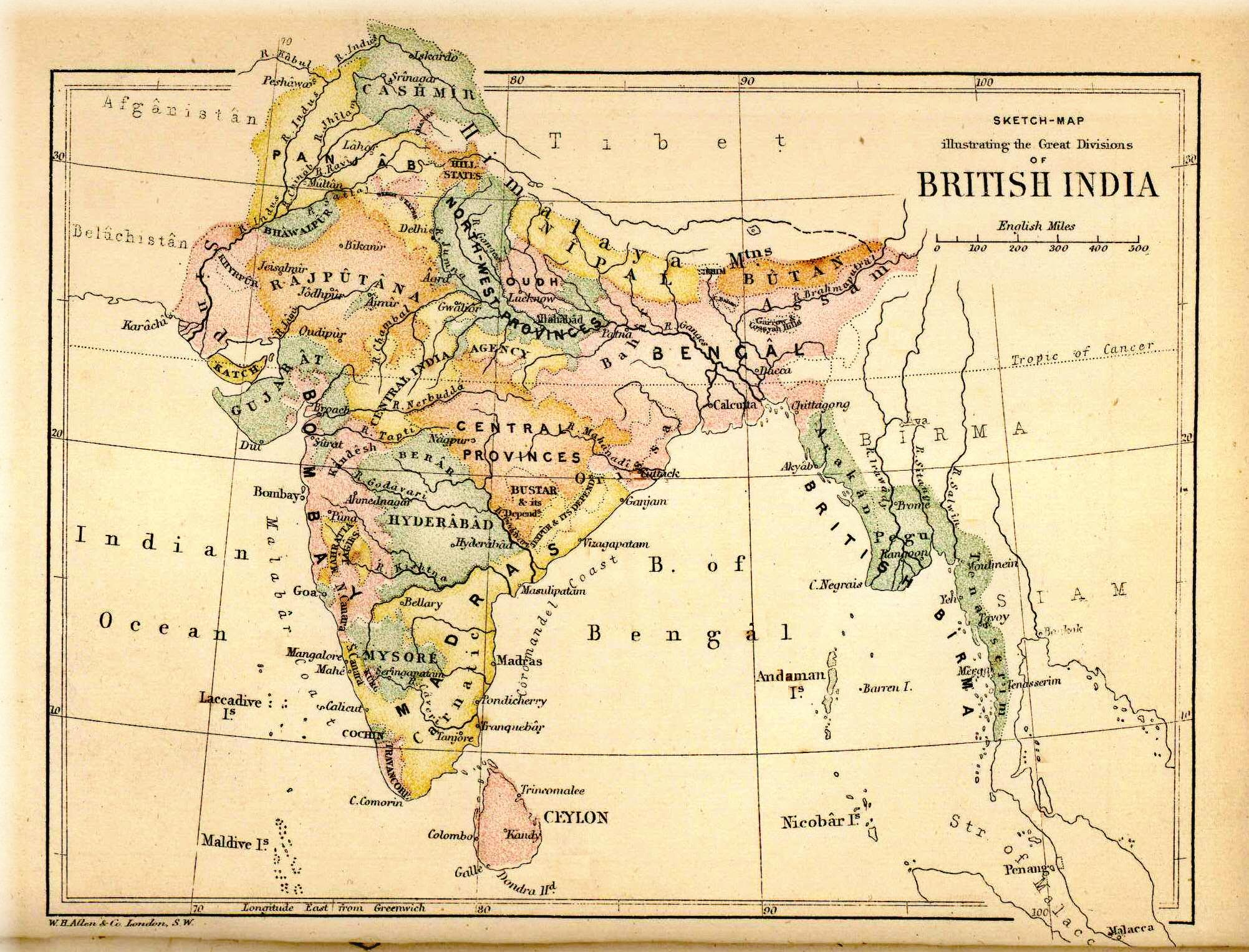
This 1880 sketch map shows the approximate geographical extent of British administration in South Asia, and hence the influence of imperial units, at that time.

The origins of the customary units of measurement in South Asia are varied. As in Europe, there were various local systems of everyday measurements of length, mass and dry volume (the latter being a de facto measure of mass for many staple grains), while gold, pearls and gemstones were weighed on a different, slightly more standardized scale. Several of the more important units were cognate with units of measurement in the Arabian Peninsula to the West or in China to the East, to facilitate trade.

During the period of British India, these South Asian units cohabited with imperial units. Some South Asian customary units were redefined in terms of imperial Units by an Ordinance of 1833, and several gained sufficient currency among the colonial population to be listed in the first edition of the Oxford English Dictionary. An early attempt was made at metrication with the Indian Weights and Measures of Capacity Act, 1871, but this had still not been implemented in practice in 1922.

Full metrication with the passage of the Standards of Weights and Measures Act, 1956, now replaced by the Standards of Weights and Measures Act, 1976: these Acts quote the legal conversion factors for imperial units to SI units. Exact conversions can be made for customary units if they had previously been defined in terms of imperial units: however, even when legally defined, the value of a unit could vary between different localities.

== Units of length ==
- bahar
- bamboo
- girah
- guz
- hat'h
- jow
- sana lamjel
- unglie
- yojana
- Krosha / Kos (also as cosses in English writing)

== Units of volume ==
- chungah
- maund
- pau
- seer
- ser

== Units of area ==
- ankanam
- bigha
- cawnie
- cent or decimal
- ground
- guntha
- katha
- kula
- lessa
- marabba

== Units of mass ==
- adowlie
- bahar
- Bhori
- buddam
- candy
- corgee
- cullingey
- garce
- maund
- masha
- munjandie
- passeree
- ratti
- seer
- tank
- tola

== Units of dry volume ==
- adowlie
- cullishigay
- garce
- puddee

== See also ==
- Indian numbering system
- Nepalese customary units of measurement
