= Goregaon (Raigad) =

- Town
- Location in Maharashtra, India
- Coordinates: 18.17°N 73.3°E
- Country: India
- State: Maharashtra
- District: Raigad
- Elevation: 28 m (92 ft)

Population (2011)
  - Total: 7,155

Languages
  - Official: Marathi
- Time zone: UTC+5:30 (IST)

Goregaon is a census town in Raigad district in Maharashtra state. It is situated 18 km away from the Raigad fort, the capital of Chhatrapati Shivaji Maharaj's kingdom. For many years, Goregaon has served as a cultural and educational center for surrounding areas in the region. Situated near the Kal River, a tributary of the Savitri River. Goregaon enjoys an abundance of water and natural features. Goregaon (Ghodegaon) is likely the ancient Hippokura (Ghodekula) trade centre mentioned in Ptolemy's writings (A. D. 150).

== Geography ==
Goregaon is located in the south-west of India at 18.17°N 73.3°E. The average elevation is 28 metres (92 ft).

Formerly known as Ghodegaon, Goregaon is an inland port in the Mangaon taluka. It lies near the Kal River, about 6 miles (9.7 km) northwest of Dasgaon and 2 miles (3.2 km) south of the Kal's junction with the Ghod River, at the tidewaters of the Savitri River. The town utilizes the Kal as a source of hydroelectric energy.

Boats weighing approximately 12 tons (50 khandi) pass through Goregaon, but river travel has diminished in recent times.

The Konkan-Goa State Highway has facilitated economic and easy transport of goods to all parts of the country.

== Demographics ==
As of the 2011 Indian census, Goregaon had a population of 7,155. Goregaon has an average literacy rate of 91%, higher than the national average of 82.4%; with 95.18% of the males and 87.76% of females literate. 10.34% of the population is under 6 years of age.

== History ==
=== As Ptolemy's Hippokura ===
Ptolemy (Bertius's Edition, 198, 205) mentions two Hippokuras: one on the coast, the other inland. The inland Hippokura is believed to be the capital of Baleokuros, which Professor Bhandarkar, in a manuscript, identifies with the Vidivayakuras, a branch of the Satakarnis who ruled at Kolhapur. No name of Kolhapur resembling Hippokura has been discovered.

Ptolemy lists Balipatna and Hippokura south of Symulla or Ceul. Of these, Balipatna is most likely Palepattan or the city of Pale, which is a modern village possessing Buddhist caves measuring approximately 2 miles (3.2 km) in length to the northwest of Mahad. Hippokura is supposedly Ghodbunder in Salsette. However, Ghodeganv seems more likely to be Ghodbunder, as its position is at the limit of navigation on the northern branch of the Banakot River, making it also a likely early center of trade. Hippokura was the headquarters of a small division until 1718 AD. Afterwards, it was ceded to the Pesava by the Habsi, and at that time was to have been burned more than once to the ground.

=== Modern settlement ===
Goregaon was originally called Ghodegaon, a name that was formed by combining the word ghode (meaning "horse") and gaon (meaning "village"). This name was used because Goregaon was a major trading center for horses under the rule of Chatrapati Shivaji. 10 kilometres (6.2 mi) from Goregaon is the village of Ghodeghoom. In ancient times, warriors would train in Ghodeghoom and travel to Goregaon to purchase horses. Three lakes in Goregaon could provide the water needed for the horses in the market.

The village has three water tanks dating back from the ancient times. They are: (1) Gaotalav occupying an area of 12 acres (49,000 m^{2}); (2) Visnu Talav, with a haud, or tank, in the center and occupying 8 acres (32,000 m^{2}) of land; and (3) Ram Talav spread over an area of 4 acres (16,000 m^{2}). Due to the availability of water the Maratha armies used to camp at Goregaon, and the nearby villages of Vaki and Hindus.

In 1826, Ghodegaon is mentioned as the terminus of two routes from Poona via the Dev and Kumbha passes. It has an outlying country town, or kasha, with 500 houses and 40 shops along with some temples and wells (Clunes' Itinerary, p. 40).

Since 1955, a plan to supply water through pipes has been implemented at the cost of ₹400,000 (US$4,200). The water supply is ensured by putting a dam across the river Kal half a mile upstream. The plan was approved in order to provide the village with electricity by the end of 1961.

In memory of the late Vaman Malhar Joshi, a celebrated Marathi writer, a building was erected which houses a library called Jnyana Vikas Vachanalaya. It is recognised as the taluka library and contains many books in English and Marathi, along with daily and weekly newspapers and magazines.

More recently, an NGO called SHARE (Services for the Health in Asian ＆ African Regions) has set up its office in the Madina complex on Goregaon Shrivardhan Road, in Goregaon. Villagers from 5 talukas, including Mangaon, visit Goregaon to meet with SHARE officials.

== Temples ==
Among the old temples in Goregaon, the temple of Mallikarjuna, or Siddhesvar, is thought to have been built approximately 800 years ago. The shrine is said to be self-originated or Swayambhu. Situated on the top of the hill and bordering the town on the north, it is 413 feet (126 m) in height.

The Shree Viththal Mandir was constructed in 1752 and has fine specimens of sculptures and carvings on its wooden pillars. The existence of Srichakra marks is another distinguishing feature of this temple.

To the north of the town, on a descent, there is the dargah of Daud Malik, a well-known Muslim Fir.

On the border of Goregaon is the Samaj Samata Mandir Hall, and Lord Buddha's Temple. The hall and temple are a beautiful example of Sarva Dharma Sama Bhava. It is said that the temple and Samaj Samata Mandir were built by Panchsheel Buddha Jana Seva Samiti's Goregaon Vibhag. The late Chandrakant Adhikari—advocate; the first sarpanch of Goregaon village, serving for 12 years; colleague of B. R. "Babasaheb" Ambedkar, in his Khoti abolition movement; and Dalit Mitra awardee—was a force behind the Samaj Samata Mandir and temple project. He devoted many years to this project, despite being over 75 years old. Since 1980, people from all castes and creeds have also contributed. The project and hall are useful for multiple purposes as they are located on the state highway to Shriwardhan.

== Education ==
=== Schools ===
N. M. Joshi Vidyabhavan is an upper primary to higher secondary co-educational school in Goregaon. The school was established in 1945 and serves approximately 4000 students.

The Anjuman Khairul Islam (A. K. I.) Urdu High School and Junior College is managed by the AKI Trust, Mumbai.

The Secular Education Trust, Goregaon, operates three schools: Zainab Tobaccowala Secular School (English medium) from 1st to 10th standard, Chandrakant Adhikari Vidyalaya (Marathi medium) from 8th to 10th standard, and Karuna Kindergarten (pre-school to kindergarten).

=== Colleges near Goregaon ===
- M. T. E. S. Doshi Vakil Arts & G. C. U. B. Science & Commerce College
- Dr. Babasaheb Ambedkar Technological University is just 3 miles (4.8 km) from Goregaon.
