= Jow =

Jow or JOW may refer to:

- Jow (unit), an obsolete unit of length in India
- Jow or Jow.fr, an application and a website for recipes meal planning and smart grocery shopping, created in 2017.
- Jo L. Walton (born 1982), British poet also publishing as Jow Lindsay
- Jowulu language
- Malese Jow (born 1991), American actress and singer-songwriter
- Zhou (surname)
