= Hath =

Hath may refer to:

- Hat'h, an obsolete unit of length in India
- Hath (Doctor Who), a Doctor Who alien
- Hath (sport shooter) (born 1964), Laotian sports shooter
- hath, an obsolete form of has; see English verbs
