= Indonesian units of measurement =

Units of measurement used in Indonesia

A number of units of measurement were used in Indonesia to measure length, mass, capacity, etc. Metric system adopted in 1923 and has been compulsory in Indonesia since 1938.

== System before metric system ==
Old Dutch and local measures were used under Dutch East Indies. Local measures were very variable, and later they have been legally defined with their metric equivalents.

=== Length ===
A number of units were used to measure length. One depa was equal to 1.70 m by its legal definition. Some other units and their legal equivalents are given below:

1 hasta = 1/4 depa

1 kilan = 1/8 depa.

=== Mass ===
A number of units were used to measure mass.

==== Ordinary ====
One pikol (or one pecul) was equal to 61.7613025 kg by its legal definition. Some other units and their legal equivalents are given below:

1 thail = 1/1,600 pikol

1 catti = 1/100 pikol

1 kabi = 1/100 pikol

1 kulack = 0.0725 pikol

1 amat = 2 pikol

1 small bahar = 3 pikol

1 large bahar = 4.5 pikol

1 timbang = 5 pikol

1 kojang (Batavia) = 27 pikol = 1,667.555 kg

1 kojang (Semarang) = 28 pikol = 1,729.316 kg

1 kojang (Soerabaya) = 30 pikol = 1,852.839 kg.

==== For precious metals ====
One thail (tael) was equal to 54.090 kg by its legal definition. Some other units and their legal equivalents are given below:

1 wang = 1/48 thail

1 tali = 1/16 thail

1 soekoe = 1/8 thail

1 reaal = 1/2 thail.

==== For opium ====
One thail was equal to 38.601 kg by its legal definition. Some other units and their legal equivalents are given below:

1 tji = 1/10 thail

1 tjembang Mata = 1/1,000 thail

1 hoen = 1/1,000 thail.

=== Area ===
Several units were used to measure area. One bahoe (or 1 bouw) was equal to 7,096.5 m^{2} and lieue^{2} (Geographic) was equal to 55.0632 km by its legal definition.

=== Capacity ===
Two systems, dry and liquid, were used to measure capacity.

==== Dry ====
Several units were used to measure dry capacity. One kojang was equal to 2,011.2679 L by its legal definition. One pikol was equal to 1/30 kojang.

==== Liquid ====
A number of units were used to measure liquid capacity. Some other units and their legal equivalents are given below:

1 takar (for oil) = 25.770 L

1 kit (for oil) = 15.159 L

1 koelak (for oil) = 3.709 L

1 kan (for various products) = 1.575 L

1 mutsje (for various products) = 0.1516 L

1 pintje (for oil) = 0.0758 L.

=== Sumatra ===
Several local units were used in Sumatra.

==== Length ====
Units for length included:

1 etto = 2 jankal

1 hailoh = 2 etto

1 tung = 4 hailoh = 12 feet.

==== Capacity ====
Units for capacity included:

1 koolah = 2.1173 bushel

1 pakha = 0.14535 gallon.

==== Mass ====
Units for mass included:

1 catty = 2.118 lb

1 maund = 77 lb

1 pecul = 133 1/3 lb

1 candil = 423 1/2 lb

1 ootan (for camphor) = 4 lb.

=== Java ===
Several local units were used in Java. Old Dutch units too were in use, and other units were varied for example one town to another.:

==== Length ====
One covid was equal to 3/4 yard and other units were Dutch.

==== Mass ====
Units for mass included:

1 gantang (for coffee) = 10 catties

1 pecul = 100 catties = 135.6312 lb

1 bahar (at Bantam) = 396 lb

1 bahar (at Bantam; used for pepper) = 406.78 lb

1 bahar (at Batavia) = 610.17 lb

1 timbang (for grain) = 677.9625 lb

1 tael (at Bantam) = 0.1511 lb

1 tael (at Batavia) = 0.0847 lb.

==== Capacity ====
Units for capacity included:

1 kanne = 0.394 gallons

1 legger (for arrack) = 160.0 gallons

1 bambou (at Bantam) = 0.09223 bushels

1 koyang = 147.568 bushels

1 koyang (at Batavia; measure for rise) = 62432 bushels.

=== Celebes (Modern Sulawesi) ===
Units were resemble or identical with the units of neighbouring islands under Netherlands.

==== Mass ====
One pecul was equal to 135.64 lb.

=== Molucca Islands ===
Dutch units and other units resembling the units in Java, Sumatra, etc. were used.

==== Amboyna ====
===== Mass =====
Units included:

1 bahar = 597.61 lb

Sus1 mace = 28 1/2 grain

1 tael = 55.3371 bushel.

==== Ternate ====
===== Mass =====
One catty was equal to 1.3017 lb.
