= Pao (unit) =

The pao is a unit of dry measure (mass) which is used in South Asia. The name may come from the Punjabi ਪਾਓ páo, which was a traditional charge of one quarter of a seer per every maund of grain that was weighed, converted into a tax by Sawan Mal. Turner also cites a Sindhi word pāu (پاءُ) meaning a quarter of a seer.

The pao was recorded in the Bengal Presidency in 1850, but was not considered to be an integral part of the local system of weights. It was equal to four chitaks, and hence a quarter of a seer: the equivalent Imperial weight at the time was given as 7 oz. 10 dwt. Troy (233.3 grams). The use of a quarter-seer weight in Ahmedabad had also been noted in a British East India Company survey of South Asian metrology carried out in 1821: the name of the unit was not recorded, but it would have been equivalent to 4 oz. 3 dr. 17 gr. avoirdupois (119.8 grams) based on the measurement of the Ahmedabad seer. It is still occasionally used in northern India.

In Nepal, the pao (Nepali: पाउ, romanized: pāu) was 1/12 of a dharni, and equivalent to about 194.4 grams in 1966. Convenient "pau" units of both 200 grams and 250 grams are in current use in retail sales in different parts of the country.

In Pakistan, the pao was slightly heavier, at 233.3 grams.

As to Afghanistan, it was reported in 1950 that 1 pao ≈ 1 lb (450 grams) in Kabul, with four paos to one charak and sixteen paos to a seer.
