= Adowlie =

Indian unit of dry volume and mass

An adowlie (also adholee, adholy, or adowly) is an obsolete unit of dry volume and mass formerly used in western India a standard measurement for grain and salt.

- As a dry measure for salt, it equalled approximately 2.509 litres (2.208 imp qt).
- As a measure of mass, it was roughly 1.982 kg (4.37 lb). A heavy adowlie was approximately 2.031 kg (4.48 lb)

After metrification in the mid-20th century, the unit became obsolete.

== See also ==
- List of customary units of measurement in South Asia
