= Puddee =

A puddee is an obsolete unit of dry volume used in Chennai (formerly Madras) in southern India. It was approximately equal to 2.89 imperial pints (1.591264 litres). Later it was standardised it to 100 cubic inches (1.64 litres), called the Government puddee.

After metrication in the mid-20th century, the unit became obsolete.

== See also ==
- List of customary units of measurement in South Asia
