= Passeree =

Unit of Measure

A passeree is an obsolete unit of mass used in Bengal that approximately equalled 4.677 kg (10.3 lb). Five seers made up one passeree. After metrication in the mid-20th century, the unit became obsolete.

== See also ==
- List of customary units of measurement in South Asia
