= Mulao =

Mulao or Mulam can refer to:

- Mulao people, an ethnic group of Guangxi, China
- Mulam language, the Tai–Kadai language spoken by them
- Mulao language (Kra), a dialect of the Gelao language, a Tai–Kadai language of China
- Mulam, an alternative name for hat'h, an obsolete unit of length in India
- Mulao, a village in Liloan, Cebu, the Philippines
