= Cullishigay =

Obsolete unit of dry volume

A cullishigay is an obsolete unit of dry volume used on the Malabar coast of southern India approximately equal to 1.25 imperial bushels (44 litres). It was a third of a mudi or moray, a larger unit of dry volume. After metrification in the mid-20th century, the unit became obsolete.

== See also ==
- List of customary units of measurement in South Asia
