= Stuck =

Stuck may refer to:

== Film and television ==
- Stuck (2001 film), a short film directed by Jamie Babbit
- Stuck (2002 film), a Canadian TV drama directed by Lindsay Bourne
- Stuck (2007 film), a thriller directed by Stuart Gordon and starring Stephen Rea and Mena Suvari
- Stuck!, a 2009 film by Steve Balderson
- Stuck (2014 film), a 2014 romantic comedy film directed by Stuart Acher
- Stuck (2017 film), a 2017 American film
- Stuck (TV series), a 2022 British sitcom starring Dylan Moran and Morgana Robinson
- "Stuck", an episode of Hart of Dixie

== Music ==
- Stuck (album), a 2014 album by hard rock band Adelitas Way
- Stuck, a 1994 EP by Puddle of Mudd
- "Stuck" (Caro Emerald song), 2010
- "Stuck" (Stacie Orrico song), 2003
- "Stuck" (Lost Kings song), 2018
- "Stuck" (Thirty Seconds to Mars song), 2023
- "Stuck", by Imagine Dragons from Origins
- "Stuck", by Norah Jones from The Fall
- "Stuck", by Twice from "What Is Love?"
- "Stuck", by Hatchie from Liquorice
- "Stuck", by Enhypen from The Sin: Bliss

== People ==
- Amanda Stuck (born 1982), American politician
- Franz Stuck (1863–1928), German painter and sculptor
- Hans Stuck (1900–1978), German-Austrian race driver
- Hans-Joachim Stuck (born 1951), German-Austrian race driver
- Hudson Stuck (1865–1920), American mountaineer
- Jean-Baptiste Stuck (1680–1755), French-Italian composer
- John Stuck (born 1943), English cricketer

== Other uses ==
- Stuck (unit), a unit of wine
- Stuck-at fault, a failure to progress

== See also ==
- STUC (disambiguation)
- Stuk (disambiguation)
