= Ground (unit) =

A ground is a unit of area used in India approximately equal to 203 square metres (2,190 sq ft). After metrication in the mid-20th century, the unit is being phased out. However, it is still popular in real estate parlance.

One ground is commonly taken as 2400 square feet and approximately one half ground is used as a small and standard lot to construct a small individual house in small towns in India. In olden times, houses used to adjoin and have common walls. In modern constructions, one sees this in the construction of condominiums, "flats", only. It is still in vogue in villages for economic reasons.

== See also ==
- List of customary units of measurement in South Asia
