= Stuk =

Stuk or STUK may refer to:

- Radiation and Nuclear Safety Authority, the Finnish nuclear regulatory agency
- StuK, abbreviation of Sturmkanone, a German designation for artillery guns
- "Stuk", a 2008 song by The Partysquad featuring Dio, Sef, Sjaak and Reverse
- "Stuk", ("a knock") a 1989 song by the Soviet band Kino from the album Zvezda po imeni Solntse.

== See also ==
- Stuck (disambiguation)
- STUC (disambiguation)
