= Candy (unit) =

South Asian traditional unit of mass

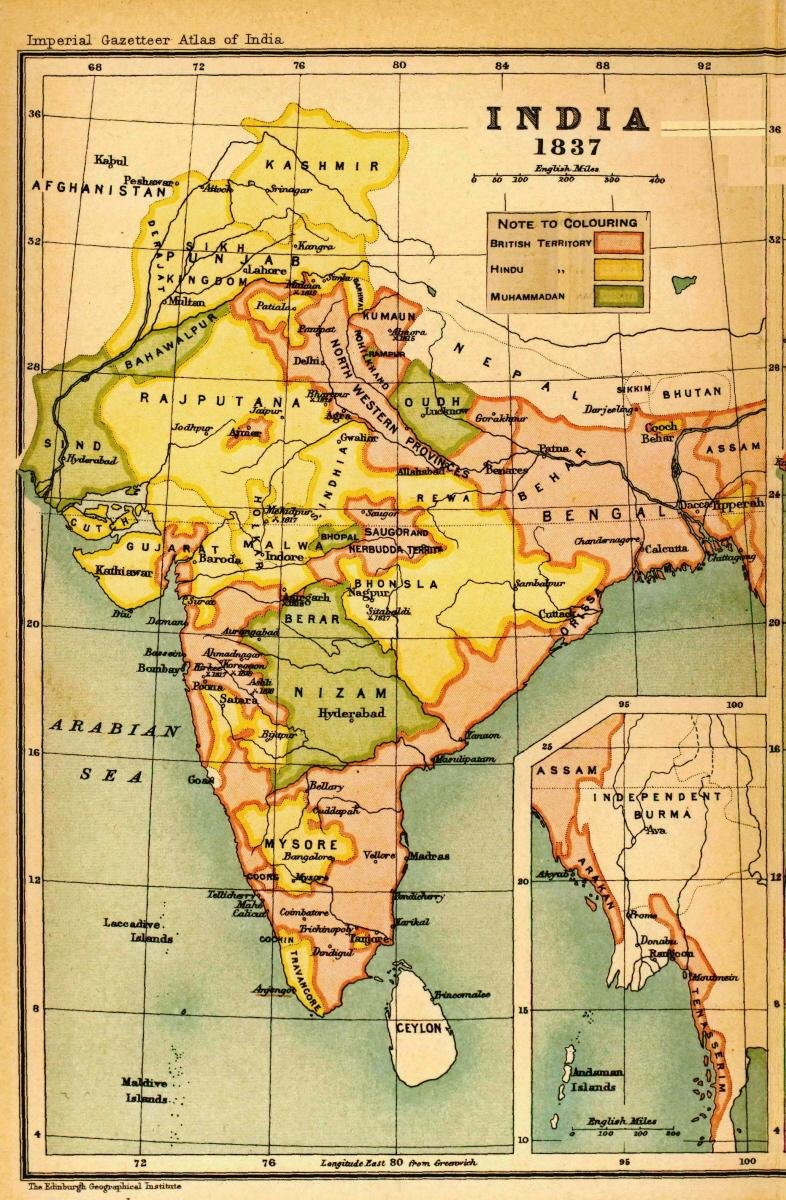
British India is shown in pink on this 1837 map. The Madras Presidency is in the southeast, the Bombay Presidency is in the west and the Bengal Presidency is in the northeast.

The candy or candee (Marathi: खंडी, khaṇḍī; Tamil: கண்டி, kaṇṭi; Malayalam: കണ്ഡി, kaṇḍi, കണ്ടി, kaṇṭi), also known as the maunee, was a traditional South Asian unit of mass, equal to 20 maunds and roughly equivalent to 500 pounds avoirdupois (227 kilograms). It was most used in southern India, to the south of Akbar's empire, but has been recorded elsewhere in South Asia. In Marathi, the same word was also used for a unit of area of 120 bighas (25 hectares, very approximately), and it is also recorded as a unit of dry volume.

The candy was generally one of the largest (if not the largest) unit in a given system of measurement. The name is thought to be derived from the Sanskrit खण्डन (root खुड्) khaṇḍ, "to divide, break into pieces", which has also been suggested as the root of the term (sugar-)candy. The word was adopted into several South Asian languages before the compilation of dictionaries, presumably through trade as several Dravidian languages have local synonyms: for example ఖండి kaṇḍi and పుట్టి puṭṭi in Telugu.

== Unit of mass ==
The candy was equal to twenty maunds, but the value of the maund was not standardised across South Asia. There were at least three different approximate values for maund in early nineteenth century India, ranging from 11.34 kg to 37.32 kg, and values from outside India varied even wider. Much of our knowledge of the values of South Asian mass units comes from an 1821 study ordered by the British East India Company and subsequently published as Kelly's Oriental Metrology, (Note: It seems unlikely that Kelly actually measured any standards for the candy, or even that such large physical standards even existed. However, it can be assumed that he accurately measured standards for the maund (or a similar mass unit). His results are quoted to a precision of 1 dram avoirdupois (1.771 845 195 3125 g).) although the approximate value of 500 pounds for the candy is attested as early as 1618. The earliest European reference to the candy (1563) puts its mass at 522 arráteis (239.6 kg, 528.2 lbs.).

The three Presidencies of British India had already undertaken a fair degree of standardisation of weights and measures by the time of Kelly's study. (Note: This process of standardisation was not complete until 1833 in the Bengal Presidency.) In the Madras Presidency, the maund was fixed at 25 lbs. av. (11.340 kg), (Note: The Anglo-Hindoostanee Handbook (1850) gives the Madras maund as 25 troy pounds (9.331 kg), in contradiction with the values quoted in Prinsep (1840) that are far more complete and closer in time to the original British East India Company study of local weight standards (1821). It would seem unusual to have used troy weight for such large commercial quantities, so Prinsep's value has been retained here.) making the candy equal to 500 lbs. av. (226.796 kg). In the Bombay Presidency, the maund was fixed at 28 lbs. av. (12.701 kg), making the candy exactly equal to 5 hundredweight (560 lbs. av., 254.012 kg). In Bombay itself (present-day Mumbai), a separate value of the candy was recorded for "grain", equal to 8 parahs or 358 lbs. 6 oz. 4 dr. (162.563 kg, see also below). In the Bengal Presidency, where the candy was not traditionally used, the maund (or mun) was a much larger unit, 100 troy pounds (Note: The use of an exact figure in troy weight for the Bengal Presidency stems from the definition of the local measurement system, based on the tola. The Bengal seer (1/80 of a Bengal maund) was exactly 72/35 pounds avoirdupois [Prinsep (1840), p. 65], so the Bengal maund was exactly 1152/7 lbs. av.) (37.324 kg, equivalent to a candy of 746.5 kg).

The effects of this standardisation can also be seen in other territories under direct British control. In Ceylon, the candy (also known as the bahar) was 500 lbs (226.796 kg) as on the Continent. Use of the candy is also recorded in British Burma, where it was the equivalent of 150 viss: its equivalent in Imperial units was measured as 500 lbs. (226.796 kg) in Pegu and 550 lbs. (249.476 kg) in Rangoon.

Perhaps the most striking example is from the princely state of Travancore in southwest India. At the British East India Company trading station of Anjengo, (near modern-day Kadakkavoor), the candy was equal to 35 telong and fixed at 560 lbs. (254.012 kg), as in Bombay. At Colachy (modern-day Kolachal) however, less than 50 miles (80 km) to the south, the candy was measured at only 376 lbs. 1 oz. 2 dr. (170.583 kg).

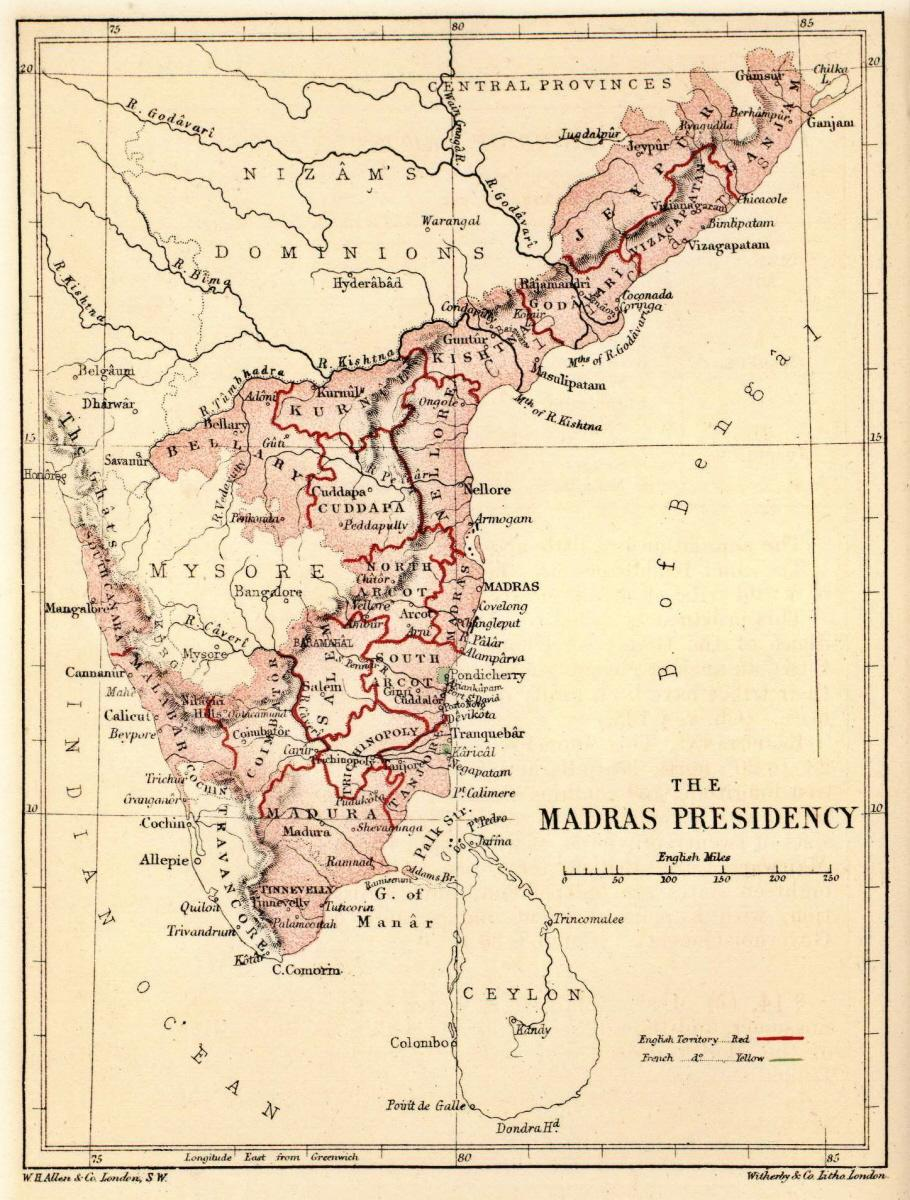
Madras Presidency shown in an 1880 map.

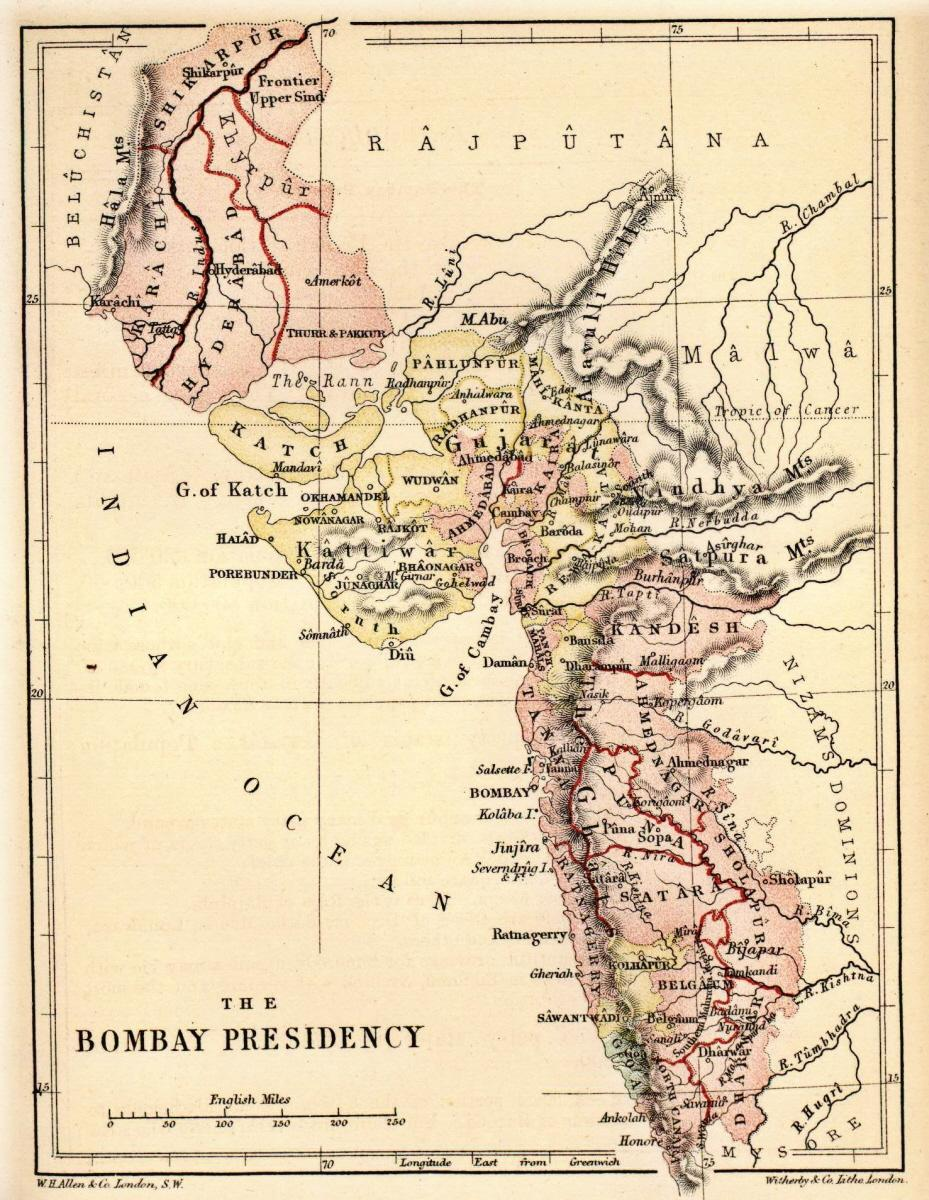
Bombay Presidency in an 1880 map.

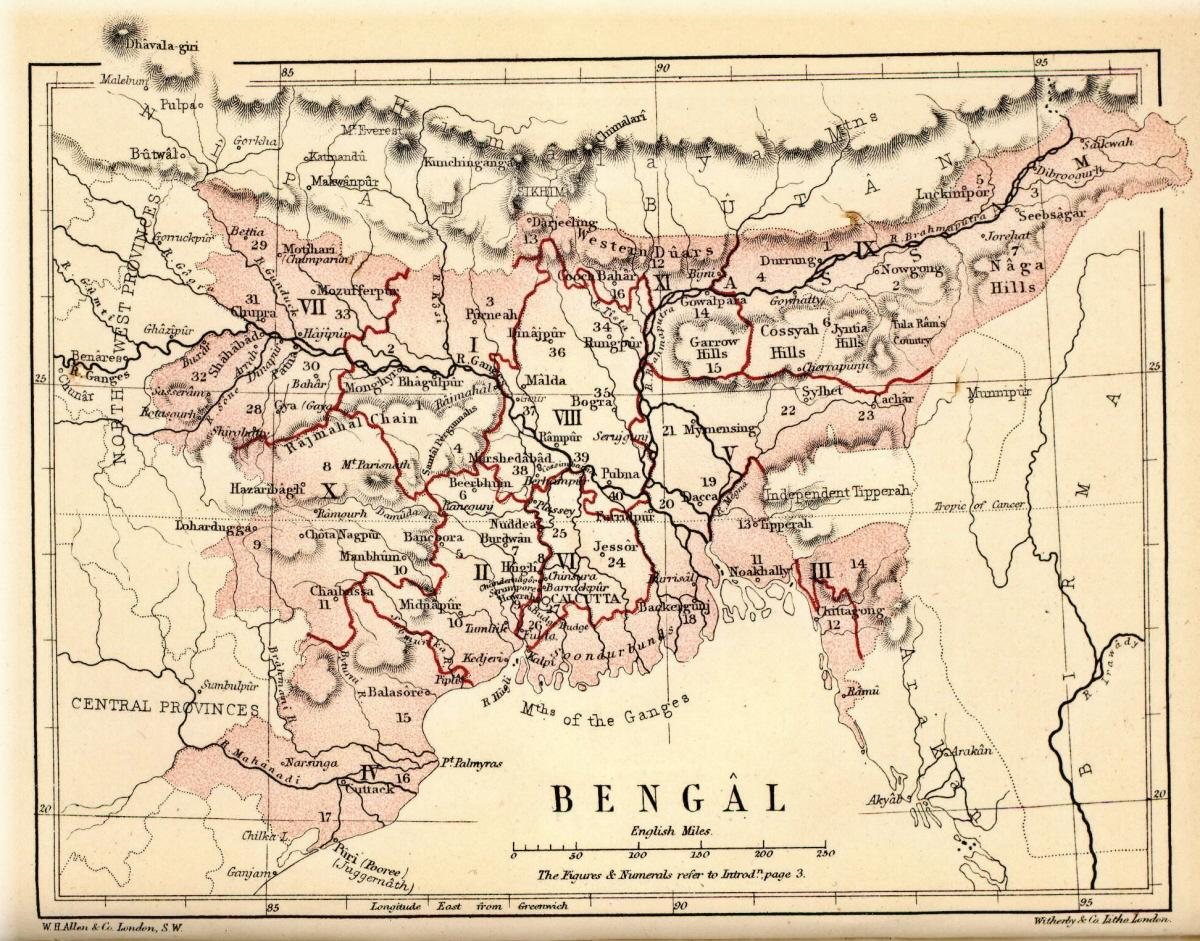
Bengal Presidency in 1880.

In the region of the Central Provinces, the maund was roughly 40 lbs., which is probably about the value it had under the Mughal Empire. (Note: Depending on the method of calculation, the Mughal mun can be estimated as either 34 3/4 lbs. av. or 47 lbs. av. [Prinsep (1840), p. 81].) The candy was not recorded as being in use as a unit of measurement in this region in 1821. Although not a part of the Central Provinces region, the unusually high value recorded for the candy in Baroda, Gujarat (modern-day Vadodara) – 892 lbs. 1 oz. 4 dr. (404.640 kg) – can be explained by this higher value of the Mughal maund. The candy in Surat, the main port of Gujarat, is also consistently quoted as being much larger than the same unit further south.

== Unit of area ==
The candy (खंडी, khaṇḍī) is also recorded as a unit of area in Marathi, equal to 120 bighas. It is impossible to accurately convert this to modern units given the huge variability in the different values of the bigha in different locations. In particular, Kelly's 1821 study of South Asian metrology is completely silent on land measures in the Bombay Presidency. Molesworth defines the Marathi bigha (बिघा, bighā) as equal to twenty pandas (पांड, pāṇḍa) or to 400 square kathys (काठी, kāṭhī), but also notes that it varies in different districts. The same author defines the kathy as "a land measure,—five cubits and five handbreadths […] also the measuring rod": other authors are silent on the unit. (Note: There is a Nepali unit of area called the kattha (कठ्ठा), approximately 338.57 m^{2}: this is implausibly large for the Marathi kathy, and there is no reason to assume that the two units are the same.) A cubit is roughly equal to five handbreadths, so the kathy can be taken to be roughly 25 square cubits: that is, 8100 square inches or 6.25 square yards. This would make the bigha roughly 2500 square yards, or half an acre, in agreement with measurements in other areas of India. The candy, therefore, can be taken to be approximately 60 acres or 25 hectares.

The celebrated Scottish orientalist Sir Henry Yule gives a slightly larger value for the candy as a unit of area ("approximately 75 acres"), and describes it as the area of land which will produce one candy of grain. The Telugu unit of the putty (పుట్టి, puṭṭi) is also used in the same way: one putty of land is that area which will produce one putty of rice.

== Unit of dry volume ==
Several sources also describe the candy as a unit of dry measure. Again, it is difficult to give an accurate conversion to modern units, as most sources quote conversions to mass units for specific goods, (Note: Prinsep (1840) goes as far as to assert that India had no true measures of dry volume, despite his description of the methods for determining the mass equivalent of dry measures (pp. 79–80).) and the few specific conversion factors that exist range from 8 to 25 bushels. More plausible is that one candy of dry measure was the volume that would have been occupied by one candy (in mass) of water, that is about 254 litres (7 bushels) in Bombay (present-day Mumbai).

- One candy of "grain" (unspecified) in Bombay was recorded by Kelly as 8 parahs or 358 lbs. 6 oz. 4 dr. (162.563 kg), compared to a standard Bombay candy of 560 lbs. (254.012 kg), a factor of 0.640. This factor is lower than the relative density of modern hulled rice (0.753) but higher than that of rough rice (0.577).
- One parah for salt measure for Bombay was reported as 1607.6 cubic inches (26.344 litres), implying a candy for dry measure of salt as 210.8 litres: the factor (1.20, based on 254 litres for one candy of water) is identical to the relative density of caked salt.
- The Ceylonese standard parah was a cube of sides 11.57 inches, that is 25.41 litres.
- Molesworth defines the Marathi palah (पल्ला, pallā) as 120 seers, implying a candy of 960 seers and a maund of 48 seers. The Bombay seer is given by Kelly as 11 oz. 3 dr. (317.2 g) for both grain and other commercial goods.

Not all grain measures in candies should be taken as dry measures. The United Nations Statistical Office reported that the candy was in use in the 20th century:

- in east India for measuring rice, with a value of approximately 210.636 kg compared to the old Madras standard candy of 226.796 kg;
- in Ceylon (later Sri Lanka) for measuring copra, with a value of 560 lbs.

Both of these are obviously related to the candy as a unit of mass.
