= Lachter =

Obsolete unit of length

- Unit system: old weights and measures
- Symbol: Lr. or °

Conversions
1 Lr. or ° in ...	... is equal to ...
- SI derived units: 2±0.1 m

The lachter (also Berglachter) was a common unit of length used in the mining industry in Europe, usually to measure depth, tunnel driving and the size of mining fields; it was also used for contract work. In most German-speaking mining fields it was the most important unit of length.

A lachter was roughly equal to the amount which a man could contain within his outstretched arms. It was thus similar to the klafter (ca. 1.8 m or 5.91 ft), but was usually rather larger.

The lachter was - with regional differences - subdivided into Achtel (also called a Spann, Gräpel or Gröbel), (Lachter)Zoll, Primen (or Prinen) and Sekunden:

- 1 lachter = 8 Spann = 80 (Lachter)Zoll = 800 Primen = 8,000 Sekunden

In the 19th century a decimal system of subdivision was established:

- 1 lachter = 10 Lachterfuß = 100 Lachterzoll = 1,000 Lachterlinien

Like other units of measure, the lachter varied in length depending on the region, but there could also be differences in length within the same region. In addition there could also be differences between various mining fields within a territory. The specification and use of conversion tables only makes sense if it is known for certain, where and at which times the values were valid. Some examples:

Some kinds of Lachter
Region	Length of 1 Lachter in m (ft)	Remarks
Altenberg (Ore Mountains)	1.9851 m (6.513 ft)	
Anhalt-Köthen	2.0410 m (6.696 ft)	Harzgerode Lachter
Annaberg	1.9826 m (6.505 ft)	
Baden (to 1827)	2.25 m (7.38 ft)	= 7.5 old Baden feet (Fuß)
Baden (from 1827)	2.99 m (9.81 ft)	= 10 new Baden feet
Bavaria	1.9705 m (6.46 ft)	
Bayreuth	2.0354 m (6.678 ft)	equal to 80 Bayreuth inches (Zoll)
Berchtesgaden	1.7512 m (5.745 ft)	equalt to 6 feet
Bohemia	2.3805 m (7.810 ft)	equal to 4 ells (Ellen)
Brunswick	1.9198 m (6.299 ft)	
Clausthal	1.9238 m (6.312 ft)	
Eisleben	2.0111 m (6.598 ft)	
Freiberg	1.9426 m (6.373 ft)	Old Freiberg Lachter
Hanover	1.9198 m (6.299 ft)	
Idrija (Carniola)	1.957 m (6.42 ft)	6 Idrian feet
Joachimsthal (today: Jáchymov)	1.918 m (6.29 ft)	
Johanngeorgenstadt	1.9811 m (6.500 ft)	
Kronach	2.1270 m (6.978 ft)	equal to 7 Nuremberg feet
Lippe-Detmold	2.3161 m (7.599 ft)	
Marienberg	1.9849 m (6.512 ft)	
Nassau	2.0924 m (6.865 ft)	
Austria	1.8965 m (6.222 ft)	1 Berglachter = 6 shoes (Schuh)
Prussia	2.092 m (6.86 ft)	80 Prussian inches (Zoll)
Saxony	1.98233 m (6.5037 ft); 2.00000 m (6.56168 ft)	until 1830: 7 Dresden or Saxon feet from 1830: defined to be exactly 2 metres (6.56 ft).
Schemnitz (today: Banská Štiavnica)	2.022 m (6.63 ft)	
Silesia	1.9202 m (6.300 ft)	
Tyrol (1769-1809 and after 1815)	1.8949 m (6.217 ft)	= Viennese Klafter
Tyrol: Innsbruck (before 1769)	2.005 m (6.58 ft)	= 6 Tyrolean feet = 72 Tyrolean inches
Tyrol: Kitzbühl (1747)	1.78 m (5.84 ft)	= 64 Tyrolean inches
Tyrol: Schwaz	1.75 m (5.74 ft)	= 63 Tyrolean inches
Württemberg	2.0054 m (6.579 ft)	= 7 Württemberg feet

A Lachterschnur was an oiled, 10–12 Lachter long cord, used as a measuring device.

== See also ==
- List of human-based units of measure
- List of obsolete units of measurement
- Obsolete Austrian units of measurement
- Obsolete German units of measurement

== Sources ==
- Helmut Kahnt; Bernd Knorr (1986), Alte Maße, Münzen und Gewichte (in German), Leipzig: VEB Bibliographisches Institut, ISBN 3-323-00013-7
- Bernd Leißring (1989), "Maßeinheiten des alten Bergbaus. Das Lachter", Erzgebirgische Heimatblätter (in German), no. 5, Olbernhau: Kulturbund, pp. 132–136, ISSN 0232-6078
