= Abucco =

Obsolete unit of measurement

In Bago Region, Myanmar, the abucco (plural abucci or abuccos) is a unit of mass once used to measure the mass of gold and silver. It is approximately equivalent to 196.44 grams or 6.316 troy ounces.

Other units of mass used in Myanmar were:

- 1 biza = 4 agiros = 8 abucci = 100 teccalis
- 1 agiro = 2 abucci = 25 teccalis
- 1 abacco = 12 1/2 teccalis

== See also ==
- List of obsolete units of measurement
