= Kula (unit) =

Indian-Moroccan obsolete unit of measurement

A kula is an obsolete unit of measurement.

- In India, it was a unit of land area. After metrication in the mid-20th century, the unit became obsolete.
- In Morocco, it was a unit of mass equal to 22 rotal, or 11.165 kg (24.61458 lb)

== See also ==
- List of customary units of measurement in South Asia
