= Garce =

A garce is an obsolete unit of measurement.

In India, a garce was a unit of dry volume approximately equal to 5,244 litres (149 US bushels). In Sri Lanka, it was approximately 5,084.8 litres (144.29447 US bushels).

A garce was also a unit of mass in Sri Lanka approximately equal to 4,198.518 kg (9,256.130 lb). After metrication by both countries in the mid-20th century, the unit became obsolete.

== See also ==
- List of customary units of measurement in South Asia
