= Cawnie =

Obsolete unit of land area used in India

A cawnie (also "kani") is an obsolete unit of land area formerly used in Chennai, India. It was approximately equal to 1.322 acres (5,349 m^{2}). After metrication in the mid-20th century, the unit became obsolete.

== See also ==
- List of customary units of measurement in South Asia
