= Tank (unit) =

A tank is an obsolete unit of mass in India approximately equal to 4.4 g (69 gr). After metrication in the mid-20th century, the unit became obsolete.

== See also ==
- List of customary units of measurement in South Asia
