= Chungah =

Obsolete unit of volume used in India

A chungah is an obsolete unit of volume used in India, approximately equal to 1/6 of an imperial gallon (0.758 litres). After metrication in the mid-20th century the unit became obsolete.

== See also ==
- List of customary units of measurement in South Asia
