= STUC =

STUC may refer to:

- Scottish Trades Union Congress
- Samoa Trade Union Congress
- Star Trek VI: The Undiscovered Country (ST:UC) a science-fiction film

== See also ==
- Stuck (disambiguation)
- STUK (disambiguation)
