= Munjandie =

A munjandie is an obsolete unit of mass in India approximately equal to 4 grains (0.259 g). After metrication in the mid-20th century, the unit became obsolete.

== See also ==
- List of customary units of measurement in South Asia
