= Corgee =

Obsolete unit of mass

A corgee is an obsolete unit of mass equal to 212 moodahs, or rush mat bundles of rice. The unit was used in the Canara (now Kanara) region of Karnataka in India.

== See also ==
- List of customary units of measurement in South Asia
- List of obsolete units of measurement
