= Cullingey =

Obsolete unit of mass

A cullingey is an obsolete unit of mass that was used in the southern region in the state of Karnataka in India. One cullingey was approximately equal to 81.25 troy grains (5.265 g). After metrification in the mid-20th century, the unit became obsolete.

== See also ==
- List of customary units of measurement in South Asia
