= Cana (unit) =

Unit of length

A cana was a unit of length used in the former Crown of Aragon. The exact meaning was not consistent, but the use in Barcelona was a distance of 1.57 metres (5.2 ft). It is around the same value as the vara, a rarely used Spanish and Portuguese unit of length.

== See also ==
- List of obsolete units of measurement
- Portuguese units of measurement
