= Deal (unit) =

Archaic unit of volume used to measure wood

Deal is an obsolete unit of measurement formerly used in the UK and US to measure what is today described as "Dimension Lumber". From the late 18th to the early 20th centuries, the term "deal board" referred to rough sawn Spruce or Pine planks two to three inches thick (sometimes thicker), up to 12" wide and 12 to 14 feet long. These were often re-sawn into smaller dimensions by the end-user for use in Wood Framing, Cooperage and Furniture making. They were traded as a maritime commodity. The term "Deal" is also used to refer to wood from Fir or Pine trees

== Definition ==
Deal (UK) is equal to 7 in × 72 in × 2 1/2 in (178 mm × 1,829 mm × 64 mm).

Deal (US) is equal to 144 in × 11 in × 1 1/2 in (3,658 mm × 279 mm × 38 mm).

Whole deal is equal to 144 in × 11 in × 5/8 in (3,658 mm × 279 mm × 16 mm).

Split deal is equal to 144 in × 8 in × 16 in (3,660 mm × 200 mm × 410 mm).

Note: Cardarelli seems to be inaccurate. A whole deal should be 1 1/4 in (32 mm) thick, a split or slit deal should be 5/8 in (16 mm) thick, and a deal not specified as either whole, slit, or split should be twice as thick as the whole deal.

== Conversion ==
1 Deal (UK) ≡ 105/144 (= 0.72916667) cubic feet ≡ 8.75 (or 35/4) board feet ≡ 0.02064770064 m^{3}

1 Deal (US) ≡ 1.375 cubic feet ≡ 16.5 (or 33/2) board feet ≡ 0.0389356640640 m^{3}

1 Whole deal ≡ 55/96 (= 0.572916667) cubic foot ≡ 6.875 (or 55/8) board feet ≡ 0.01622319336 m^{3}

1 Split deal ≡ 128 cubic feet ≡ 1536 board feet ≡ 3.624556363776 m^{3}

== See also ==
- List of obsolete units of measurement
