= Dharni (unit) =

The dharni (Nepali: धार्नि, romanized: dhārni) is a still used ancient unit of mass, used in Nepal, of about 2 1/2 seer. It was divided into 2 bisauli (बिसौलि), 4 boṛi (बोड़ि), or 12 pāu (पाउ). The United Nations Statistical Office gave an approximate equivalence of 2.3325 kilograms (5.142 pounds avoirdupois) in 1966.
