= Indian Institute of Legal Metrology =

- Type: Statutory Body
- Headquarters: Ranchi, India
- Region served: India, South and South East Asia
- Director: Dr. Rajeshwar Kumar
- Parent organization: Ministry of Consumer Affairs, Food and Public Distribution, Department of Consumer Affairs
- Website: iilm.gov.in

The Indian Institute of Legal Metrology (IILM) is a statutory body established by the Government of India under the provisions of the Standards of Weights and Measures Act, 1976, and is deemed to have been established under section 21 of the Legal Metrology Act, 2009. It is located in Ranchi, India, and operates under the direct control of the Ministry of Consumer Affairs, Food and Public Distribution, Department of Consumer Affairs (Government of India).

== History ==
The establishment of a training center for weights and measures in India was considered essential even before the introduction of the Metric system. Several states, particularly Maharashtra and Bihar, took the initiative to train their enforcement officials to maintain uniformity in standards and safeguard consumer interests.

In 1962, the Government of Bihar established the "All India Training Institute of Weights and Measures" in Patna as a centrally sponsored scheme. This institute was taken over by the Government of India in 1970, including all its assets and liabilities, to ensure proper development.

Initially, the institute operated under German government collaboration. Based on recommendations from German experts, the institute was relocated to Ranchi in 1974 and renamed the "Indian Institute of Legal Metrology" (IILM). The IILM has since evolved into a premier institution, providing specialized training in legal metrology to officials from India and other countries.

The IILM is a statutory body established by the Government of India under the provisions of the Standards of Weights and Measures Act, 1976, and is deemed to have been established under section 21 of the Legal Metrology Act, 2009. It operates under the direct control of the Ministry of Consumer Affairs, Food and Public Distribution, Department of Consumer Affairs. The institute conducts 32 courses at its premises, including three specialized Basic Training Courses (BTC) for Legal Metrology Officers (LMO) of India, each with a duration of four months.

== Functions ==
The primary function of the IILM is to impart training in the field of Legal Metrology and its allied branches. The institute conducts 32 courses at its premises, including three specialized Basic Training Courses (BTC) for Legal Metrology Officers (LMO) of India, each with a duration of four months. The institute also provides training to foreign officials from 32 countries.

== International Affiliations ==
India is a State Member of the International Organization of Legal Metrology (OIML), and the IILM ensures that India follows the international traceability of standards. The institute implements OIML recommendations as per the country's requirements and maintains traceability up to the level of reference standards.
