= Square metre =

SI-derived unit of area

square metre
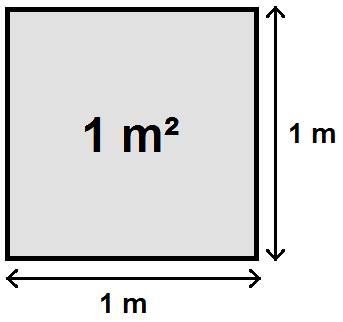
- Visualisation of a square metre

General information
- Unit system: SI
- Unit of: area
- Symbol: m^{2}

Comparison of 1 square metre with some Imperial and metric units of area

The square metre (international spelling as used by the International Bureau of Weights and Measures) or square meter (American spelling) is the unit of area in the International System of Units (SI) with symbol m^{2}. It is the area of a square with sides one metre in length.

Adding and subtracting SI prefixes creates multiples and submultiples; however, as the unit is exponentiated, the quantities grow exponentially by the corresponding power of 10. For example, 1 kilometre is 10^{3} (one thousand) times the length of 1 metre, but 1 square kilometre is (10^{3})^{2} (10^{6}, one million) times the area of 1 square metre, and 1 cubic kilometre is (10^{3})^{3} (10^{9}, one billion) cubic metres.

Its inverse is the reciprocal square metre (m^{−2}), often called "per square metre".

== SI prefixes applied ==
Square Meter Unit Conversion Visual Aid

The square metre may be used with all SI prefixes used with the metre.

Multiplication	Name	Symbol	Multiplication	Name	Symbol
10^{0}	square metre (centiare)	m^{2}	10^{0}	square metre (centiare)	m^{2}
10^{2}	square decametre (are)	dam^{2}	10^{−2}	square decimetre	dm^{2}
10^{3}	kilo square metre	k(m^{2})	10^{−3}	milli square metre	m(m^{2})
10^{4}	square hectometre (hectare)	hm^{2}	10^{−4}	square centimetre	cm^{2}
10^{6}	square kilometre	km^{2}	10^{−6}	square millimetre	mm^{2}
10^{12}	square megametre	Mm^{2}	10^{−12}	square micrometre	μm^{2}
10^{18}	square gigametre	Gm^{2}	10^{−18}	square nanometre	nm^{2}
10^{24}	square terametre	Tm^{2}	10^{−24}	square picometre	pm^{2}
10^{30}	square petametre	Pm^{2}	10^{−30}	square femtometre	fm^{2}
10^{36}	square exametre	Em^{2}	10^{−36}	square attometre	am^{2}
10^{42}	square zettametre	Zm^{2}	10^{−42}	square zeptometre	zm^{2}
10^{48}	square yottametre	Ym^{2}	10^{−48}	square yoctometre	ym^{2}
10^{54}	square ronnametre	Rm^{2}	10^{−54}	square rontometre	rm^{2}
10^{60}	square quettametre	Qm^{2}	10^{−60}	square quectometre	qm^{2}

== Unicode characters ==
Unicode has several characters used to represent metric area units, but these are for compatibility with East Asian character encodings and are not meant to be used in new documents.

- U+33A1 ㎡ SQUARE M SQUARED
- U+33A2 ㎢ SQUARE KM SQUARED
- U+3378 ㍸ SQUARE DM SQUARED
- U+33A0 ㎠ SQUARE CM SQUARED
- U+339F ㎟ SQUARE MM SQUARED

Instead, the Unicode superscript U+00B2 ² SUPERSCRIPT TWO can be used, as in m².

== Conversions ==
One square metre is equal to:

- 0.000001 square kilometre (km^{2})
- 10000 square centimetres (cm^{2})
- 0.0001 hectares (ha)
- 0.001 decares (daa)
- 0.01 ares (a)
- 0.1 deciares (da)
- 1 centiare (ca)
- 0.000247105381 acres (ac)
- 0.0247105381 cents
- 1.195990 square yards (sq yd)
- 10.763911 square feet (ft^{2})
- 1550.0031 square inches (in^{2})

== See also ==
- Conversion of units § Area
- Orders of magnitude (area)
- SI
- SI prefix
