= Demiard =

Pre-revolutionary French unit of volume

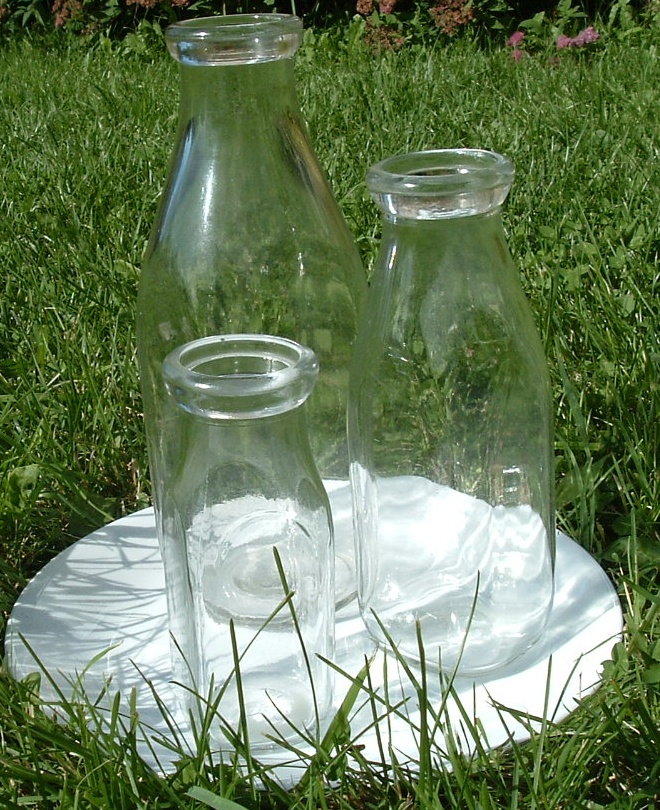
Glass milk bottles from 1950s Quebec. The large bottle is a pinte (quart), the middle size a chopine (pint) and the small size a demiard (half-pint). The latter was used for cream.

The demiard is a traditional unit of volume originating in pre-revolutionary France. After the revolution, when the metric system was introduced in France, the demiard persisted in Louisiana, Quebec, and other French-speaking areas of North America.

It has been asserted that it was originally half of an ard, an otherwise unknown unit. The demiard was defined as half of a chopine or a quarter of a pinte. Since the pinte was defined as 48 cubic Paris inches (pouces du Roi), this made the demiard 12 cubic inches (and the chopine 24 cubic inches). In metric units, the demiard, chopine, and pinte were 238 mL, 476 mL, and 952 mL respectively, when defined against the cubic Paris inch.

In North America, the three unit names became associated with American and British units of similar sizes, where the demiard was a half-pint, the chopine was a pint, and the pinte was a quart. In modern Canadian usage, the demiard is equal to 284 millilitres, or half a British Imperial pint. If defined as half of a US customary pint, it instead equals 237 milliliters.

== See also ==
- Comparison of the imperial and US customary measurement systems
- Cup (unit)
- Imperial and US customary measurement systems
- List of obsolete units of measurement
- Units of measurement in France before the French Revolution
