= Lessa (unit) =

A lessa was a customary unit of area used in the Indian state of Manipur and neighbouring regions. After metrication in the mid-20th century, the unit became obsolete.

== Size ==
The conversion of the lessa is still debated to this day.

== See also ==
- Pari
- Sana lamjel
- Bigha
- Katha (unit)
