= Pari (unit) =

A pari was customary unit of area equal to 50×60 sana lamjel in Manipur, India, approximately 1 hectare. A sana lamjel was defined by the ruler of the kingdom, Nongda Lairen Pakhangpa in 33 CE, being equal to the distance from the floor to the tips of the fingers of his raised right hand while standing (a fathom), plus 4 fingerwidths.

1 pari was equal to 2 lourak, 4 sangam, 8 loukhai, 16 loushal, or 32 tong.

== See also ==
- List of customary units of measurement in South Asia
