= Bamboo (unit) =

Unit of measurement

A bamboo is an obsolete unit of length in India and Myanmar.

== India ==
In India, the unit was fixed by the reforms of Akbar (1556–1605) at approximately 12.8 m (42 ft). After metrication in India in the mid-20th century, the unit became obsolete.

== Myanmar ==
In Myanmar (formerly Burma) it was approximately 3.91 metres (12.8 ft). It was also known as the dha.

- One thousand bamboos = one dain (A dain is sometimes referred to as a "Burmese league")
- One dain = 7 saundaungs

== See also ==
- List of customary units of measurement in South Asia
