= Ser (unit) =

Obsolete Indian unit of dry volume

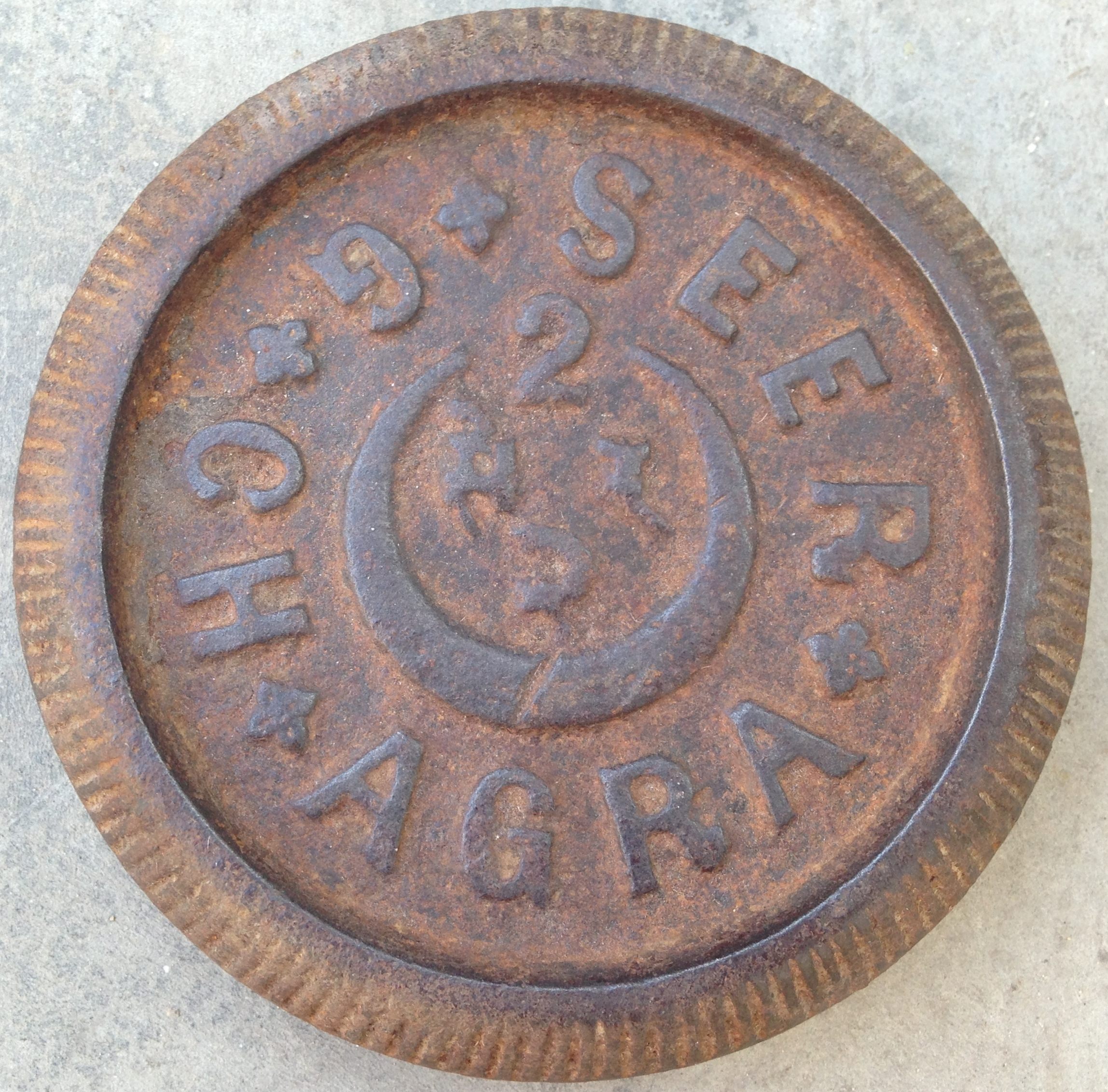
A Two Ser Stone

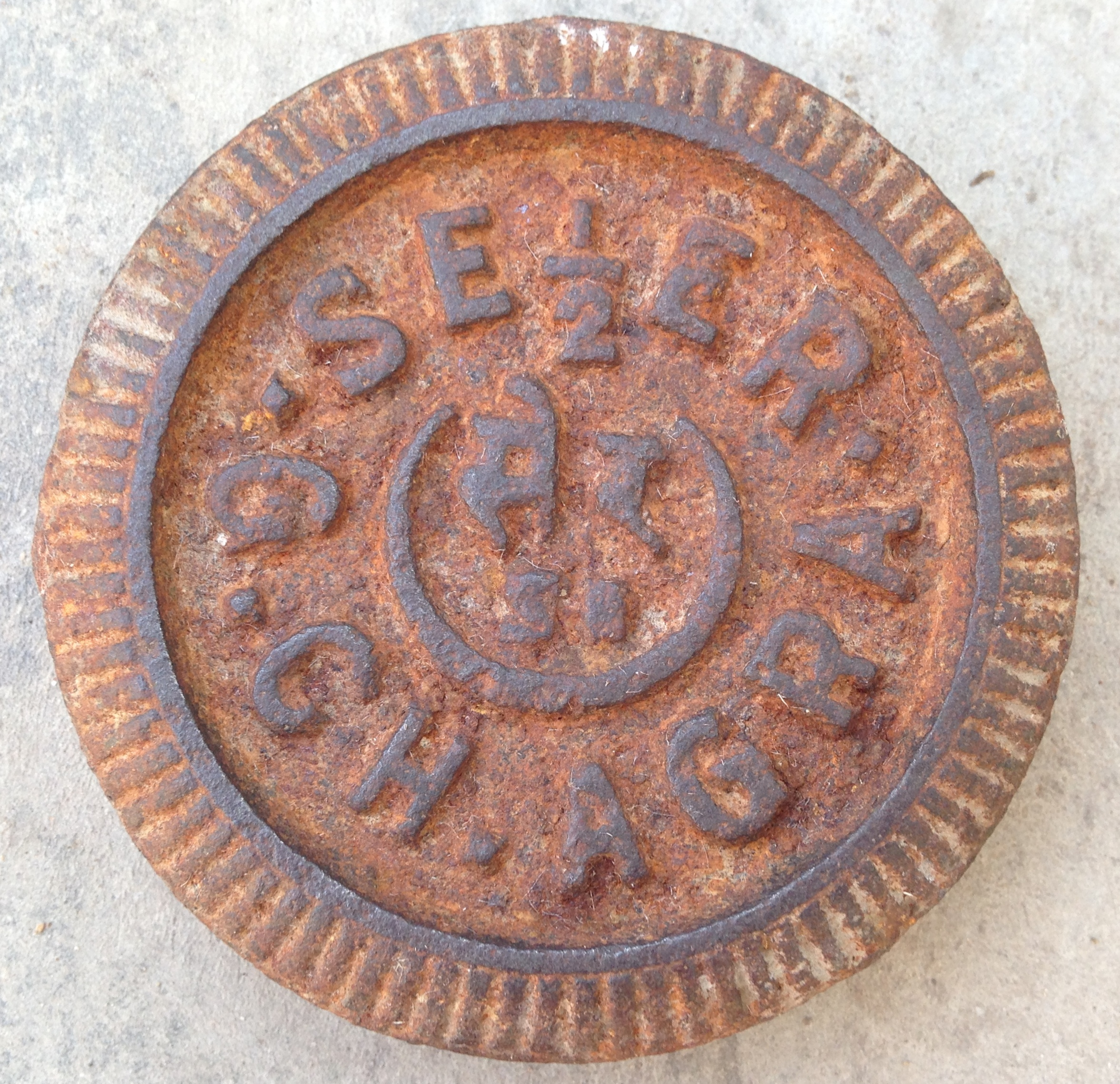
A Half Ser Stone

A ser is an obsolete unit of dry volume in India. In 1871 it was defined as being exactly 1 litre. After metrication in the mid-20th century, the unit became obsolete. It was the unit in pre-modern India which was so close to the metric values of volume approx equal to a litre.

== See also ==
- List of customary units of measurement in South Asia
