= Cent (area) =

Unit of measurement

cent
- If the larger box is an acre, the smaller box is a cent

General information
- Unit of: Area
- Symbol: cent
- Derivation: 1 cent = 0.01 acre

Conversions
1 cent in ...	... is equal to ...
- SI units: 40.46856 m^{2}
- Imperial units: 48.40000 sq yd

The cent is a customary unit of measurement still used in some parts of southern Indian states such as Andhra Pradesh, Telangana, Kerala, Tamil Nadu and Karnataka despite the usual use of metric units for other instances. One cent is defined as an area of 1/100 of an acre (40.5 m^{2}; 435.6 sq ft). It is still used in many news reports and real estate deals.

== Conversion chart ==
1 cent in common area units
Unit	Value
Square feet	435.6000
Acres	0.01000000
Hectares	0.004046856
Square metres	40.46856
Square inches	62,726.40
Square yards	48.40000
Square centimetres	404,685.6

== See also ==
- List of customary units of measurement in South Asia
- Ankanam
