= Girah =

Unit of length in India and Pakistan

A girah (also geerah) was a unit of length in India and Pakistan approximately equal to 2.25 inches (5.715 cm). After metrication by both countries in the mid-20th century, the unit became obsolete.

== See also ==
- List of customary units of measurement in South Asia
