= Bertius =

Scientific classification
- Domain: Eukaryota
- Kingdom: Animalia
- Phylum: Arthropoda
- Class: Insecta
- Order: Orthoptera
- Suborder: Ensifera
- Family: Tettigoniidae
- Subfamily: Phaneropterinae
- Genus: Bertius; Piza, 1974
- Species: B. margaritatus

Binomial name
- Bertius margaritatus Piza, 1974

Synonyms
- Bentius Otte, 1997

Genus of cricket-like animals

Bertius is a monotypic genus of bush crickets in the subfamily Phaneropterinae. The single species Bertius margaritatus Piza, 1974 was recorded from Turrialba, Costa Rica.

== See also ==
Petrus Bertius
