= Octave (unit) =

Octave is a British unit of volume used for measuring whisky. It is approximately 16 gallons.

== Conversion ==
1 octave = 16 gallons

1 octave = 0.073 m^{3}
