= Ship load =

Imperial unit of mass for coal

Ship load is a United Kingdom unit of weight for coal equal to 20 keels or 949,760 pounds (430,800 kg).
