= Standards of Weights and Measures Act, 1976 =

Act of the Parliament of India

Parliament of India
- Long title: An Act to establish standards of weights and measures, to regulate trade or commerce in weights, measures and other goods which are sold or distributed by weight, measure or number, and to provide for matters connected therewith or incidental thereto.
- Citation: Act No. 60 of 1976
- Enacted by: Parliament of India
- Enacted: 8 April 1976
- Commenced: 20 September 1977
- Status: Repealed

The Standards of Weights and Measures Act, 1976 was an Act of the Parliament of India enacted to establish standards of weights and measures, and to regulate trade or commerce in weights, measures, and other goods sold or distributed by weight, measure, or number. The Act aimed to ensure uniformity and accuracy in weights and measures across India.

== Background ==
The Act was introduced to replace the Standards of Weights and Measures Act, 1956, which was based on the metric system and international units recognized by the International Organization of Legal Metrology (OIML). The 1976 Act was enacted to keep pace with rapid advances in science and technology worldwide and to adopt the International System of Units (SI units) as recommended by the General Conference of Weights and Measures (CGPM).

== Key Provisions ==
=== Establishment of Standards ===
The Act established weights and measures based on SI units, as adopted by the CGPM and recognized by the OIML. It provided specifications for measuring instruments used in commercial transactions, industrial production, and measurements involved in public health and human safety.

=== Regulation of Trade and Commerce ===
The Act regulated inter-state trade and commerce in weights and measures, as well as commodities sold, distributed, or supplied by weight or measure. It also regulated pre-packed commodities sold or intended to be sold in the course of inter-state commerce.

=== Approval of Models ===
The Act required approval of models of weights and measuring instruments before manufacture.

=== Control of Export and Import ===
It provided for the control and regulation of export and import of weights and measures and commodities in packaged form.

=== Establishment of Indian Institute of Legal Metrology ===
The Act established the Indian Institute of Legal Metrology to provide training in legal metrology to inspectors and others.

=== Enforcement Powers ===
The Act granted powers to inspectors for inspection, search, seizure, and forfeiture of non-standard weights or measures. It also provided for the prosecution of offenses and the power to compound certain cases.

== Repeal and Replacement ==
The Standards of Weights and Measures Act, 1976, along with the Standards of Weights and Measures (Enforcement) Act, 1985, was repealed and replaced by the Legal Metrology Act, 2009, which came into effect on 1 April 2011. The new Act aimed to further modernize and streamline the regulation of weights and measures in India.

The Legal Metrology Act, 2009 retained many provisions of the 1976 Act while introducing new features to address contemporary challenges in weights and measures regulation. It continued to emphasize the establishment and enforcement of standards, regulation of trade and commerce, and protection of consumer interests.
