= Pau (unit) =

A pau was a customary unit of capacity used in Brunei, Malaysia, Sabah, and Sarawak. A pau was 2 imperial gills (approximately 0.284 liters or 0.600 US pints).

== See also ==
- List of customary units of measurement in South Asia
- Malay units of measurement
