= Buddam (unit) =

A buddam was a unit of mass used in the pearl trade in Mumbai (then known as Bombay) during the 19th century. One buddam was equivalent to 1/1600 of a chow, or 1/16 of a docra.

== See also ==
- List of customary units of measurement in South Asia
