= Legal Metrology Act, 2009 =

Indian legislation establishing standards for weights and measures

Parliament of India
- Enacted by: Parliament of India

Repeals
- Standards of Weights and Measures Act, 1976 Standards of Weights and Measures (Enforcement) Act, 1985
- Status: In force

The Legal Metrology Act, 2009 is an Act of the Parliament of India that establishes and enforces standards of weights and measures in India. It was enacted to replace the Standards of Weights and Measures Act, 1976 and the Standards of Weights and Measures (Enforcement) Act, 1985.

== Background ==
The Legal Metrology Act, 2009 was introduced to consolidate and amend the laws relating to weights and measures in India. It aims to establish and enforce standards of weights and measures and regulate trade and commerce in weights, measures, and other goods sold or distributed by weight, measure, or number.

== Key provisions ==
The Act contains several key provisions:

- Establishment of standard units of weights and measures based on the metric system.
- Regulation of manufacturing, selling, and repairing of weights and measures.
- Appointment of legal metrology officers to enforce the Act.
- Penalties for offenses related to weights and measures.

== Implementation ==
The Act came into force on 1 April 2011. It is administered by the Department of Consumer Affairs, Ministry of Consumer Affairs, Food and Public Distribution, Government of India.

== See also ==
- Metrology
- Standards of Weights and Measures Act, 1976
- Indian Institute of Legal Metrology
