= Marabba =

A marabba is a customary unit of area in India and Pakistan approximately equal to 25 acres, (10.117 hectares).

Defined as a square with sides measuring 200 karam. The karam was standardised as 5 1/2 feet by the British making each side 1100 feet. The unit is now used customarily as the visual size of an average crop field. It is thought to derive from the size of crop field necessary to sustain 3 generations of an average family.

After metrification by both countries in the 20th century, the unit was superseded.

== See also ==
- List of customary units of measurement in South Asia
