= Juchart =

Obsolete Swiss unit of area measurement

A Juchart (also Jucharte or Juchard, in French Pose, in Italian Pertica) was a unit of area measurement used in rural Switzerland until the early 20th century. In other German speaking regions it was known as a Joch, Jochart, Jauchart, Jauch, Juck or Juckert. The Juchart was a measurement of the amount of farm land that a man could plow in one day. It is similar to the northern German traditional measurement of a Morgen, which was approximately the amount of land tillable by one man behind an ox in the morning hours of a day. In the French speaking Canton of Vaud a related unit of acreage, the Pose was used.

== Size ==
As with most units of this type, the size of a Juchart varied widely. It depended on the productivity and shape of the land.

Size of the Juchart
| Region (timespan) | Name | Size in m² | Size in acres | Subdivisions |
|---|---|---|---|---|
| Plains (traditional) | Juchart | 4,100–6,200 | 1.0–1.5 acres | 4 Vierlinge or 16 Quärtli |
| Swiss Plateau (traditional) | Juchart | 2,700–3,600 | 0.67–0.89 acres | 4 Vierlinge or 16 Quärtli |
| St. Gallen (traditional) | Tagehri | 1,738 | 0.429 acres | |
| St. Gallen, Graubünden, Vorderrhein (traditional) | Mal | 1,050–1,760 | 0.26–0.43 acres | |
| Graubünden Rhein valley (vineyards, traditional) | Mal | 1,100 | 0.27 acres | |
| Ticino (traditional) | Pertica | 700–850 | 0.17–0.21 acres | Spazzo (4–5 m²), Staggio (7–33 m²) |
| Valais (traditional) | Fischel^{a} | 380–850 | 0.094–0.210 acres | |
| Neuchâtel (traditional) | Journal | 2,700 | 0.67 acres | perche or émine |
| Valais (traditional) | Journal | 6,200 | 1.5 acres | |
| Fribourg (traditional) | Béquille | 135 | 0.033 acres | |
| Moutier (traditional) | Chaîne | 106 | 0.026 acres | |
| Wooded land (traditional) | Juchart | 3,360–4,460 | 0.83–1.10 acres | |
| Meadows (traditional) | Mannwerk/seiteur or faux | 2,900–3,900 | 0.72–0.96 acres | |
| Vaud – Meadows (1822) | Fossorier | 4,500 | 1.1 acres | |
| Vaud (1822) | Pose | 4,500 | 1.1 acres | 8 Fossorier or Ouvrier |
| Ticino (1826) | Pertica | 500 | 0.12 acres | Tavole, Gettate, Once or Quadretti |
| German Switzerland (1838) | Juchart | 3,600 | 0.89 acres | 4 Vierlinge or 16 Quärtli |

Notes ^a Also a unit of grain volume, approx. 12.3–29.7 liters
