= Arshin (length) =

Russian unit of length

Obsolete Russian units of length (the arshin is marked red at the very top)

The arshin (Russian: аршин), or arşın (Ottoman Turkish: آرشين or آرشون), is an obsolete Russian and Turkish unit of length.

== Russia ==
The Russian word arshin used to be variously transcribed as arshin, archeen, archin, archine, arsheen, and arshine.

The Russian arshin had different length at different times. In the 16th century, it was 27 inches. In the 18th century, Peter the Great standardized it to 28 inches or 71.12 cm. The arshin-length ruler was also called arshin.

== Turkey ==
The Turkish "market arşın" was about 27 inches (690 mm) long. The masonry arşın was 75.774 cm on average (mason's arşın = 24 parmak = 240 ḫaṭṭ). The usage of the arşın was gradually abolished in 1931–1933 with the introduction of the metric system.

South Slavic peoples used a unit of length named aršin of several types based on the Turkish arşın, under the influence of the Ottoman Empire, described as "the distance from the fingertips to the shoulder".

== See also ==
- arş, the Ottoman cubit or historical Russian lokot, all of a forearm length, see also ell
- Historical Russian units of measurement

== Sources ==
- "Аршин" . Brockhaus and Efron Encyclopedic Dictionary (in Russian). 1906.
