= Dutch cask =

Dutch cask is a UK unit of weight for butter and cheese.

== Definition ==
The dutch cask is defined as 112 pounds (51 kg), (i.e., equivalent to one long hundredweight or eight stone).

== Conversion ==
1 Dutch cask ≡ 32/21 Tub

1 Dutch cask ≡ 112 pounds(avdp.)

1 Dutch cask ≡ 50.80234544 kg
