= Unglie =

Obsolete unit of measurement used in South Asia

A unglie ("finger") is an obsolete unit of length equal to three-fourths of an inch (1.905 cm) that was used in India and Pakistan. After metrification in both countries, the unit became obsolete.

== See also ==
- List of customary units of measurement in South Asia
