= Persian units of measurement =

Ancient system of weights and measures

An official system of weights and measures was established in the ancient Persian Empire under the Achaemenid dynasty (550–350 BCE). The shekel and mina ("profane" or "sacred") were units of both weight and volume. A shekel or mina weight was equal to the weight of that volume of water. The talent was a measure of weight used for large amounts of coinage. Some related units were used in Persia in the 19th century, and are still used in contemporary Iran.

== Ancient Persian units ==
=== Length ===
Persian unit	Persian name	Relation to previous unit	Metric Value	Imperial Value
digit finger	انگشت (angosht)		≈ 20 mm	≈ 0.8 in
hand	dva	5 aiwas	≈ 100 mm	≈ 4 in
foot	trayas	3 dva	≈ 300 mm	≈ 1 foot
four-hands	remen	4 dva	≈ 400 mm	≈ 16 in
cubit (five-hands)	pank'a dva	5 dva	≈ 500 mm	≈ 20 in
great cubit (six-hands)	(k)swacsh dva	6 dva	≈ 600 mm	≈ 2 ft
pace	pank'a	5 trayas	≈ 1.5 m	≈ 5 ft
ten-foot	daca trayas	2 pank'a	≈ 3 m	≈ 10 ft
hundred-foot	chebel	8 daca trayas	≈ 24 m	≈ 80 ft
league, the distance a horse could walk in one hour.	parasang	250 chebel	≈ 6 km	≈ 3.75 miles
mansion, one day's march on the Royal Road.	(Greek stathmos)	4 or 5 parasang	≈ 24–30 km	≈ 14–18 miles
Asparsa	Asparsa		≈ 187–195 m and = 360 cubits	

=== Volume ===
The shekel and mina ("profane" or "sacred") were units of both weight and volume. A shekel or mina weight was equal to the weight of that volume of water. Note that the values given for the mina do not match the definitions.

1 shekel = 8.3 ml (approximately 1 cubic aiwas).
1 profane mina = 50 shekel = 500 ml (approximately 27 cubic aiwas).
1 sacred mina = 60 shekel = 600 ml (approximately 1 cubic dva).
1 talent (volume) = 60 profane mina = 25 liters (approximately 1 cubic trayas).

=== Weight ===
The talent was a measure of weight used for large amounts of coinage (bullion, bulk coin), rather than an individual coin. Seven Babylonian talents equalled ten Attic talents, according to a list of the revenues of Cyrus the Great recorded in Herodotus.

𐎣𐎼𐏁 (karša) or 𐎣𐎼𐏁𐎹𐎠 (karšayā) is a unit of weight equal to 10 Babylonian shekels or 1/6 Babylonian mina weighing approximately 83 g (2.9 oz).

== Units used in modern Persia (Iran) ==
Some related units were used in Persia in the 19th century, and are still used in contemporary Iran.

=== Length ===
1 arsani or ulna = 52–64 cm.
1 arish = 38.27 inches (97.21 cm)
1 chebel = 40 arsani = 21–25 meters or 23–30 yards.
1 farsang (parasang) = 6.23 km in 19th century Persia.
1 farsang = 10 kilometers in modern Iran and Turkey.

=== Volume ===
1 chenica = 1.32 liters.
