= Arş =

Turkish unit of length

An arş (Ottoman Turkish آرش) is an old Turkish unit of length.

The word means 'forearm' and thus the measure corresponds to a cubit.

== See also ==
- arşın, the Ottoman yard
