= Esterling =

The esterling is an obsolete Belgian unit of mass.

- 1 esterling = 1/20 ounce
