= Hat'h =

Obsolete unit of length in India

A hat'h (hath, hand, cubit, moolum or mulam) is an obsolete unit of length in India equal to 24 angli (approximately 18 inches) or 2 hat'h to a gaz (approximately 1 yard). The unit was used in Mumbai (formerly Bombay) and in Bengal After metrication in the mid-20th century, the unit became obsolete.

== See also ==
- List of customary units of measurement in South Asia
