= Tub (unit) =

Tub was a unit of capacity or of weight used in Britain and elsewhere.

== British unit for butter and cheese ==
British laws for the sale of goods defined a tub of butter as a receptacle of a size which could contain 84 pounds of butter.

=== Definition ===
1 tub of butter or cheese = 84 pounds

=== Conversion ===
1 tub = 1.5 Firkin (1 Firkin = 56 lbs)

=== Metric equivalent ===
1 tub = 38 kg

== Other commodities ==
The Oxford English Dictionary has quotations illustrating other values of a "tub" as a unit:

- Tea (1706): "about 60 pounds"
- "Camphire" (1706): "from 56 to 86 pounds"
- Vermilion (1706): "3 to 4 hundred weight" (i.e. 336-448 pounds)
- Camphor (1858): "130 Dutch lbs"

In Newfoundland, Canada, a tub of coal was defined as 100 pounds, while a tub of herrings was 16 Imperial gallons and a tub of salt was 18 Imperial gallons.
