= Jow (unit) =

Obsolete unit of length in India

A jow (also called a jacob) is an obsolete unit of length in India approximately equal 0.25 inch (about 0.63 cm). After metrication in India in the mid-20th century, the unit became obsolete.

== See also ==
- List of customary units of measurement in South Asia
