= Sana lamjel =

Unit of length used in Manipur, India

Sana lamjei (Lam onnanaba chei) was a customary unit of length used in the erstwhile kingdom of Manipur, now a state of India. The unit of length, defined by the ruler of the kingdom, Nongda Lairen Pakhangpa in 33 CE, being equal to the distance from the floor to the tips of the fingers of his raised right hand while standing (a fathom), plus 4 fingerwidths.

The and unit became a standard for land measurement. An area of 50×60 sana lamjei was equal to 1 pari. 1 pari was 2 lourak, 4 sangam, 8 loukhai, 16 loushel, or 32 tong.

The value was later redefined by King Khagemba (1597–1652) to be defined by distance between and the fingertips of that his outstretched arms, plus 4 fingerwidths. After metrication in India in the mid-20th century, the unit became obsolete.

== See also ==
- List of customary units of measurement in South Asia
