= Ankanam =

Indian unit of measure similar to an acre

An Ankanam is a unit of measure similar to an acre. It is used mainly in regions of Andhra Pradesh and Karnataka, Nellore, Anekal, Bengaluru and Tirupati. An Ankanam is measured as 72 sq ft (6.7 m^{2}), (mostly in the Nellore District) and, in some places (such as Tirupati), 36 sq ft (3.3 m^{2}). In Nellore, one acre equals 605 Ankanams, and 1 cent amounts to 6.05 Ankanams.

== Etymology and definitions ==
Ankanam is related to the words anga and adugu in dravidian languages (meaning foot). In “Kannada-English Dictionary by Rev. Ferdinand Kittel”. “Ankana” is defined as follows. “The (small or large) space either between any two posts or pillars in a wall that support the roof, or between any two beams”. Also from the reference of Hindu temple architecture 'Ankana' is defined as distance between pillar and pillar on one hand, and between one pillar and another (wall) on the other. Hence it has no definitive measurement.
