= Stuck (unit) =

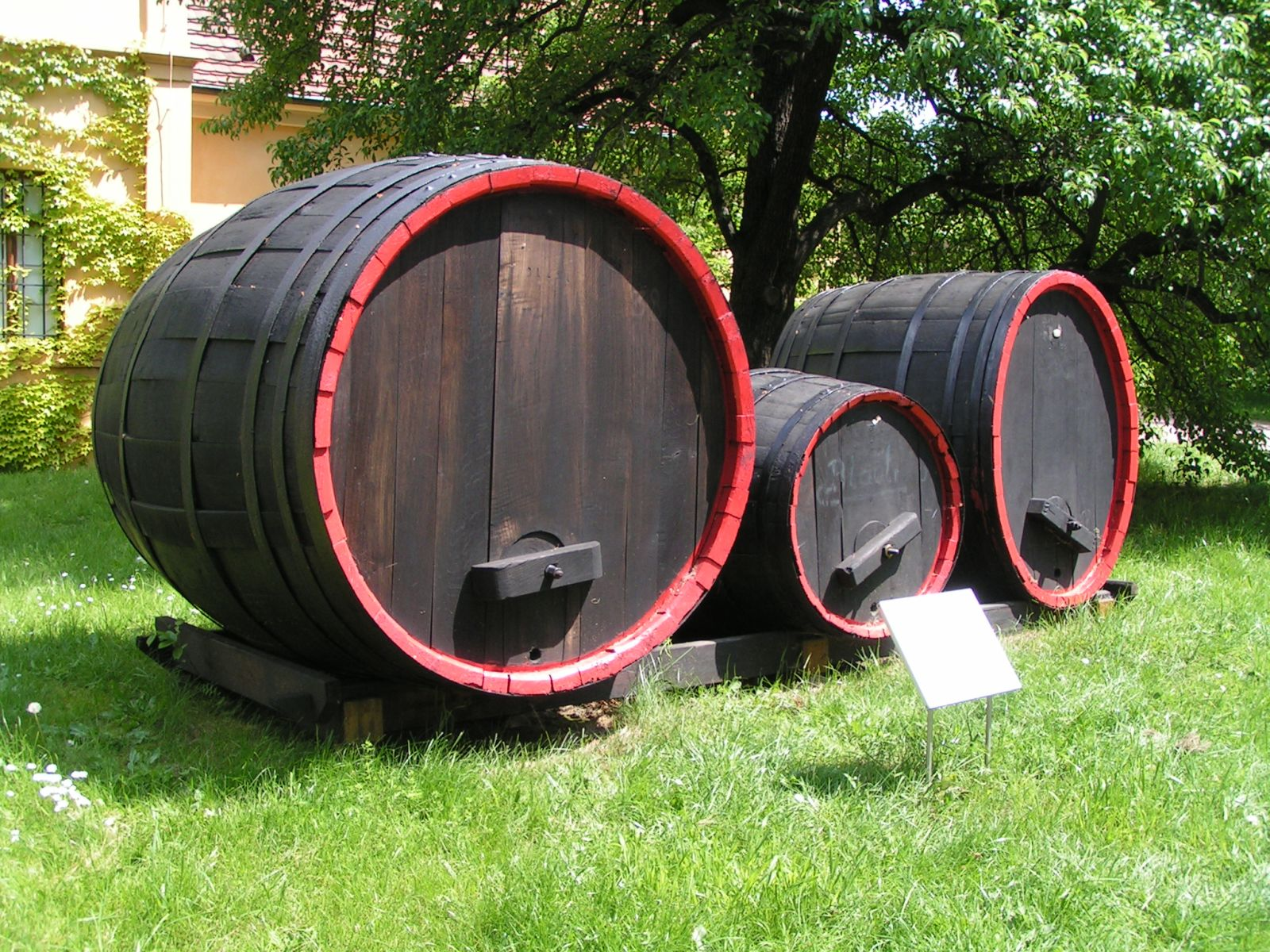
German wine casks: on the right is a Stückfass of 1400 L

Stuck was a form occasionally found in English writing as a corruption of the German "Stück", itself an abbreviation of Stückfass (formerly written Stückfaß), referring to the volume of a wine cask of around 1,000–1,200 L (220–260 imp gal; 260–320 US gal). It was normally used in reference to German wine production.
