= Guz =

Unit of length used in South Asia

- Unit of: Length

Conversions
1 guz in ...	... is equal to ...
- Imperial units: 3 feet (36 inches)
- SI base units: 0.9144 m

A guz (also spelled gaz, from Hindustani गज़/گز and Persian گز), or Mughal yard, is a unit of length used in parts of Asia. Historically, it was a regionally variable measurement similar to the English yard both in size and in that it was often used for measuring textiles. Values of the guz ranged from 24 to 41 inches (610 to 1,040 mm) over time. Today, it is generally used in the Indian subcontinent as the word for a yard. A present day sari is still measured as 7 guz while a traditional one can be as long as 9 guz.

== History ==
Use of the guz in India was first established during the Mughal Empire. The guz in Rajasthan at the end of the 17th century was quoted as being 28 1/2 inches (720 mm). By 1875, the average value of the guz in Bengal was 36 inches (1.0 yd; 910 mm), but was 33 inches (840 mm) in Madras and 27 inches (690 mm) in Bombay.

By the 20th century, the guz was uniformly quoted as being equal in length to one yard in the English system, or 0.91 metres in the metric system. But there are some different values still in use, like Bikaner has 1 guz/gaz = 2 ft officially recognized and in use.

The guz is still commonly used in the Indian subcontinent. It has become the standard word in Hindi and Urdu for "yard".

== Name ==
The word guz (also spelled guzz, at the time) entered the Oxford English Dictionary in the late 19th century, having been originally submitted by the noted lexicographer William Chester Minor, originally as being equal to 28 4/5 inches (730 mm) in India (so that "5 guzz = 4 yards"). The word also is reputed to have given the Royal Navy base at HMNB Devonport, in Plymouth, the affectionate nickname of "Guzz", as sailors referring to the Dockyard, used to regularly abbreviate the word to simply "The Yard", leading to the slang use of the Hindi word for the unit of measurement of the same name.

== Regional definitions ==
=== Arabia ===
In Arabia, it varied between 27 and 37 inches (690 and 940 mm).

=== Persia ===
In Persia, it was reported in the 1880s that 1 guz was 37 1/2 inches (950 mm) for cloth, but 27 inches (690 mm) for silk and carpet.

=== Nepal ===
In Nepal, 1 guz was 1 yard (0.91 m) in the 20th century.

=== Southeast Asia ===
1 Malay gaz is around 33 inches (2.8 feet) or 83.82 centimetres.
