= Bahar (unit) =

Obsolete unit of measurement

The bahar (Arabic: بـهـﺭ) is an obsolete unit of measurement.

- In Iran it was a unit of length approximately equal to 3.25 cm (1.28 in).
- In Oman, it was a unit of mass equal to approximately 880 kg (1,940 lb).
