= Seer (unit) =

Traditional Asian unit of mass and volume

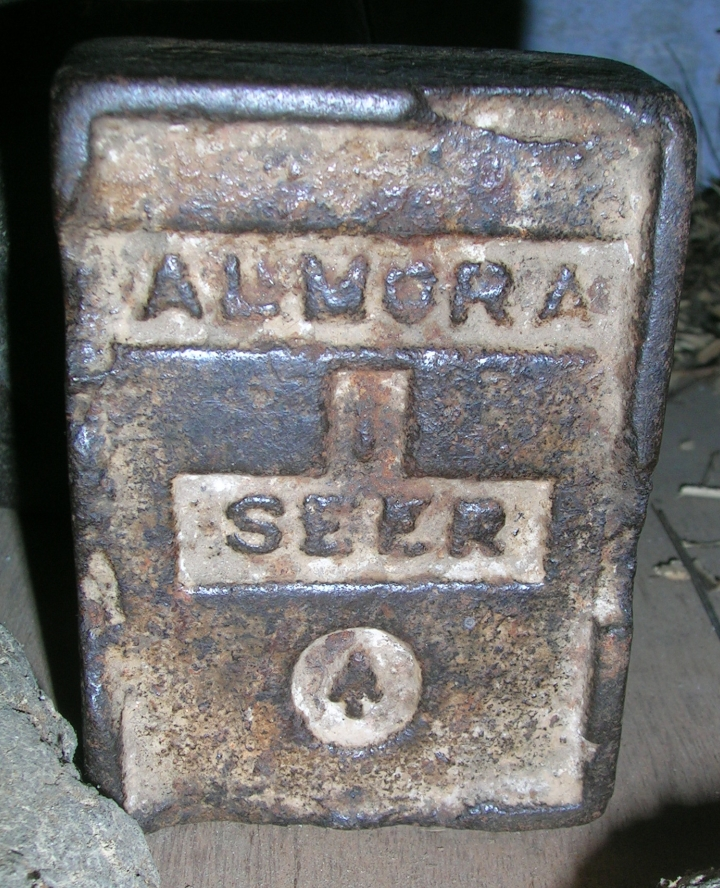
A standard seer from Almora, India.

A Seer (also sihr) is a traditional unit of mass and volume used in large parts of Asia before the middle of the 20th century. It is still in use in only a few countries, such as Afghanistan, Iran, and parts of India, though in Iran it denotes a smaller unit of weight than in India.

== India ==
In India, the seer was a traditional unit used mostly in Northern India, including the Urdu-speaking region, and in Hyderabad in the South. Officially, seer was defined by the Standards of Weights and Measures Act (No. 89 of 1956, amended in 1960 and 1964) as being exactly equal to 1.25 kilograms (2.8 lb). However, there were many local variants of the seer in India. Note the chart below gives maund weight for Mumbai, divide by 40 to get a seer.

| Bengal | 80 tolas of rice |
| South India | mass of 24 current rupees |
| Chennai (formerly Madras) | approx 25 lb (11 kg) |
| Gujarat | mass of 40 local rupees |
| Mumbai | 28 lb (13 kg) called the Old Seer |
| Maharashtra | Equivalent to Kilogram |

== Aden, Nepal and Pakistan ==
In Aden (Oman), Nepal, and Pakistan a seer was approximately 0.93310 kg (2.0571 lb) derived from the Government seer of British colonial days.

== Afghanistan ==
In Afghanistan, it was a unit of mass equal to approximately 7.066 kg (15.58 lb).

== Persia/Iran ==
In Persia (and later Iran), it was and remains in two units:

1. The metric seer was 75.0 g (2.65 oz)
2. The seer (sihr) was 160.0 g (5.64 oz)

The smaller weight is now part of the national weight system in Iran and is used on daily basis for small measures of delicate foodstuff and choice produce.

== Sri Lanka ==
In Sri Lanka, it was a measure of capacity, approximately 1.86 imperial pints (1.06 L).

== See also ==
- List of customary units of measurement in South Asia
