= Dry measure =

Units of volume for non-liquid commodities

Dry measures are units of volume to measure bulk commodities that are not fluids and that were typically shipped and sold in standardized containers such as barrels. They have largely been replaced by the units used for measuring volumes in the metric system and liquid volumes in the imperial system but are still used for some commodities in the US customary system. They were or are typically used in agriculture, agronomy, and commodity markets to measure grain, dried beans, dried and fresh produce, and some seafood. They were formerly used for many other foods, such as salt pork and salted fish, and for industrial commodities such as coal, cement, and lime.

The names are often the same as for the units used to measure liquids, despite representing different volumes. The larger volumes of the dry measures apparently arose because they were based on heaped rather than "struck" (leveled) containers.

Today, many units nominally of dry measure have become standardized as units of mass (see bushel); and many other units are commonly conflated or confused with units of mass.

== Metric units ==
In the original metric system, the unit of dry volume was the stere, equal to a one-meter cube, but this is not part of the modern metric system; the liter and the cubic meter are now used. However, the stere is still widely used for firewood.

== Imperial and US customary units ==
In US customary units, three units of volume exist both in a dry and a liquid version, with the same name but different values—the dry barrel, the dry quart, and the dry pint—while the bushel and peck are only used for dry goods.

Imperial units of volume are the same for both dry and liquid goods, and have a different value from both the dry and liquid US versions of the pint and quart: an imperial pint and quart are 20.095% larger than their US liquid counterparts and 3.21% larger than their US dry counterparts, whereas the imperial peck and imperial bushel were deleted from the relevant UK statute in 1968.

Many of the units are associated with particular goods, and there are also special measures for specific goods, such as the cord of wood, the sack, the bale of wool or cotton, the box of fruit, etc.

Because it is difficult to measure actual volume and easy to measure mass, many of these units are now also defined as units of mass, specific to each commodity, so a bushel of apples is a different weight from a bushel of wheat (weighed at a specific moisture level). Indeed, the bushel, the best-known unit of dry measure as the quoted unit in commodity markets, is a unit of mass in those contexts.

Conversely, the ton used in specifying tonnage and in freight calculations is often a volume measurement rather than a mass measurement.

In US cooking, dry and liquid measures are the same: the cup, the tablespoon, the teaspoon.

In the US, the dry quart and dry pint are exactly 15121/92400 larger than their liquid counterparts, while the dry barrel is exactly 1/33 smaller than the fluid barrel, except for barrels of beer (dry barrels are exactly 5/341 smaller) and barrels of oil (dry barrels are exactly 3/11 smaller).

== Struck and heaped measurement ==
The volume of bulk goods is usually measured by filling a standard container, so the containers' names and the units' names are often the same, and indeed both are called "measures". Normally, a level or struck measure is assumed, with the excess being swept off level ("struck") with the measure's brim—the stick used for this is called a "strickle". Sometimes heaped or heaping measures are used, with the commodity heaped in a cone above the measure.

There was historically a tendency for landowners to demand heaped bushels of commodities from their peasants, while at the same time peasants were obliged to purchase commodities from stricken containers. Rules outlawing this practice were circumvented through use of heavy round strickles, which would compress the contents of a bushel.

=== US units of dry measure ===
unit	symbol	inches^{3}	volume	Imperial equivalent
1 pint	pt	33.6003125	550.6104713575 ml	0.9689390 pints
1 quart	qt	67.200625	1.101220942715 L	1.9378779 pints
1 peck	pk	537.605	8.80976754172 L	1.9378779 gallons
1 bushel	bu	2,150.42	35.23907016688 L	7.7515118 gallons
1 barrel	bbl	7,056	115.627123584 L	25.4344115 gallons
