= Metrication in India =

Metrication, or the conversion to a measurement system based on the International System of Units (SI), occurred in India in stages between 1955 and 1962. The metric system in weights and measures was adopted by the Indian Parliament in December 1956 with the Standards of Weights and Measures Act, which took effect beginning 1 October 1958. The Indian Coinage Act was passed in 1955 by the Government of India to introduce decimal coinage in the country. The new system of coins became legal tender in April 1957, where the rupee consists of 100 paise. For the next five years, both the old and new systems were legal. In April 1962, all other systems were banned. This process of metrication is called "big-bang" route, which is to simultaneously outlaw the use of pre-metric measurement, metricate, reissue all government publications and laws, and change the education systems to metric.

India's conversion was quicker than that of many other countries, including its coloniser, the United Kingdom. This was helped by low popular literacy and the fact that there was previously no nationwide standard measurement system—British imperial units were used by the upper class, while various regional systems were used by the poor. The Indian model was extremely successful and served later as a model for metrication in various African and Asian countries.

The National Physical Laboratory of India, located in New Delhi, is designated the maintainer of SI units in India. It also calibrates the national standards of weights and measures.

== History ==
Before metrication, the government of India followed the Indian Weights and Measures Act passed in 1870 which used the British imperial system. However, many other indigenous systems were in use in other parts of the country and this was a constant problem with government officials and the public at large.

Phanindranath Seth was the founder and secretary of the Indian Decimal Society, whose aim it was to push for the introduction of the metric system in India. P. N. Seth was assisted by others in the society, such as professors Dr Hirallal Roy, Dr Sisir Kumar Mitra, and Prasanta Chandra Mahalanobis, and other leading Indian scientists. Since 1930, they advocated for discarding the old chaotic system by writing in newspapers, journals, participating in debates and distributing literature.

During the post-WWII interim government, there were attempts to introduce some standardisation in weights and measures but the conservative section of the ruling party never allowed it to be passed. Then, outstanding scientific personalities and public figures were mobilised by the Indian Decimal Society. P. N. Seth put forward a scheme for metrication of currency on 17 January 1944, which was finally adopted in the Indian Parliament in 1955.

== Common usage today ==
Today, the metric system serves as the primary standard for all official measurements in India and its use is mandated by the Legal Metrology Act, 2009, though in everyday usage, Indians may still refer to imperial units.

=== Exceptions ===
- Body heights are sometimes measured in feet and inches.
- The heights of mountains are still mostly recorded in feet.
- The Indian numbering system of crores and lakhs is used.
- Tyre rim diameters are still measured in inches, as used worldwide.
- Body temperature is still sometimes measured in degrees Fahrenheit.
- Industries like the construction and property still use metric and imperial, though it is more common for area to be advertised in square feet and acres.
- Bulk cotton is sold in candies (0.35 imperial tons, 355.62 kg) or bales (170 kg).
- The motor industry still uses brake horsepower (Bhp) for engine power.
- Tyre tubes and carbonated beverages are filled in pounds per square inch.
- Clothing sizes are given in an integers of inches.
- Shoes sizes increments are a third of an inch.
- Football pitches are measured by length in yards and height in feet.
- Display sizes for screens on television sets and computer monitors and measured diagonally in inches.
- Like in most countries, aviation altitude is measured in feet.

== See also ==
- Metric system
- Metrication
