= Narrow-gauge railways in Sweden =

Narrow-gauge railways

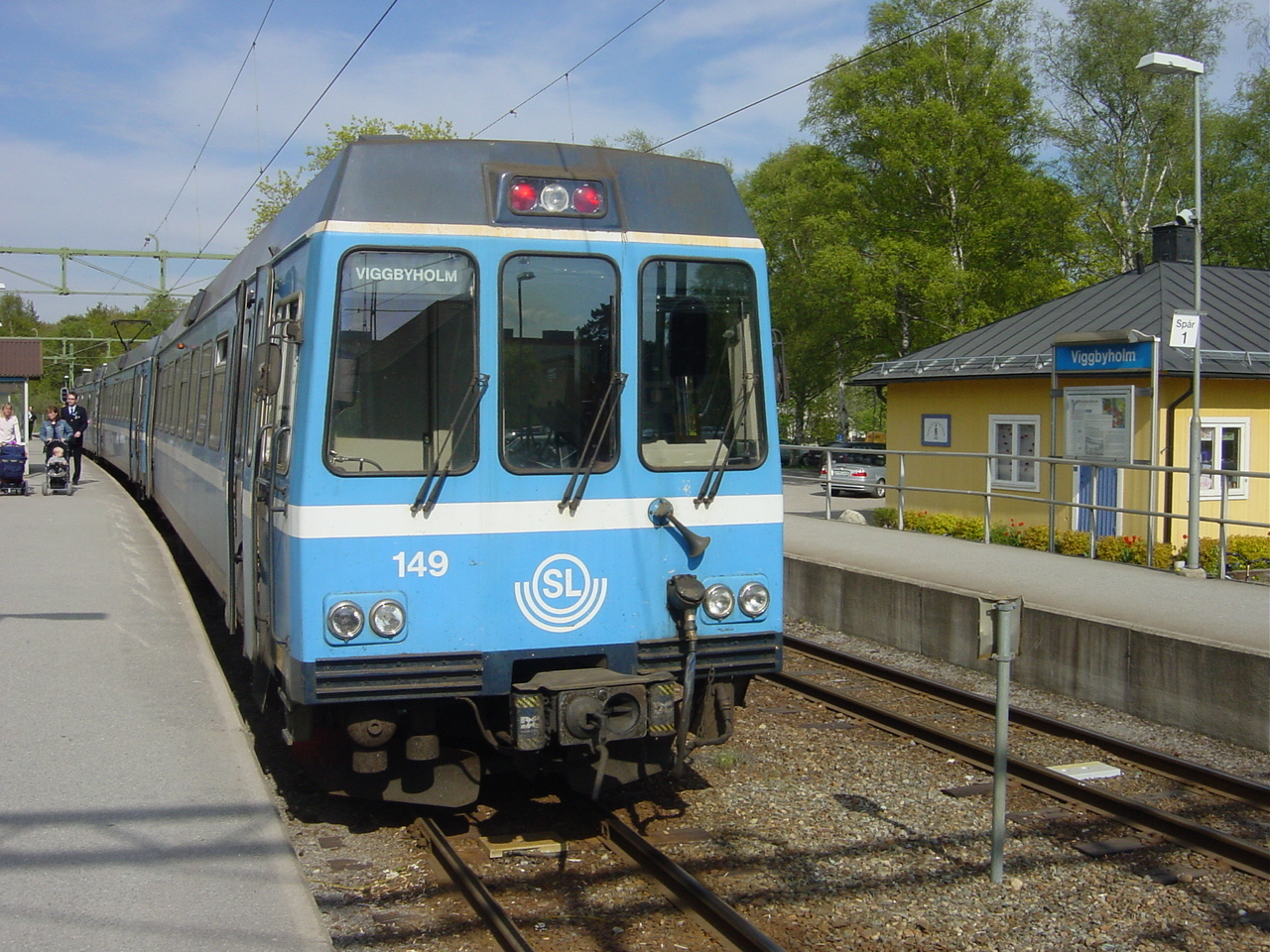
The Roslagsbanan railway (891 mm), Stockholm County

Sweden once had some fairly extensive narrow-gauge networks, but most narrow-gauge railways are now closed. Some were physically converted to 1,435 mm (4 ft 8 1/2 in) standard gauge (the latest one the line between Berga and Kalmar in the 1970s) and some remain as heritage railways. The most common narrow gauge, 891 mm (2 ft 11 3/32 in) (3 Swedish feet), exists only in Sweden. A smaller 3 ft 6 in (1,067 mm) gauge network existed, and 600 mm (1 ft 11 5/8 in) gauge was used mostly by smaller, industrial railways. Still other but lesser used gauges in the country were 693 mm (2 ft 3 9/32 in), 802 mm (2 ft 7 9/16 in), 1,099 mm (3 ft 7 1/4 in), 1,188 mm (3 ft 10 25/32 in) and 1,217 mm (3 ft 11 29/32 in), all converted or removed.

== 1,217 mm (3 ft 11 29/32 in) railway lines ==
1,217 mm is equal to 4.1 Swedish feet. Compatible with 4 English feet (4 ft or 1,219 mm).

- Borås–Herrljunga Järnväg; 42 km (26 mi), converted to 1,435 mm (4 ft 8 1/2 in) standard gauge in 1898
- Uddevalla–Vänersborg–Herrljunga Järnväg; converted to standard gauge.
- Hudiksvalls Järnväg; 16 km (9.9 mi), converted to standard gauge.
- Söderhamns Järnväg; 15 km (9.3 mi), converted to standard gauge.

== 1,188 mm (3 ft 10 25/32 in) railway line ==
1,188 mm is equal to 4 Swedish feet.

- Engelsberg–Norberg Railway, converted to standard gauge in 1876.
- Väsman–Barkens Järnväg; 18.2 km (11.3 mi), closed in 1903.

== 1,099 mm (3 ft 7 17/64 in) railway line ==
1,099 mm (3 ft 7 1/4 in) is equal to 44.42 pre 1863 Swedish inches

- Christinehamn–Sjöändans järnväg; (converted to standard gauge)

== 1,093 mm (3 ft 7 in) railway line ==
This unique 1,093 mm (3 ft 7 in) gauge was created by a measure mistake. It was planned to be 3 ft 6 in (3 ft 7 in with Swedish units) but became 3 ft 7 in English units.

- Köping–Uttersberg–Riddarhyttan Railway, closed in 1968.

== 1,067 mm (3 ft 6 in) railway lines ==
Southern Sweden had a small 1,067 mm (3 ft 6 in) network, reaching for example Halmstad, Växjö, Torsås, Karlskrona, Ronneby, Karlshamn, and Kristianstad. As most of the railways in the province of Blekinge had this gauge, it was nicknamed "Blekinge gauge" in Sweden. All track is either demolished or rebuilt to 1,435 mm (4 ft 8 1/2 in) standard gauge.

A few smaller lines also had this gauge:

- Åre Bergbana
- Sundsvall–Torpshammar Railway

== 891 mm (2 ft 11 3/32 in) railway lines ==
891 mm is equal to three Swedish feet.

Two large networks existed, separated by lake Vättern. The western one covered much of the province of Västergötland, from Gothenburg in the southwest to Hjo in the east and Gullspång in the north. The eastern network covered much of the provinces of Småland and Östergötland, stretching from Växjö and Torsås in the south to Örebro in the north. There were also smaller 891 mm (2 ft 11 3/32 in) networks on Gotland and in Uppland, as well as separate lines in other regions, among them Öland. Plans for connecting the two main networks were made but never fulfilled.

Some lines were converted to 1,435 mm (4 ft 8 1/2 in) standard gauge, while most lines have been dismantled. In the 21st century, only the Roslagsbanan commuter rail still functions as a commercial railway. There is also tourist or heritage traffic on some lines.

- Djursholmsbanan
- Gotland Hesselby Railway
- Roslagsbanan
- Stockholm–Roslagens Järnvägar
- Stortyskarna
- Upsala–Lenna Jernväg

== 802 mm (2 ft 7 9/16 in) railway lines ==
802 mm (31.6 in) is equal to 2.7 Swedish feet.

- Bredsjö–Degerfors Järnväg; 97 km (60 mi), partly closed, partly converted to 1,435 mm (4 ft 8 1/2 in) in 1907.
- Bredsjö–Grängens Järnväg; 15 km (9.3 mi), closed in 1977
- Hällefors–Fredriksbergs Järnvägar; closed in stages after 1940, finally ceased in 1970
- Striberg–Grängens Järnväg; 28.2 km (17.5 mi), converted to 1,435 mm in 1907
- Vikern–Möckelns Järnväg; 54.5 km (33.9 mi), closed in 1953
- Voxna–Lobonäs Järnväg; 28.86 km (17.93 mi), closed in 1932

== 600 mm (1 ft 11 5/8 in) railway lines ==
Numerous 600 mm (1 ft 11 5/8 in) gauge agricultural and industrial railways were built. Nowadays a few are in use as tourist railways with steam trains.

- Anneberg–Ormaryds Järnväg; 7 km (4.3 mi), defunct
- Bläse kalkbrottet–Bläse hamnen line; 2.2 km (1.4 mi), defunct
- Böda Skogsjärnväg; 5 km (3.1 mi), 27 km (17 mi), defunct (part rebuilt as a heritage railway)
- Helsingborg–Råå–Ramlösa Järnväg (HRRJ); 8.2 km (5.1 mi), converted to standard gauge
- Jönköping–Gripenbergs Järnväg; 44 km (27 mi), defunct
- Kosta–Lessebo Järnväg; 60 km (37 mi), defunct
- Munkedals Jernväg; near Munkedal in Bohuslän, 5.6 km (3.5 mi), partly converted to standard gauge, partly remains operating as heritage.
- Nättraby–Alnaryd–Älmeboda Järnväg (NAEJ); 45 km (28 mi), defunct
- Ohsabanan; between Bor and Os, Värnamo in Småland, 14.5 km (9.0 mi), operating
- Örkaggens Järnväg; 2.3 km (1.4 mi), private, operating
- Östra Södermanlands Järnväg; 10.8 km (6.7 mi), operating
- Risten-Lakvik Museum Railway; using part of the former Norsholm-Västervik-Hultsfred line, in southern Östergötland between Norrköping and Åtvidaberg, operating
- Stavsjö Järnväg; 17.7 km (11.0 mi), defunct

== See also ==
- Swedish units of measurement
