= Åtting =

Scandinavian historical unit of measurement

An åtting (also known in Continental Scandinavian languages as atting, åttung, attung, or otting, and in Icelandic as áttungur), literally meaning an "eighth", is a historical unit of measurement in Scandinavia. The term has had a wide variety of uses.

== As a unit of land ==
In medieval Sweden, the åtting (usually in this sense referred to with the form attung) was a common unit of measurement for usable arable land (though not for area in general). Opinions differ as to what an attung corresponded to, but according to some it was a measure that corresponded to the arable and pasture area that a normal-sized family could support themselves on, in the Middle Ages about twelve acres or six hectares. The attung is often mentioned in purchase documents during the period 1180–1220 in the Swedish provinces of Uppland, Närke, Värmland, Östergötland and Öland, among others. As a measure of area in this sense, the attung remained longest in Östergötland and some of the Småland regions that also belonged to the Östgöta lagsaga (such as Kinda, Ydre, Tjust and Tveta).

In a separate usage, the åtting was used in to mean one eighth of a large territorial unit such as a härad or fylke.

== As a unit of volume ==
As a unit of volume, an åtting was originally an eighth of a tun (Norwegian tønne). The value of a tun itself varied across time and space.

In Norway, an åtting of fluids, butter or fish was equivalent to seventeen potter or, after 1824, 16.4 litres. An åtting of grain was equivalent to one eighth of a corn-tun (korntønne) or eighteen potter or, after 1824, 17,37 litres. In Sweden (and present-day Finland), a 1665 chart of weights and measures put the åtting at six kannor (jugs) or 15.7 litres.

== Other uses ==
In Oppdal in Norway, åtting could also refer to a small roll of chewing tobacco (half of a kvartrull or quarter-roll).

== See also ==
- Barrel of land
