= Geographical mile =

Unit of length of approximately 1855.3 m

Conversions
1 geographical mile in ...	... is equal to ...
- SI units: ~1,855.3 m
- imperial/US units: ~1.1528 mi or ~6,087 ft

The geographical mile is an international unit of length determined by 1 minute of arc (1/60 degree) along the Earth's equator. For the international ellipsoid 1924 this equalled 1855.4 metres. The American Practical Navigator 2017 defines the geographical mile as 6,087.08 feet (1,855.342 m). Greater precision depends more on the choice of the Earth's radius of the used ellipsoid than on more careful measurement, since the radius of the geoid varies more than 100 metres (328.084 ft) along the equator. In any ellipsoid, the length of a degree of longitude at the equator is exactly 60 geographical miles. The Earth's radius at the equator in the GRS80 ellipsoid is 6,378,137.0000 m, which makes the geographical mile 1,855.3248 m. The rounding of the Earth's radius to metres in GRS80 has an effect of 0.0001 m.

The shape of the Earth is a slightly flattened sphere, which results in the Earth's circumference being 0.168% larger when measured around the equator as compared to through the poles. The geographical mile is slightly larger than the nautical mile (which was historically linked to the circumference measured through both poles); one geographic mile is equivalent to approximately 1.00178 nautical miles.

== Historical units ==
Historically, certain nations used slightly different divisions to create their geographical miles.

The Portuguese system derived their miles (milha geográfica) as one third of their league of three separate values. When each equatorial degree was divided into 18 leagues, the geographical mile was equal to 1/54 degree or about 2.06 kilometres (1.28 mi); when divided into 20 leagues, the geographical mile was equal to 1/60 degree, approximating the values provided above; and when divided into 25 leagues, the geographical mile was equal to 1/75 degree or about 1.48 kilometres (0.92 mi).

The geographical miles of the traditional Dutch (geografische mijl), German (geographische Meile or Landmeile), and Danish systems (geografisk mil) all approximated their much longer miles—equivalent to English leagues—by using a larger division of the equatorial degree. Instead of using one minute of arc, they all used four—1/15 degree—to produce a distance now notionally equal to 7,408 metres (24,304 ft) but actually differing slightly depending on official measurements and computations. (For example, the Danish unit was computed as equivalent to about 7,421.5 metres (24,349 ft) by the astronomer Ole Rømer.)

== Relationship with the nautical mile ==
The geographical mile is closely related to the nautical mile, which was originally determined as 1 minute of arc along a great circle of the Earth but is nowadays defined by treaty as exactly 1,852 m. The US National Institute of Standards and Technology notes that "The international nautical mile of 1,852 meters (6,076.115 49... feet) was adopted effective July 1, 1954, for use in the United States. The value formerly used in the United States was 6,080.20 feet = 1 nautical (geographical or sea) mile." This deprecated value of 6,080.2 feet is equivalent to 1,853.24 m. A separate reference identifies the geographic mile as being identical to the international nautical mile of 1,852 m and slightly shorter than the British nautical mile of 6,080 feet (1,853.18 m).

=== Scandinavian nautical mile ===
Scandinavians used their own version of the geographical mile as their nautical mile up to the beginning of the 20th century (with continued regional use), indigenously known as a sea mile (Danish: sømil, Norwegian: sjømil, Swedish: sjömil). It was defined as 1/15 of an equatorial degree (1/360° of longitude), equivalent to approximately four modern nautical miles or "medium meridian minutes" (4 × 1,852 m) – a nautical mile is approximately one sixtieth of a degree along a meridian (1/60 meridian degree).

During metrification in 1875, this brought it down to about 7,420 m (24,340 ft) from its former equivalence of 3950 fathoms (Bokmål: favn, Swedish: famn) or about 7,435 m (24,393 ft).

== Use ==
The unit is not used much in English-speaking countries but is cited in some United States laws. For example, Section 1301(a) of the Submerged Lands Act defines state seaward boundaries in terms of geographic miles. While debating what became the Land Ordinance of 1785, Thomas Jefferson's committee wanted to divide the public lands in the west into "hundreds of ten geographical miles square, each mile containing 6,086 and 4-10ths of a foot" and "sub-divided into lots of one mile square each, or 850 and 4-10ths of an acre".

== See also ==
- Conversion of units
- Medieval weights and measures for details of the geographical league of France
- Mile for the various other miles in use
- Nautical mile
