= Norwegian units of measurement =

As in the case of the Danes, the Norwegians' earliest standards of measure can be derived from their ship burials. The 60-Norwegian-feet-long Kvalsund ship (18.8 m; 61.8 ft) was built ca. 700 AD and differs from the Danish boats less than it does from the Oseberg, Gokstad and Tune ships which all date from ca. 800 AD. Thwarts are typically spaced about 3 Norwegian feet (0.94 m; 3.1 ft) apart.

In 1541, an alen in Denmark and Norway was defined by law to be the Sjælland alen. Subsequently, the alen was defined by law as 2 Rhine feet from 1683. From 1824, the basic unit was defined as a fot being derived from astronomy as the length of a one-second pendulum times 12/38 at a latitude of 45°. The metric system was introduced in Norway in 1875, with Norway being one of the original signatories of the meter convention.

== Length ==
- skruppel – scruple, 1/12 linje or approx. 0.18 mm.
- linje – line, 1/12 tomme or approx. 2.18 mm
- tomme – thumb (inch), 1/12 fot, approx. 26.1 mm. This unit was commonly used for measuring timber until the 1970s. Nowadays, the word refers invariably to the English inch, 25.4 mm.
- kvarter – quarter, 1/4 alen.
- fot – foot, 1/2 alen. From 1824, 313.74 mm.
- alen – forearm or ell, 627.48 mm from 1824, 627.5 mm from 1683, 632.6 mm from 1541. Before that, local variants.
- favn – fathom (pl. favner), 3 alen, 1.882 m.
- stang – rod, 5 alen or 3.1374 m
- lås – 15 favner, 28.2 m
- fjerdingsvei – quarter mile, alt. fjerding, 1/4 mil, i.e. 2.82 km.
- mil or landmil – Norwegian mile, spelled miil prior to 1862, 18,000 alen (36,000 feet, 7.018 miles or 11.295 km). Before 1683, a mil was defined as 17600 alen or 11.13 km. Another old land-mile, 11.824 km. The unit survives to this day, but in a metric 10 km adaptation
- rast –lit. "rest", the old name of the mil. A suitable distance between rests when walking. Believed to be approx. 9 km before 1541.
- Kaffekok, a similar term to rast used in the north by the indigenous Sami people.
- steinkast – stone's throw, perhaps 25 favner, used to this day as a very approximate measure of a short distance.

=== Nautical ===
- favn – fathom (pl. favner), 3 alen, 1.85 m
- kabellengde – cable length, 100 favner, 185,2 m, or 1/10 international nautical mile, 185.2 m
- kvartmil – quarter mile, 10 kabellengder, 1852 m. Kvartmil was a quarter of a Sjømil.
- sjømil – sea mile, now often (but wrongly) the international nautical mile, 1.852 km, but also used for other nautical miles and the geografisk mil. Sjømil was 3950 fathoms.
- geografisk mil – 7421 m or 4.007 nautical miles, defined as 1/15 Equatorial degree or 4 minutes of arc.

== Area ==
- mål – 100 kvadratrode, 984 m². The unit survives to this day, but in a 1000 m² adaptation, synonym for the metric decare (dekar in Norwegian).
- kvadratrode – square stang, 9.84 m²
- tønneland – "barrel of land", 4 mål

== Volume ==
- favn – 1 alen by 1 favn by 1 favn, 2.232 m³, used for measuring firewood to this day.
- skjeppe – 1/8 tønne, i.e. 17.4 L.
- tønne – barrel, 4.5 fot³, 138.9 L.

== Weight ==
- ort – 0.9735 g (1/512 pund)
- mark (pl. merker) –, 1/2 pund, 249.4 g, 218.7 g before 1683.
- pund – Pound, alt. skålpund, 2 merker 0.4984 kg, was 0.46665 kg before 1683
- laup – used for butter, 17.93 kg (approx. 16.2 L). 1 laup is 36 pund or 4 spann or 72 merker.
- spann – Same as laup, for other commodities such as grain
- bismerpund – 12 pund, 5.981 kg
- vette – 28.8 mark or 6.2985 kg.
- våg – 1/8 skippund, 17.9424 kg.
- skippund – ship's pound, 159.488 kg. Was about 151 kg in 1270.

== Monetary ==
- skilling – Shilling.
- mark – 16 skilling.
- ort – 24 skilling.
- riksdaler – Until 1813, Norwegian thaler. 1 riksdaler is 4 ort or 6 mark or 96 skilling.
- speciedaler – Since 1816. 1 speciedaler is 5 ort or 120 skilling. From 1876, 1 speciedaler is 4 kroner (Norwegian crown, NOK).

== Miscellaneous ==
- tylft – 12, also dusin
- snes – 20
- skokk – 60
- stort hundre – Large hundred, 120
- stabel or stort tusen – "stack" / Large thousand 1200 (used about planks)
- gross – 12 dozens (144)

== See also ==
- Historical weights and measures
- SI
- Weights and measures
