= Farsang =

Farsang may refer to:

- Parasang, an Iranian or Persian (which also includes Iraq) unit of measurement for how far a man can walk in a day "Stone to stone".
- Metric farsang, a modern Iranian metric unit of measurement, set as 10,000 metres (33,000 ft), equivalent to the modern Scandinavian mile and obsolete metric myriametre.
- An Islamic folk character
- hu:Farsang, a Hungarian carnival similar to Fastelavn and Mardi Gras.
