= Barrel of land =

Scandinavian unit of area

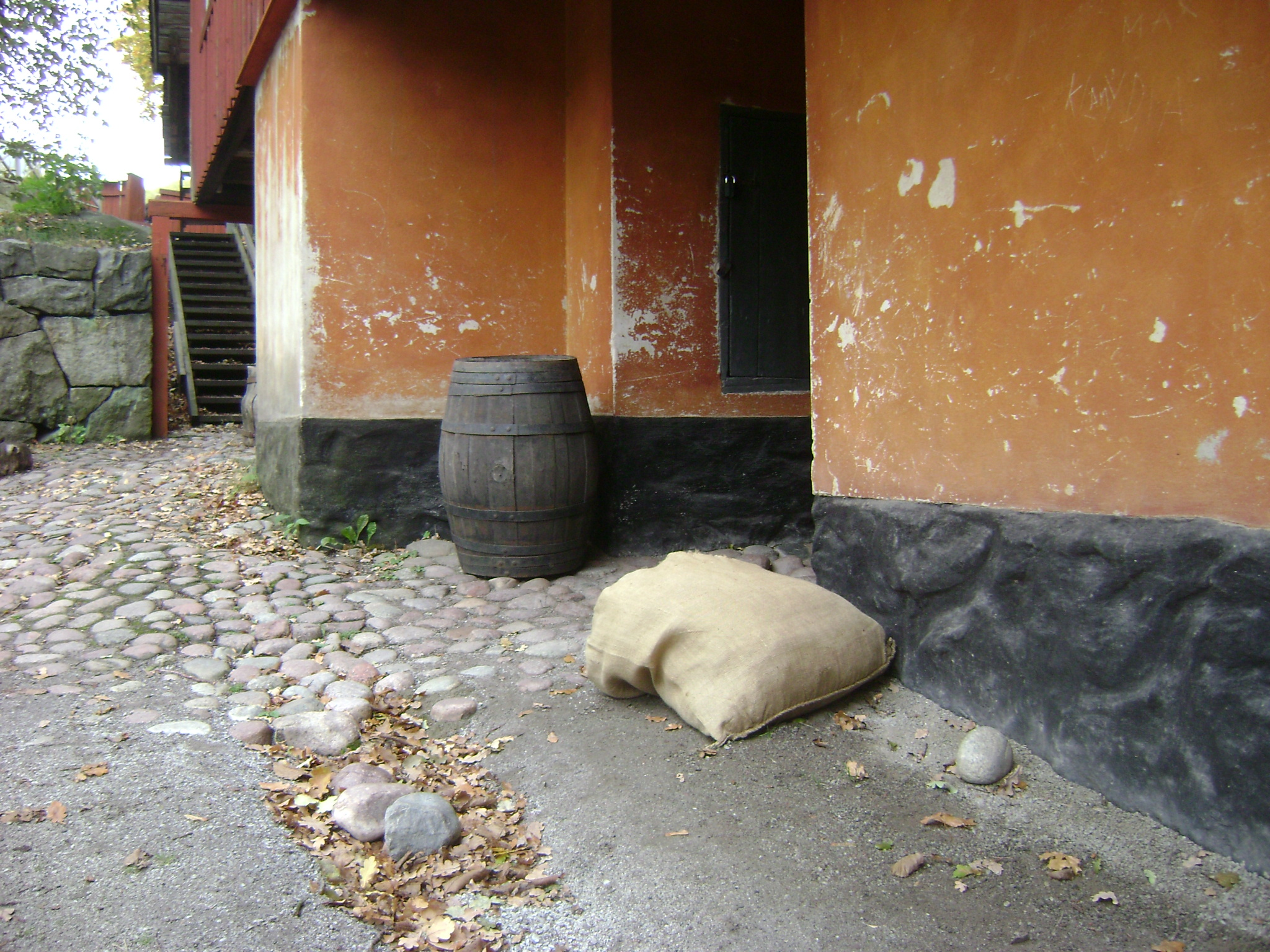
A barrel in a Swedish museum.

A barrel of land (Danish: tønde land, Norwegian: tønneland, Swedish: tunnland, Finnish: tynnyrinala) is a Scandinavian unit of area. The word may originate from the area of fields one could seed with a barrel of grain seeds. The acre is the equivalent Anglo-Saxon unit. Because the barrel sizes varied by country, the area unit does too. One barrel can be approximated as half a hectare.

== Per country ==
=== Denmark ===
In Denmark, the tønde was used as an official area unit until the introduction of the metric system in 1907. A tønde was divided in 8 skæpper, a skæppe was divided into 4 fjerdingkar, and a fjerdingkar into 3 album.

=== Norway ===
A tønneland was divided in 4 mål. Nowadays, a mål corresponds to 1,000 square meters in everyday speech.

=== Sweden ===
The unit was officially surveyed and standardized in the 1630s, and set to 14,000 Swedish square ells, i.e. 56,000 Swedish square feet. One tunnland was divided into 56 kannland, 32 kappland, 6 skäppland, or 2 lopsland.

=== Finland ===
In Finland, the Swedish units that were officially defined in the 1630s were used, but with Finnish names: one tynnyrinala (tunnland) corresponding to 32 kapanala (kappland) or 2 panninala (lopsland).

== In modern units ==
- Danish tønde land: 5,516.2 square metres (1.3631 acres)
- Norwegian tønneland: 3,939 square metres (0.973 acres)
- Swedish tunnland: 4,936.38 square metres (1.21981 acres)
- Finnish tynnyrinala: 4,936.38 square metres (1.21981 acres)

== See also ==
- Norwegian units of measurement
- Danish units of measurement
- Swedish units of measurement
- Finnish units of measurement
