= Linja =

Linja may refer to:

- a Finnish unit of measurement
- Linja, a Finnish oil recovery ship
- Bandar Lengeh, a city in Iran

== See also ==
- Lynja
