= Köping–Uttersberg–Riddarhyttan Railway =

Narrow-gauge railway in Sweden

Coordinates: 59.5064°N 16.0009°E

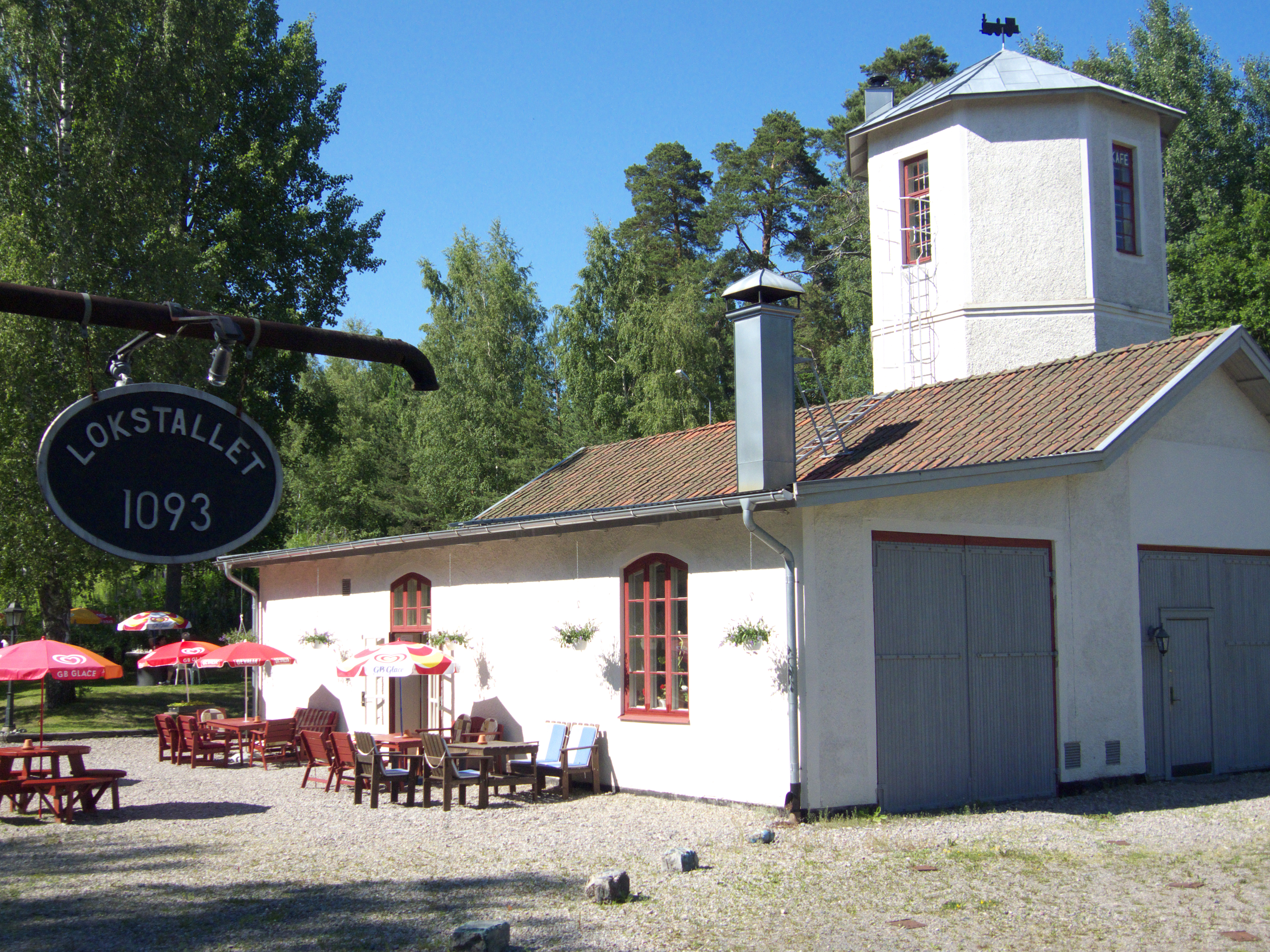
The engine house (Swedish: Lokstallet) in Riddarhyttan in 2009, now a café.

The Köping–Uttersberg–Riddarhyttan Railway (Swedish: Köping-Uttersberg-Riddarhyttans Järnväg or KURJ) was a narrow-gauge railway in central Sweden, 46 kilometres (29 mi) long. The railway ran northwest from the port city of Köping to several small industry cities such as Uttersberg and Riddarhyttan. The line operated between 1864 and 1968.

== Construction ==
=== Gauge incompatibility ===
The railway was built with a gauge of 1,093 mm (3 ft 7 in). The railway was planned to be constructed to a gauge of 1,067 mm (3 ft 6 in), relatively common in Sweden at the time. When the locomotives and rolling stock were ordered, however, there was an error – possibly confusion between the Swedish fot and the English foot, which differ by about 2.7%, or more likely because Köping–Uttersbergs järnvägsaktiebolag assumed the gauge was measured from the centre of the rail to the centre of the rail.

It was only when the rolling stock was delivered that the error was noticed. It was decided that moving one rail outwards on the half-built railway would be cheaper than re-gauging the vehicles.

== Operation ==
Freight traffic started on the part-opened line in 1864, and in 1866, the full 35 kilometres (22 mi) of the Köping-Uttersberg Railway was officially Opened. In 1880 a new 11 kilometres (6.8 mi) line, the Uttersberg-Riddarhyttan Railway was built by another company, but to the same gauge. This was purchased by the Köping-Uttersberg Company in 1911, and the combined railway became the Köping–Uttersberg–Riddarhyttan Railway.

=== Closure ===
Passenger traffic ended in 1952, although a freight service continued until 1968, after which all the track was removed.

== See also ==
- List of Swedish narrow gauges.
