= Greta Naterberg =

Swedish folk singer

Greta Naterberg née Persdotter (June 10, 1772 – May 10, 1818) was a Swedish folk singer.

She was born in Nykil, Östergötland, the daughter of a soldier Per Callerman and Kerstin Lagesdotter and in 1800 she married the soldier Peter Hansson (who later changed his name to Naterberg). She had an extensive repertoire of songs and ballads, which has been documented by Leonhard Fredrik Rääf. She died in Slaka.
