= Scandinavian mile =

Unofficial unit of length

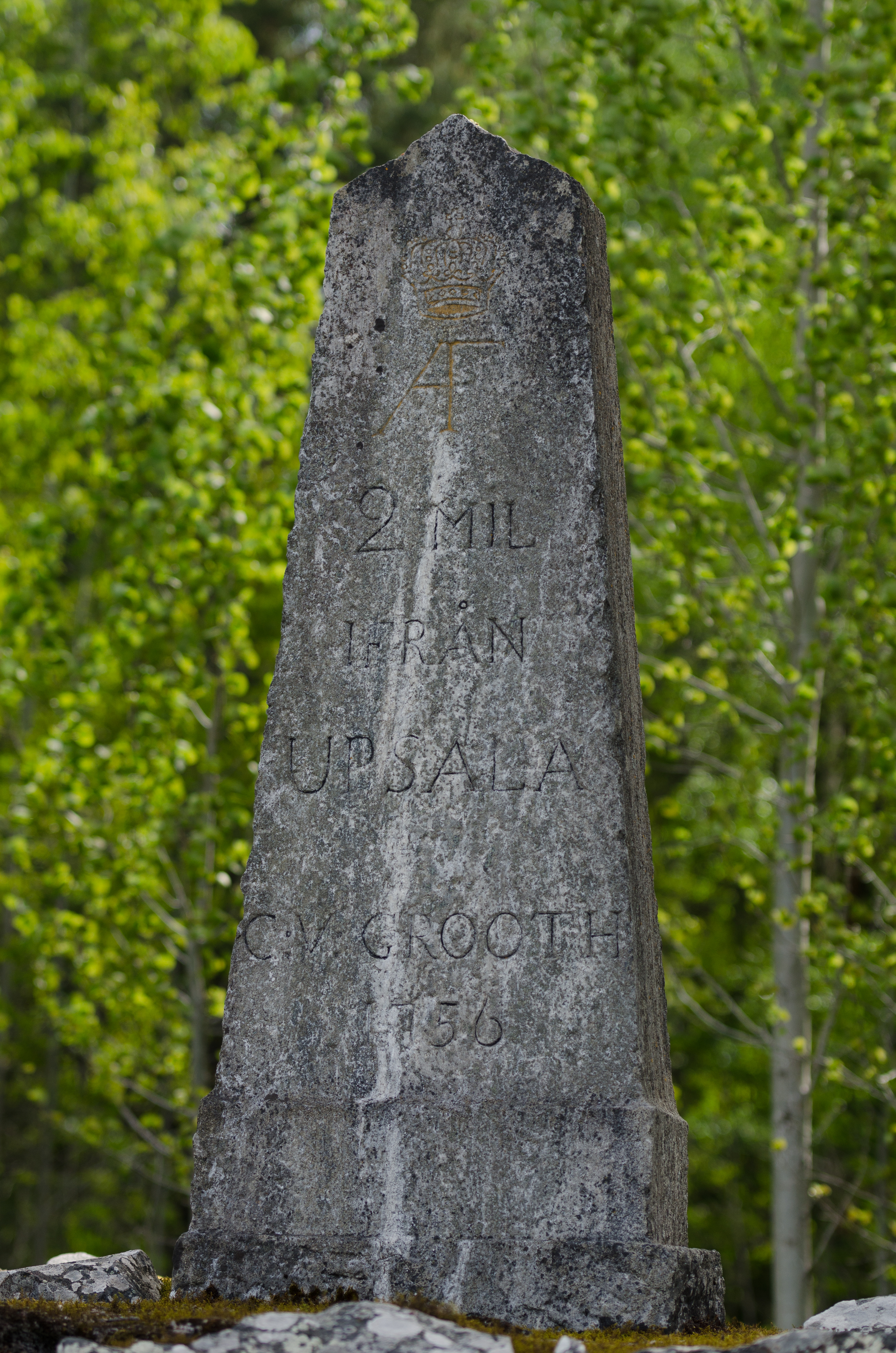
A milestone in Sweden.

A Scandinavian mile (Norwegian and Swedish: mil, [miːl], Finnish: peninkulma) is a unit of length common in Norway and Sweden, and to a lesser extent in Finland. Today, it is standardised as 1 mil being 10 kilometres (6.2 miles), but it had different values in the past.

The word is derived from the same Roman source as the English mile. In Norway and Sweden, the international mile is formally called "English mile" (engelsk mil), although it is sometimes just referred to by the English word mile. However, in situations where confusion may arise it is more common for Scandinavians to describe distances in terms of the official SI unit kilometre.

This modern definition of 10 kilometres (km) is equivalent to the obsolete myriametre, which was once used in France.

== Danish mile ==
The last Danish mile was standardized in 1683 by Ole Rømer to 7,532.4 m (24,713 ft), equivalent to 4 minutes of latitude, and was also used in Prussia, see German miles. Before that each region had its own lengths. For instance the Zealand mile was 17,600 alen or 11.13 km.

== Swedish mile ==
=== County miles ===
In early history, Sweden had various regional miles with their own measurements. Later on, such miles were generally defined by county (Swedish: landskapsmil, "county miles"). Some noteworthy county miles are:

- Dala mile – 14,485 m (9.00 mi)
- Finnish mile (peninkulma) – around 6 km (3.73 mi)
- Småland mile – around 7 km (4.35 mi)
- Uppland mile – 10,688.54 m (6.64 mi) = 3,600 Swedish rods = 6,000 Swedish fathoms = 18,000 Swedish ells = 36,000 Swedish feet
- Västgöta mile – around 13 km (8.08 mi)
- Ångermanland mile – 11,875 m (7.38 mi) = 6,666 Swedish fathoms

=== Unit mile ===
In 1649 the Swedish government made the Uppland mile the de facto Swedish mile, or "unit mile" (enhetsmil), for all of Sweden, also known as "land mile" or "long mile". It could be divided into four "quarter ways" (fjärdingsväg, "firkin way"), describing a quarter of a unit mile.

Old regional miles still persisted across Sweden in the 18th century and regional variations of rod, fathom, ell and foot also caused regional variation to the unit mile. This became apparent with the Swedish-Norwegian union in 1814, were the different definitions of foot made the unit mile 11,295 m (37,057 ft) in Norway.

=== Metric mile ===
When the metric system was introduced, the mil was redefined to be exactly 10 km (6.2 mi). The metric system was introduced in Norway in 1875 and Sweden in 1889, after a decision by the parliament in 1876 and a ten-year transition period from 1879.

When the Russian Empire introduced the metric system in 1887, the Grand Duchy of Finland decided to redefine the old Finnish mile peninkulma (Estonian: penikoorem, Võro: pinikuurma), which was based on the Swedish mile, to also be 10 km (6.2 mi). In Finland, however, it has been much less in use than in Sweden and Norway.

== Usage ==
The mil is currently not used on road signs, and kilometre is the standard for most formal written distances. However, it is very common in colloquial speech, including 5 km, which is referred to in Swedish as "half a mil" (en halvmil). The mil has however not lost all formal uses. Various tax deductions, for example regarding distance travelled for business purposes, are measured in mil by the Swedish Tax Agency (Skatteverket). It is also used in the most common unit for measuring vehicle fuel consumption – "litres per mil" – and in Sweden in second-hand car advertisements, where odometer readings are often quoted in mil though the car itself records kilometres.

=== Metric farsang ===
In Iran and Turkey, an indigenous unit of measurement, equivalent to the Scandinavian mile, is used, known as farsang. Originally a Persian unit of measurement, equivalent to the European league, known as parasang (4.8 or 5.6 km). It was redefined in Iran as 10 kilometres on 31 May 1926.

The older Iranian farsang survives regionally as farsakh-song. In Turkey there is a "light farsang" defined as 5 kilometres (3.1 mi), similar to the Scandinavian forest mile.

== Other Scandinavian miles ==
=== Forest mile ===
Beyond the normal mile, there was also a "forest mile" (skogsmil) that was half as long as the normal mil, i.e. a bit over 5 km (3.1 mi), and equal to an even older unit of measurement, the rast ('rest', 'pause'), so named since it was seen as the distance a man would normally be able to walk between rests, corresponding to the league in other countries.

=== Fell mile ===
There was also a "fell mile" (fjällmil, see fell) which was almost double the normal mile, i.e. just under 20 km (12 mi).

=== Scandinavian nautical mile ===
Before modern times, Scandinavia had its own nautical mile, called "sea mile" (Danish: sømil, Norwegian: sjømil, Swedish: sjömil, also Finnish: meripeninkulma, "sea-peninkulma"). During the 19th and early 20th century, prior to adopting the international nautical mile, this mile was equivalent to a "geographical mile", defined as 1/15 of an equatorial degree (1/360° of longitude), equivalent to approximately four modern nautical miles or "medium meridian minutes" (4 × 1,852 m) – a nautical mile is approximately one sixtieth of a degree along a meridian (1/60 meridian degree). During metrification in 1875, this brought it down to about 7,420 m (24,340 ft) from its former equivalence of 3950 fathoms (Bokmål: favn, Swedish: famn) or about 7,435 m (24,393 ft).

When the international nautical mile was introduced in Norway 1929 the sjømil was then declared a synonym for 1 NM, but informally it has since often been a reference to 4 nmi (7.4 km; 4.6 mi) similar to the former distance. In Sweden, the international nautical mile is often referred to as nautisk mil, were as the older sjömil can refer to either the old and the new in terms of context. In Finnish, meripeninkulma, was redefined as 1 NM.

== In literature ==
Naomi Mitchison, in her autobiographic book You May Well Ask, relates an experience during a walking tour in Sweden: "Over in Gotland I walked again, further than I would have if I had realized that the milestones were in old Swedish miles, so that my disappointing three-mile walk along the cold sea edge under the strange ancient fortifications was really fifteen English miles".

== See also ==
- Danish units of measurement
- Norwegian units of measurement
- Swedish units of measurement
- Metric system
