= Data mile =

- Unit of: length

Conversions
1 data mile in ...	... is equal to ...
- imperial/US units: 6000 ft 1.13636 mi
- SI units: 1.82880 km
- nautical units: 0.98747 nmi

In radar-related subjects and in JTIDS, a data mile is a unit of distance equal to 6,000 feet (1,829 metres; 0.9875 nautical miles; 1.136 miles). An international mile is 0.88 data mile.

The speed of light is 299,792,458 metres per second (983,571,056 ft/s), or about one foot per nanosecond. If it were exactly one foot per nanosecond, and a target was one data mile away, then the radar return from that target would arrive 12 microseconds after the transmission. (Recall that radar was developed during World War II in America and England, while both were using English units. It was convenient for them to relate 1 data mile to 12 microseconds.)

== See also ==
- Radar mile
