= Risten–Lakvik Museum Railway =

Heritage railway in Sweden

Coordinates: 58.30637°N 16.02288°E

The Risten–Lakvik Museum Railway (Swedish: Risten-Lakviks Järnväg) is a 600 mm (1 ft 11 5/8 in) narrow-gauge heritage railway located in southern Östergötland, between Norrköping and Åtvidaberg in Sweden.

Centred on Lakvik, and utilising part of the former trackbed of the Norsholm–Västervik–Hultsfred Railway (NVHJ), the line runs north to Backasand, and south to a junction at Rosenhall, with a branch line Risten. The main line continues towards Pälstorp, although not yet reaching as far. The ultimate aim is to reach as far as Torphängen.

== The original line ==
Construction of the Swedish three foot (891 mm or 2 ft 11 3/32 in) gauge Norsholm–Bersbo railway began in April 1877, opening to traffic on 20 November 1878. It was part of the NVHJ which was nationalised on 1 July 1949. The line closed and the track was cleared about 1964.

In Spring 1965 a group of rail enthusiasts announced plans for a 600 mm (1 ft 11 5/8 in) gauge private railway in forest land at Nykil. Ground was broken on 1 June, and construction of the Oxkullens Local Railway (OLJ) started. In the spring of 1969, the first freight wagons were purchased.

It was soon realised that the site of the OLJ was too small. Several members suggested buying the redundant trackbed at Lakvik, which would give the group much more room to operate a realistic railway.

Following approval by the Swedish State Railways on 20 August 1971, the purchase was completed on 22 February 1972.

The "Museum Association Risten–Lakvik Railway" started in 1971. Work began moving equipment to Lakvik to re-lay railway tracks on NVHJ's old embankment and station area. Track construction also began between Lakvik and Backasand.

== Creating the museum railway ==
=== 1970s–1980s ===
Three locomotives were acquired in 1973:

- Gmeinder works No.4344 of 1948 is a diesel-hydraulic loco, and the largest 600 mm gauge diesel on Swedish rails. Named "Aspa Bruk" after its previous location, it carries the number RKJ 4.
- Steam Locomotive Jung works No. 3698 of 1925 became RLJ 2 "Lakvik", later renamed "A. Dahl"
- The third, a pneumatic locomotive, came from Långbans mines in Värmland.

In 1974, the fleet was expanded with Ljunggrens Work No. 37 of 1919, becoming RLJ 1 "Risten". This is the only remaining 600 mm gauge steam locomotive manufactured by Ljunggrens. In the same year reconstruction of the carriage shed was completed, providing covered rolling stock storage, and scheduled trains ran for the first time on 7 August 1976.

In 1982 "Summer Dipper" was introduced to traffic. This carriage could carry more passengers than the small carts previously used for passenger transportation.

The former station building at Lakvik was privately owned, so a replacement was needed. This was found in the form of the similar station building from Bersbo and in 1987 the building was taken apart and moved to its new site.

=== 1990s ===
In 1994, the level crossing at Lakvik was completed, so track could be extended southwards. In 1997, the former Åtvidaberg goods shed was obtained and moved to a new location at Lakvik. Steam traffic started in 1999.

=== 2000s ===
In Summer 2002, work started on the main track extension through the station area, towards the planned station at Risten. By November 2003 the Risten station building was in place, and renovation started. In spring 2005 preparation started for the lake track continuation towards Risten. In Summer 2005, the extension of the carriage shed took off in earnest. By 2007, the roof was complete. During 2008 and 2009 the electrical installations were restored.

=== 2010s ===
Tracklaying towards Risten station resumed in 2008 and continued until the yard was completed. In June 2011, construction of the track until station building and in July ranged main track past the station building.

On Saturday 13 August 2011 the museum reached a key milestone when the first train arrived at Risten station. In 2011 started to build "magazine tracks", the track which is outside magsinets southern end, the magazine's connection to the main track. In February 2012 steam locomotive "Risten" returned after restoration work. The loco was renamed "K.G. Kindgren".

On 27 June 2012 the last leg of the line to Risten was officially opened by Elisabeth Nilsson, the Östergötland County governor, with a number of other prominent individuals attending. In July 2013 increased passenger numbers required the use of a second summer carriage to supplement the original. In December 2013, the line's third steam locomotive arrived from the Lynton and Barnstaple Railway in Devon, England. the locomotive – Maffei works No. 4127 of 1925 – and became RLJ 3, "Lakvik".

As well as the three steam locomotives, the RLJ has a stable of two diesel-hydraulic and three diesel-mechanical locos.
