= Norwegian Parliament's adoption of the metric system =

The Norwegian Parliament's (Storting's) acceptance of the meter convention is regarded as the quickest decision by the Storting in peacetime.

- Norway signed the metre convention in Paris 20 May 1875.
- Eight days before the convention was ready, the Storting unanimously decided on 12 May 1875 that Norway would join the meter convention.
- The meter convention was ratified by Norwegian royal resolution the 22 May 1875, and the metric system thus went into effective Norwegian law two days after the convention had been concluded.

== Introduction of the SI system in Norway ==
In 1683, Norway was in union with Denmark and standardized on a common measurement system with Denmark, but old Norwegian measurements continued to be used locally in Norway. After the union ended in 1814, the Norwegian professor and director for geographic measurements Christopher Hansteen asserted that it was inconvenient having to travel to Copenhagen in Denmark to calibrate Norwegian measurement standards, and also claimed that the Danish system had some crucial flaws. He succeeded in getting an own Norwegian measurement system approved by Norwegian law in 1824. The unit "foot" (Norwegian fot) was defined as 12/38 of the length a pendulum with a period of 1 second, and a "trade pound" (handelspund) was defined as the weight of 1/62 cubic feet of water.

Norway was in union with Sweden, and the new special Norwegian measurement system was very unpopular with the Swedes, being viewed as an act of stubbornness. The Swedish instead wanted the Norwegians to switch to the Swedish system. Between 1860 and 1863, Hansteen explained in a series of articles in the Norwegian magazine Morgenbladet that he had been pressured by the Swedish Stadtholder and other official Swedish representatives, who complained that the "Norwegians were unwilling to fulfill Swedish requirement" ("Normændenes Uvillie til at opfylde Sveriges Fordringr"). Hansteen instead publicly defended the Norwegian system, saying it was based on natural measurements, claiming that it was better than the Swedish system, and that it would be more natural for Sweden to switch to the Norwegian system. No solution was found; Norway and Sweden mainly produced the same types of products for export, so there was little trade between the two countries. Besides, it was also argued that it would be very costly to change the measurement system so shortly after its introduction. "All in all", Hansteen said, "Norway would lose all the above-mentioned benefits of our system, without Sweden gaining any discernible advantage" ("Alt i alt ville Norge tabe alle de ovenom talte Fordele ved vort System, uden at Sverige herved vandt nogen mærkelig fordeel").

In 1873, Norwegian politician Ole Jacob Broch entered the measurement system debate by becoming the leader of a commission which was to evaluate the introduction of the metric system in Norway. Broch was educated as a mathematician, and was working as a politician both in his municipality and as a state council at the Storting. Late in his life he had become engaged in debates about weights and measures. His commission asserted that the Norwegian measurement system was antiquated, and that a material standard (using prototypes) would give a much greater precision than the pendulum standard. Additionally, the decimal based meter system was so simple that it could be learned in a few minutes, as opposed to the Norwegian system. However, the conclusion of the commission met resistance, since "as with any sudden change in something that has existed for a long time, change results in confusion, and therefore stubborn resistance among the crowd" ("da det som enhver pludselig Forandring i det Bestaaende i lang Tid frembrin ge Forvirring og derfor møde haardnakket Modstand blant Mængden").

There was also fierce opposition in other countries towards the metric system, both in regards to its introduction, but also towards the principle on international collaboration to manage it. From when Broch met as the Norwegian representative on an international conference in 1872, he played a key part by becoming a bridge builder on the issue internationally by using his academic expertise, energy and diplomatic skills. The French had insisted on introducing the metric system under their control, but other countries wanted an international organisation to manage it. As a compromise, an international committee of 12 members was set up, with Broch being one of the members. This was seen as a de facto recognition of Norway as an independent nation, who were in union with Sweden at the time. By Broch's strategy and thorough work, the international committee achieved the "meter convention" in 1875. Here it was decided that an international institute would be set up to be responsible for the meter system, and for keeping prototypes for length and weight. Representatives from 17 countries signed the convention. Sweden was long opposed, and Denmark had little interest, but both countries eventually signed. Broch avoided Nordic coordination on the matter, which could only harm Norway's views.

== A "coup" ==
At the same time, Broch worked with two issues nationally:

- Introduction of the metric system in Norwegian law.
- Norwegian membership in the meter convention.

His national committee presented a bill on the transition to the meter system, which was passed on 22 May 1875. Already in 1873 he had the Norwegian government accept an international measurement institute "in principle", and in the spring of 1875 he made sure that the necessary decisions were made in a "unprecedented haste". The Conference on the Meter Convention started on 1 March, and on 15 April Broch sent a preliminary announcement to the Norwegian government from Paris. The Norwegian Cabinet was able to have a recommendation ready on 27 April, and the royal council order was ready on 5 May. Broch sent a report on the outcome of the conference on 5 May, despite the fact that the convention was not signed until 20 May. Norwegian participation in the meter convention was ratified, and financial contribution to the establishment and operation of an international measuring institute was granted by the Storting on 26 May. Norway was the first country to ratify the treaty, and this is probably the fastest treatment ever done in the Norwegian parliament in peacetime. Swedish objections first reached 17 June and did not matter. Sweden ratified the meter convention three years later, and Denmark 32 years later in 1907.

== Continued importance of the meter convention in Norway ==
The development of the units of measurement and the introduction of the meter convention gave Norway the opportunity to demonstrate its independence. In 1879 Broch gained the recognition of becoming the third director of the International Bureau of Weights and Measures (BIPM), serving until 1888. Later, the metric system has been expanded, and is known today as the SI system. Through scientific innovations, the whole SI system has been fully defined based on fixed natural constants since 2019, with the help of the theory of relativity, quantum mechanics and atomic physical phenomena. SI units can be realized in universal experiments that can be performed in national laboratories, so that new measurement prototypes can be realized. International trade, environmental agreements and research are based on confidence in measurements, the SI system and cooperation in the meter convention. Justervesenet is Norway's representative in the international measurement technology community, and are regularly required to demonstrate their expertise in the national laboratory of measurements.

== See also ==
- Norwegian units of measurement
- Scandinavian mile
