= Mile =

Unit of length

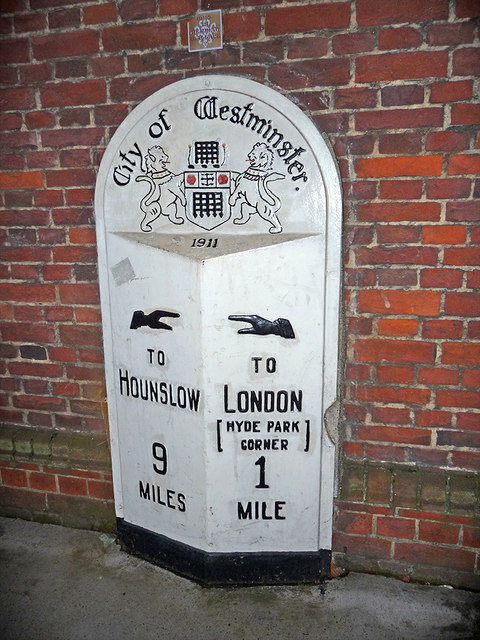
- A milestone in the City of Westminster showing the distance from Kensington Road to Hounslow and Hyde Park Corner in miles

General information
- Unit system: British imperial/US customary
- Unit of: length
- Symbol: mi. or mi, (rarely) m

Conversions
1 mi. or mi in ...	... is equal to ...
- SI units: 1609.344 m
- imperial/US units: 63360 in; 5280 ft; 1760 yd; 80 ch; 8 fur
- US survey mile: 0.999998 survey mile
- nautical units: ≈ 0.86898 nmi (Note: Exactly 50292/57875 nmi)

The mile, sometimes the international mile or statute mile to distinguish it from other miles, is a British imperial unit and United States customary unit of length; both are based on the older English unit of length equal to 5,280 English feet, or 1,760 yards. The statute mile was standardised as a unit of length between the Commonwealth of Nations and the United States by an international agreement in 1959, when the yard was formally redefined with respect to SI units as 0.9144 metres, making the mile exactly 1609.344 metres (1.609344 kilometres). For everyday use, five miles equates roughly to eight kilometres. Mileage is the term used informally for a distance expressed in miles.

With qualifiers, mile is also used to describe or translate a wide range of units derived from or roughly equivalent to the Roman mile (roughly 1.48 km), such as the nautical mile (now 1.852 km exactly), the Italian mile (roughly 1.852 km), and the Chinese mile (now 500 m exactly). The Romans divided their mile into 5,000 pedes (lit. 'feet'), but the greater importance of furlongs in the Elizabethan-era England meant that the statute mile was made equivalent to 8 furlongs or 5,280 feet in 1593. This form of the mile then spread across the British Empire, some successor states of which continue to employ the mile. The US Geological Survey now employs the metre for official purposes, but legacy data from its 1927 geodetic datum has meant that a separate US survey mile (6336/3937 km) continues to see some use, although it was officially phased out in 2022. While most countries replaced the mile with the kilometre when switching to the International System of Units (SI), the international mile continues to be used in some countries, such as the United Kingdom, the United States, and a number of countries with fewer than one million inhabitants, most of which are UK or US territories or have close historical ties with the UK or US.

== Name ==
The modern English word mile derives from Middle English myle and Old English mīl, which was cognate with all other Germanic terms for miles. These derived from the nominal ellipsis form of mīlle passus 'mile' or mīlia passuum 'miles', the Roman mile of one thousand paces.

The present international mile is usually what is understood by the unqualified term mile. When this distance needs to be distinguished from the nautical mile, the international mile may also be described as a land mile or statute mile. In British English, statute mile may refer to the present international mile or to any other form of English mile since an act of Parliament, the Restriction on Building Act 1592 (35 Eliz. 1. c. 6) was passed in 1593, which set it as a distance of 1,760 yards. Under American law, however, statute mile refers to the US survey mile. Foreign and historical units translated into English as miles usually employ a qualifier to describe the kind of mile being used but this may be omitted if it is obvious from the context, such as a discussion of the 2nd-century Antonine Itinerary describing its distances in terms of miles rather than Roman miles.

=== Abbreviation ===
The mile has been variously abbreviated in English—with and without a trailing period—as "mi", "M", "ml", and "m". The American National Institute of Standards and Technology now uses and recommends "mi" to avoid confusion with the SI metre (m) and millilitre (ml). However, derived units such as miles per hour or miles per gallon continue to be abbreviated as an initialism as in "mph" and "mpg", rather than "mi/h" and "mi/gal". In the United Kingdom, road signs use "m" as the abbreviation for mile though height and width restrictions also use "m" as the symbol for the metre, which may be displayed alongside feet and inches. The BBC style holds that "there is no acceptable abbreviation for 'miles'" and so it should be spelt out in all cases.

== Historical ==
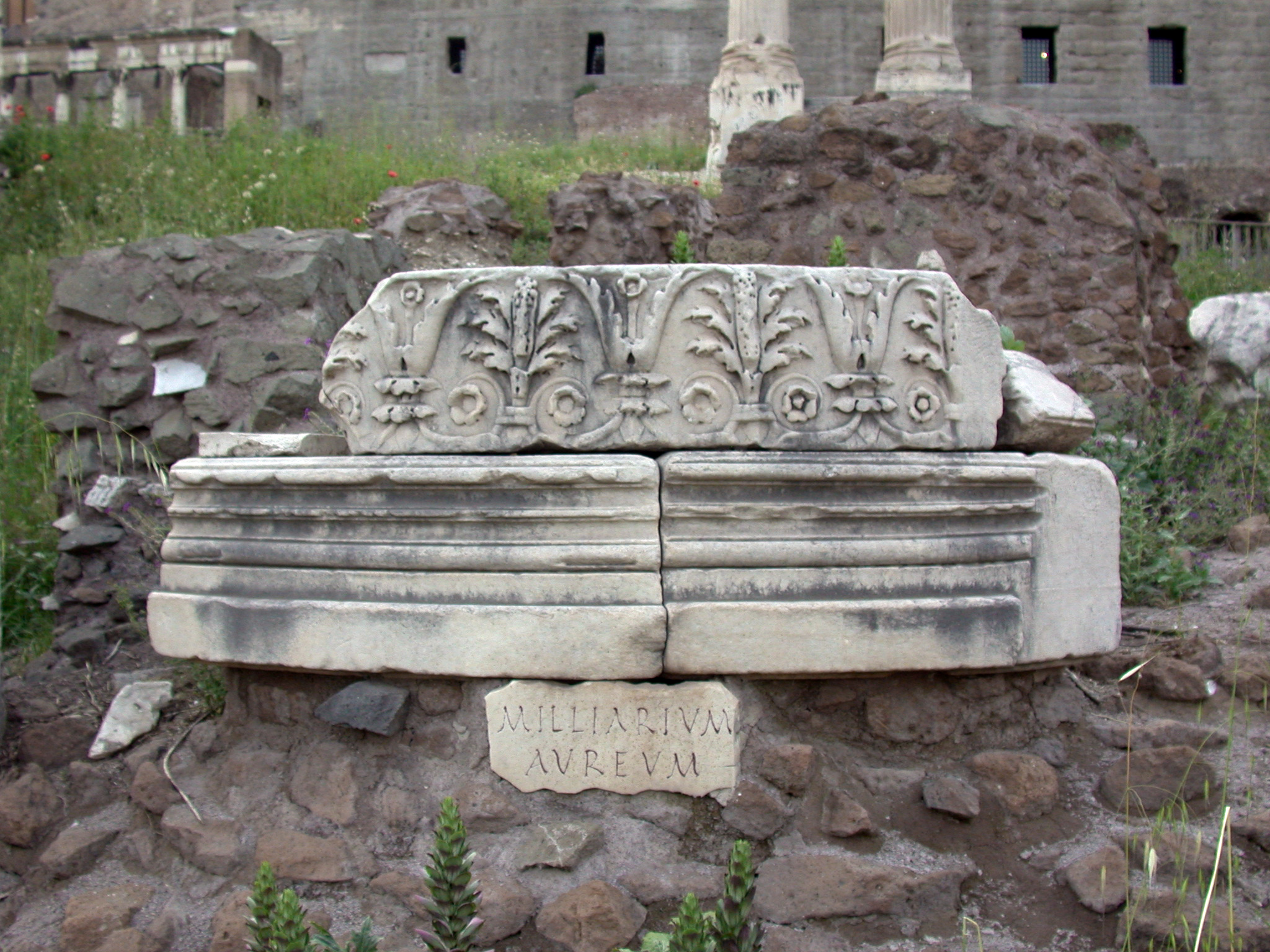
The supposed remains of the Golden Milestone, the zero-mile marker of the Roman road network, in the Roman Forum

=== Roman ===
The Roman mile (mille passus, lit. "thousand paces"; abbr. m.p.; also milia passuum (Note: A partitive genitive construction literally meaning "one thousand of paces".) and mille) consisted of a thousand paces as measured by every other step—as in the total distance of the left foot hitting the ground 1,000 times. The distance was indirectly standardised by Agrippa's establishment of a standard Roman foot in 29 BC, and the definition of a pace as 5 (Roman) feet. An Imperial Roman mile thus denoted 5,000 Roman feet. Surveyors and specialised equipment such as the decempeda and dioptra then spread its use.

In modern times, Agrippa's Imperial Roman mile was empirically estimated to have been about 1,479 metres (4,854 ft; 0.919 miles) in length, slightly less than the 1,610 metres (5,280 ft) of the modern international mile.

In Hellenic areas of the Empire, the Roman mile (Ancient Greek: μίλιον, mílion) was used beside the native Greek units as equivalent to 8 stadia of 600 Greek feet. The mílion continued to be used as a Byzantine unit and was also used as the name of the zero mile marker for the Byzantine Empire, the Milion, located at the head of the Mese near Hagia Sophia.

The Roman mile spread throughout Europe, with its local variations giving rise to the different size units. Also arising from the Roman mile is the milestone. All roads radiated out from the Roman Forum throughout the Empire – 50,000 (Roman) miles of stone-paved roads. At every mile was placed a shaped stone. Originally, these were obelisks made from granite, marble, or whatever local stone was available. On these was carved a Roman numeral, indicating the number of miles from the centre of Rome – the Forum. Hence, one can know how far one is from Rome.

==== Ptolemaic mile ====
In the 2nd-century, Greco-Roman polymath, Claudius Ptolemy, of Alexandria (Egypt), in his Almagest and Geography, defined a mile as a geographic arcminute of longitude, of the earth's circumference, equivalent to 1:60 of a degree of longitude, or 1:21,600 of the circumference. While his estimate of the circumference of the earth, and therefore the derived length of a stade, and a mile, from third party observations, principally offered in non-normalised stadion (600 Greek feet), Egyptian schoinos, and Persian parasang were erroneous. Ptolemy's assumptions of a customary stade to be 1/8 of a Roman mile, 1/30 of a schoinos or parasang, 1/500 of an arc-minute, or ~185 metres, his Geographical mile, is the basis of the current nautical mile, and was adopted by medieval Arab and European cartographers.

=== Arabic ===
The Arabic mile (الميل, al-mīl), of 4,000 cubits, was not the common Arabic unit of length; instead, Arabs and Persians traditionally used the longer parasang or "Arabic league". Although the precise length of the Arabic mile remains disputed, due to the variability in cubit length, it was somewhere between 1.8 and 2.0 km; it is approximate to a 1.852 km nautical or geographical mile, and an approximation of 1 arcminute of latitude measured directly north-and-south along a meridian. The mile was used by medieval Arab geographers and scientists.

=== Breslau ===
The Breslau mile, used in Breslau, and from 1630 officially in all of Silesia, is equal to 11,250 ells, or about 6,700 meters. The mile equaled the distance from the Piaskowa Gate all the way to Psie Pole (Hundsfeld). By rolling a circle with a radius of 5 ells through Piaskowa Island, Ostrów Tumski and suburban tracts, passing eight bridges on the way, the standard Breslau mile was determined.

=== Croatian ===
The Croatian mile (hrvatska milja), first devised by the Jesuit Stjepan Glavač on a 1673 map, is the length of an arc of the equator subtended by 1/10° or 11.13 km exactly. The previous Croatian mile, now known as the "ban mile" (banska milja), had been the Austrian mile given above.

=== Danish ===
Following its standardisation by Ole Rømer in the late 17th century, the Danish mile (mil) was precisely equal to the Prussian mile and likewise divided into 24,000 feet. These were sometimes treated as equivalent to 7.5 km. Earlier values had varied: the Sjællandske miil, for instance, had been 11.13 km.

=== Dutch ===
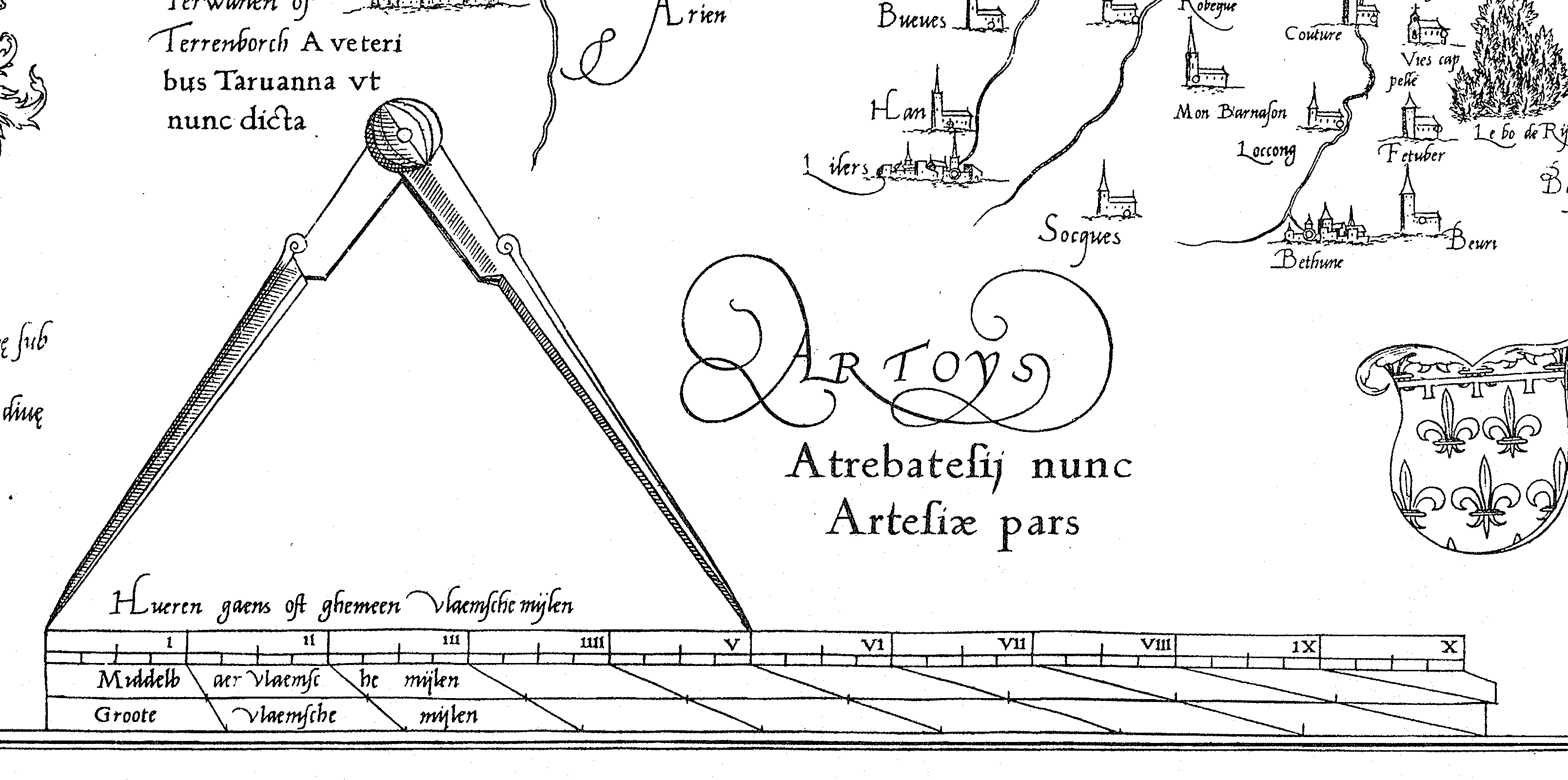
Scalebar on a 16th-century map made by Mercator. The scalebar is expressed in "Hours walking or common Flemish miles", and includes three actual scales: small, medium and big Flemish miles.

The Dutch mile (mijl) has had different definitions throughout history. One of the older definitions was 5,600 ells. But the length of an ell was not standardised, so that the length of a mile could range between 3,280 m and 4,280 m. In the sixteenth century, the Dutch had three different miles: small (kleine), medium (middelbaar/gemeen), and large (groote). The Dutch kleine mile had the historical definition of one hour's walking (uur gaans), which was defined as 24 stadia, 3000 paces, or 15,000 Amsterdam or Rhineland feet (respectively 4,250 m or 4,710 m). The common Dutch mile was 32 stadia, 4,000 paces, or 20,000 feet (5,660 m or 6,280 m). The large mile was defined as 5000 paces. The common Dutch mile was preferred by mariners, equating with 15 to one degree of latitude or one degree of longitude on the equator. This was originally based upon Ptolemy's underestimate of the Earth's circumference. The ratio of 15 Dutch miles to a degree remained fixed while the length of the mile was changed as with improved calculations of the circumference of the Earth. In 1617, Willebrord Snellius calculated a degree of the circumference of the Earth at 28,500 Rijnlantsche Roeden (within 3.5% of the actual value), which resulted in a Dutch mile of 1900 rods. By the mid-seventeenth century, map scales assigned 2000 rods to the common Dutch mile, which equalled around 7,535 m (reducing the discrepancy with latitude measurement to less than 2%). The metric system was introduced in the Netherlands in 1816, and the metric mile became a synonym for the kilometre, being exactly 1,000 m. Since 1870, the term mijl was replaced by the equivalent kilometer. Today, the word mijl is no longer used, except as part of certain proverbs and compound terms like mijlenver ('miles away').

=== English ===
The "old English mile" of the medieval and early modern periods varied but seems to have measured about 1.3 international miles (2.1 km). The old English mile varied over time and location within England. The old English mile has also been defined as 79,200 or 79,320 inches (1.25 or 1.2519 statute miles). The English long continued the Roman computations of the mile as 5,000 feet, 1,000 paces, or 8 longer divisions, which they equated with their "furrow's length" or furlong.

The origins of English units are "extremely vague and uncertain", but seem to have been a combination of the Roman system with native and Germanic systems both derived from multiples of the barleycorn. (Note: The c. 1300 Composition of Yards and Perches, a statute of uncertain date usually reckoned as an enactment of Edward I or II, notionally continued to derive English units from three barleycorns "dry and round" to the inch and this statute remained in force until the 1824 Weights and Measures Act establishing the Imperial system. In practice, official measures were verified using the standards at the Exchequer or simply ignored.) Probably by the reign of Edgar in the 10th century, the nominal prototype physical standard of English length was an arm-length iron bar (a yardstick) held by the king at Winchester; the foot was then one-third of its length. Henry I was said to have made a new standard in 1101 based on his own arm. Following the issuance of Magna Carta in 1215, the barons of Parliament directed John and his son to keep the king's standard measure (Mensura Domini Regis) and weight at the Exchequer, which thereafter verified local standards until its abolition in the 19th century. New brass standards are known to have been constructed under Henry VII and Elizabeth I.

Arnold's c. 1500 Customs of London recorded a mile shorter than previous ones, coming to 0.947 international miles (5,000 feet) or 1.524 km.

==== English statute ====
The English statute mile was established by a Weights and Measures Act of Parliament in 1593 during the reign of Queen Elizabeth I. The act on the Composition of Yards and Perches had shortened the length of the foot and its associated measures, causing the two methods of determining the mile to diverge. Owing to the importance of the surveyor's rod in deeds and surveying undertaken under Henry VIII, decreasing the length of the rod by 1/11 would have amounted to a significant tax increase. Parliament instead opted to maintain the mile of 8 furlongs (which were derived from the rod) and to increase the number of feet per mile from the old Roman value. The applicable passage of the statute reads: "A Mile shall contain eight Furlongs, every Furlong forty Poles, (Note: "Pole" being another name for the rod.) and every Pole shall contain sixteen Foot and an half." (Note: Act 35 Eliz. I cap. 6, s. 8.) The statute mile therefore contained 5,280 feet or 1,760 yards. The distance was not uniformly adopted. Robert Morden had multiple scales on his 17th-century maps which included continuing local values: his map of Hampshire, for example, bore two different "miles" with a ratio of 1 : 1.23 and his map of Dorset had three scales with a ratio of 1 : 1.23 : 1.41. In both cases, the traditional local units remained longer than the statute mile. The English statute mile was superseded in 1959 by the international mile by international agreement.

=== German ===
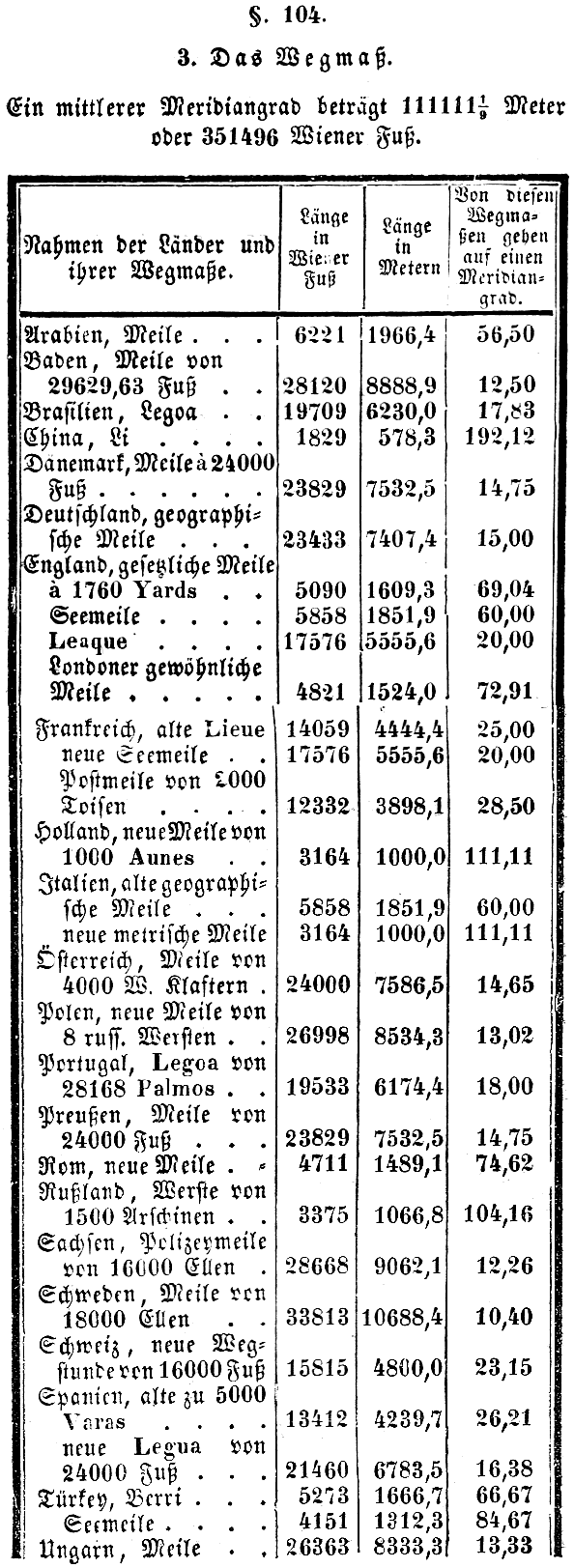
Various historic miles and leagues from an 1848 German textbook, given in feet, metres, and fractions of a "degree of meridian"

The German mile (Meile) was 24,000 German feet. The standardised Austrian mile used in southern Germany and the Austrian Empire was 7.586 km; the Prussian mile used in northern Germany was 7.5325 km. The Germans also used a longer version of the geographical mile.

=== Hungarian ===
The Hungarian mile (mérföld or magyar mérföld) varied from 8.3790 km to 8.9374 km before being standardised as 8.3536 km.

=== Irish ===
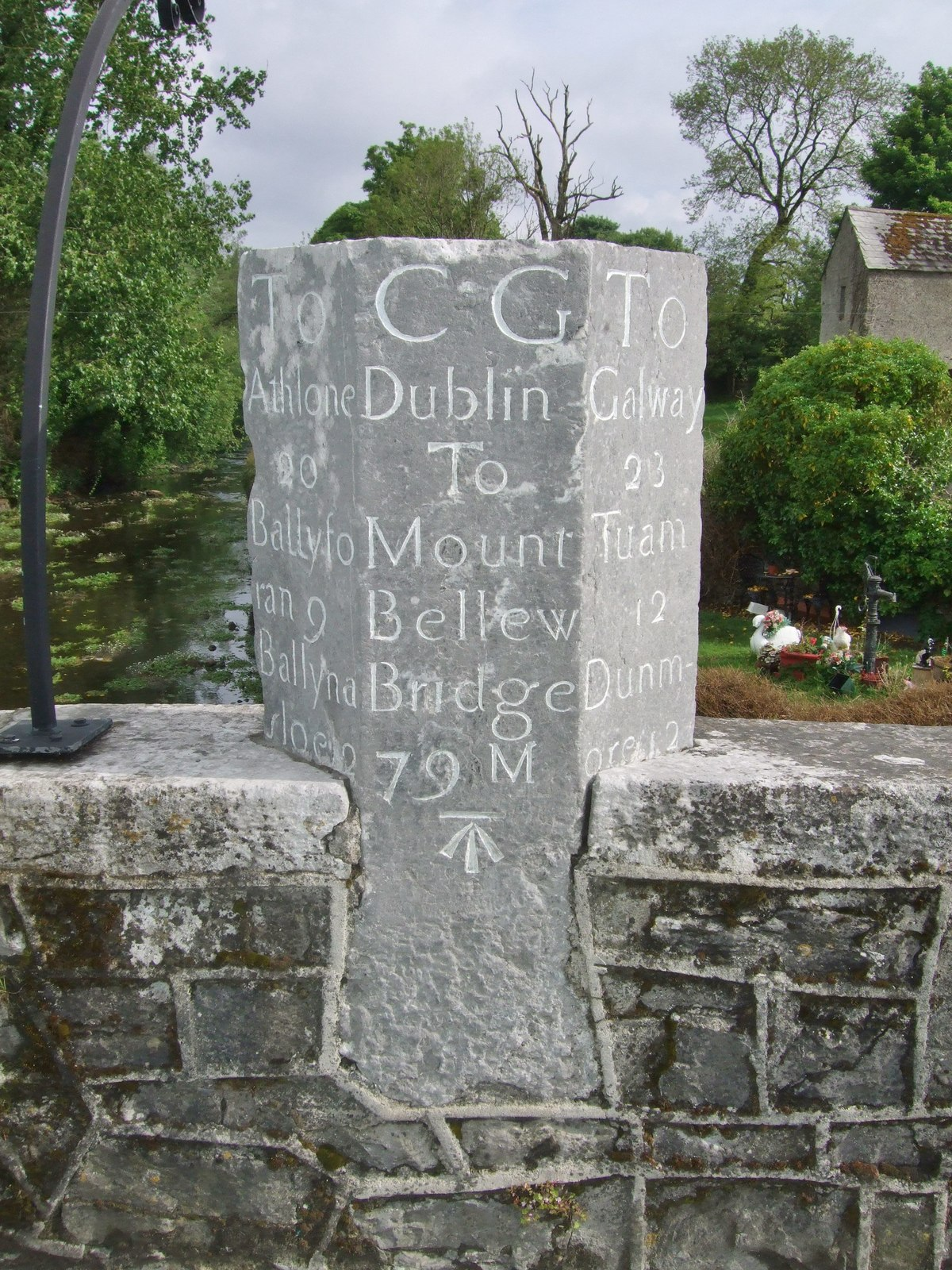
Milestone on Mountbellew Bridge, erected c. 1760. Distances are given in Irish miles.

The Irish mile (míle or míle Gaelach) measured 2,240 yards: approximately 1.27 statute miles or 2.048 kilometres. It was used in Ireland from the 16th century plantations until the 19th century, with residual use into the 20th century. The units were based on "English measure" but used a linear perch measuring 7 yards (6.4 m) as opposed to the English rod of 5.5 yards (5.0 m).

=== Italian ===
The Italian mile (miglio, pl. miglia) was traditionally considered a direct continuation of the Roman mile, equal to 1000 paces, although its actual value over time or between regions could vary greatly. It was often used in international contexts from the Middle Ages into the 17th century and is thus also known as the "geographical mile", although the geographical mile is now a separate standard unit.

=== Japanese ===
The CJK Compatibility Unicode block contains square-format versions of Japanese names for measurement units as written in katakana script. Among them, there is U+3344 ㍄ SQUARE MAIRU, after マイル mairu.

=== Ottoman ===
The Ottoman mile was 1,894.35 m, which was equal to 5,000 Ottoman foot. After 1933, the Ottoman mile was replaced with the modern Turkish mile (1,853.181 m).

=== Portuguese ===
The Portuguese mile (milha) used in Portugal and Brazil was 2.0873 km prior to metrication.

=== Russian ===
The Russian mile (миля or русская миля, russkaya milya) was 7.468 km, divided into 7 versts.

=== Saxon ===
The Saxon post mile (kursächsische Postmeile or Polizeimeile, introduced on occasion of a survey of the Saxon roads in the 1700s, corresponded to 2,000 Dresden rods, equivalent to 9.062 kilometres.

=== Old Scandinavian ===
The old Scandinavian miles (Norse: mil, [miːl], Finnish: peninkulma) were a number of measurements of length used in Scandinavia prior to the adoption of the modern "Scandinavian metric mile" (10 km) in the late 19th century.

Before the Renaissance, there were various regional miles in Scandinavia. In Sweden, the regional miles were eventually divided after province, so called landskapsmil (roughly "county miles"). Some noteworthy Swedish county miles are:

- Dala mile – 14,485 m (9.00 miles)
- Finnish mile (peninkulma) – around 6 km (3.73 miles)
- Småland mile – around 7 km (4.35 miles)
- Uppland mile – 10,688.54 m (6.64 miles) = 3,600 Swedish rods = 6,000 Swedish fathoms = 18,000 Swedish ells = 36,000 Swedish feet
- Västgöta mile – around 13 km (8.08 miles)
- Ångermanland mile – 11,875 m (7.38 miles) = 6,666 Swedish fathoms

While Denmark eventually adopted the Prussian mile (see § Danish mile), the Swedish kept their indigenous miles. In 1649 the Swedish government made the Uppland mile the de facto Swedish mile, or "unit mile" (enhetsmil), for all of Sweden, also called the "land mile" or "long mile". In Finland, then part of Sweden, their measurement peninkulma (which is translated as "mile") then became equivalent to the Swedish "unit mile", which later carried over when Finland was ceded to the Russian Empire in 1809. When Norway became part of Sweden in 1814, forming the Union between Sweden and Norway, the Swedish standard for defining a "unit mile", 36,000 feet, was introduced to Norway, which, due to the Norwegian foot being slightly longer than the Swedish foot, then became slightly longer than in Sweden, making the "unit mile" 11.298 kilometres (7.020 miles) in Norway.

Upon metrification, Finland, Norway, and Sweden, decided to redefine their miles as 10 kilometres (6.2 miles), since they were all based on the old Swedish "unit mile", already close to the measurement. The modern Scandinavian (metric) mile is still a unit of length common in Norway and Sweden, to a lesser extent in Finland, but not Denmark.

The Scandinavians also had their own "nautical mile", called "sea mile" (Danish: sømil, Norwegian: sjømil, Swedish: sjömil), or the equivalent "sea-peninkulma" in Finnish (Finnish: meripeninkulma), equivalent to the German geographical mile (1/15 degrees of latitude), around 7,413 m (24,321 ft); later, during metrification, standardized as 7,420 m (24,340 ft).

=== Scots ===
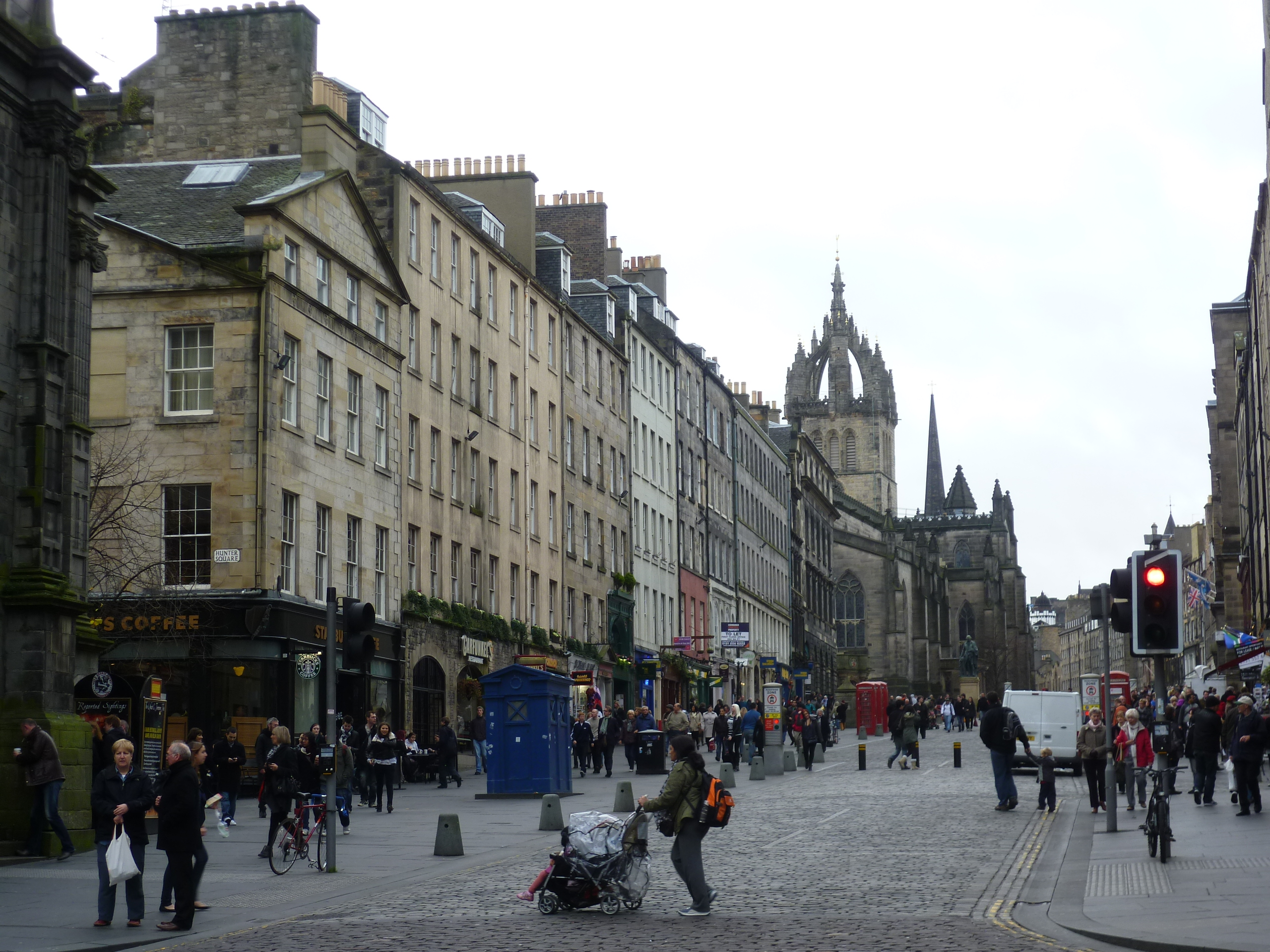
Edinburgh's "Royal Mile"—running from the castle to Holyrood Abbey—is roughly a Scots mile long.

The Scots mile was longer than the English mile, as mentioned by Robert Burns in the first verse of his poem "Tam o' Shanter". It comprised 8 (Scots) furlongs divided into 320 falls or faws (Scots rods). It varied from place to place but the most accepted equivalencies are 1,976 Imperial yards (1.123 statute miles or 1.81 km). It was legally abolished three times: first by a 1685 act of the Scottish Parliament, again by the 1707 Treaty of Union with England, and finally by the Weights and Measures Act 1824. It had continued in use as a customary unit through the 18th century but had become obsolete by its final abolition.

=== Welsh ===
The Welsh mile (milltir or milldir) was 3 statute miles and 1,470 yards long (6.17 km). It comprised 9,000 paces (cam), each of 3 Welsh feet (troedfedd) of 9 inches (modfeddi). (The Welsh inch is usually reckoned as equivalent to the English inch.) Along with other Welsh units, it was said to have been codified under Dyfnwal the Bald and Silent and retained unchanged by Hywel the Good. Along with other Welsh units, it was discontinued following the conquest of Wales by Edward I of England in the 13th century.

=== Computed ===
Some 18th century works refer to distances in Great Britain in "computed miles" (or "c.m.", not to be confused with centimetre). These were distances estimated—somewhat inaccurately—by the early General Post Office, for the calculation of mail charges, and often use figures lower than distances in statute miles (or "measured miles") by around ten per cent in the south of England, and over thirty per cent in northern England and Scotland. For example, a 1778 work refers to "Birmingham... 88 c.m. and 109 miles from London".

== International ==
The international mile is precisely equal to 1.609344 km (or 25,146/15,625 km as a fraction). (Note: 1,760 yards × 0.9144 m/yard.) It was established as part of the 1959 international yard and pound agreement reached by the United States, the United Kingdom, Canada, Australia, New Zealand, and the Union of South Africa, which resolved small but measurable differences that had arisen from separate physical standards each country had maintained for the yard. As with the earlier statute mile, it continues to comprise 1,760 yards or 5,280 feet.

The difference from the previous standards was 2 ppm, or about 3.2 millimetres (1/8 inch) per mile. The US standard was slightly longer and the old Imperial standards had been slightly shorter than the international mile. When the international mile was introduced in English-speaking countries, the basic geodetic datum in America was the North American Datum of 1927 (NAD27). This had been constructed by triangulation based on the definition of the foot in the Mendenhall Order of 1893, with 1 foot = 1200/3937 (≈0.304800609601) metres and the definition was retained for data derived from NAD27, but renamed the US survey foot to distinguish it from the international foot. (Note: When reading the document it helps to bear in mind that 999,998 = 3,937 × 254.) Thus a survey mile = 1200/3937 × 5280 (≈1609.347218694) metres. An international mile = 1609.344 / (1200/3937 × 5280) (=0.999998) survey miles.

The exact length of the land mile varied slightly among English-speaking countries until the international yard and pound agreement in 1959 established the yard as exactly 0.9144 metres, giving a mile of exactly 1,609.344 metres. The US adopted this international mile for most purposes, but retained the pre-1959 mile for some land-survey data, terming it the U. S. survey mile. In the United States, statute mile normally refers to the survey mile, about 3.219 mm (1/8 inch) longer than the international mile (the international mile is exactly 0.0002% less than the US survey mile).

While many countries abandoned the mile when switching to the metric system, the international mile continues to be used in some countries, such as Liberia, Myanmar, the United Kingdom and the United States. It is also used in a number of territories with fewer than a million inhabitants, most of which are UK or US territories, or have close historical ties with the UK or US: American Samoa, Bahamas, Belize, British Virgin Islands, Cayman Islands, Dominica, Falkland Islands, Grenada, Guam, The N. Mariana Islands, Samoa, St. Lucia, St. Vincent & The Grenadines, St. Helena, St. Kitts & Nevis, the Turks & Caicos Islands, and the US Virgin Islands. The mile is even encountered in Canada, though this is predominantly in rail transport and horse racing, as the roadways have been metricated since 1977. Ireland gradually replaced miles with kilometres, including in speed measurements; the process was completed in 2005.

== US survey ==
The US survey mile is 5,280 US survey feet, or 1,609.347 metres and 0.30480061 metres respectively. Both are very slightly longer than the international mile and international foot. In the United States, the term statute mile formally refers to the survey mile, but for most purposes, the difference of less than 1/8 inch (3.2 mm) between the survey mile and the international mile (1609.344 metres exactly) is insignificant—one international mile is 0.999998 US survey miles—so statute mile can be used for either. But in some cases, such as in the US State Plane Coordinate Systems (SPCSs), which can stretch over hundreds of miles, the accumulated difference can be significant, so the reference is to the US survey mile.

The United States redefined its yard in 1893, and this resulted in US and Imperial measures of distance having very slightly different lengths.

The North American Datum of 1983 (NAD83), which replaced the NAD27, is defined in metres. State Plane Coordinate Systems were then updated, but the National Geodetic Survey left individual states to decide which (if any) definition of the foot they would use. All State Plane Coordinate Systems are defined in metres, and 42 of the 50 states only use the metre-based State Plane Coordinate Systems. However, eight states also have State Plane Coordinate Systems defined in feet, seven of them in US survey feet and one in international feet.

State legislation in the US is important for determining which conversion factor from the metric datum is to be used for land surveying and real estate transactions, even though the difference (2 ppm) is hardly significant, given the precision of normal surveying measurements over short distances (usually much less than a mile). Twenty-four states have legislated that surveying measures be based on the US survey foot, eight have legislated that they be based on the international foot, and eighteen have not specified which conversion factor to use.

SPCS 83 legislation refers to state legislation that has been passed or updated using the newer 1983 NAD data. Most states have done so. Two states, Alaska and Missouri, and two jurisdictions, Guam and Puerto Rico, do not specify which foot to use. Two states, Alabama and Hawaii, and four jurisdictions, Washington, DC, US Virgin Islands, American Samoa and Northern Mariana Islands, do not have SPCS 83 legislation.

In October 2019, US National Geodetic Survey and National Institute of Standards and Technology announced their joint intent to retire the US survey foot and US survey mile, as permitted by their 1959 decision, with effect on 1 January 2023.

== Nautical ==
=== International nautical ===
On the utility of the nautical mile. Each circle shown is a great circle—the analogue of a line in spherical trigonometry—and hence the shortest path connecting two points on the globular surface. Meridians are great circles that pass through the poles.

The nautical mile (historically also (sea mile) was originally defined as one minute of arc along a meridian of the Earth. Navigators use dividers to step off the distance between two points on the navigational chart, then place the open dividers against the minutes-of-latitude scale at the edge of the chart, and read off the distance in nautical miles. The Earth is not perfectly spherical but an oblate spheroid, so the length of a minute of latitude increases by 1% from the equator to the poles, as seen for example in the WGS84 ellipsoid, with 1,843 metres (6,046 ft) at the equator, 1,862 metres (6,108 ft) at the poles and average 1,852 metres (6,076 ft).

Since 1929 the international nautical mile is defined by the First International Extraordinary Hydrographic Conference in Monaco as exactly 1,852 metres (which is 1.151 miles or 6,076.12 feet). In the United States, the nautical mile was defined in the 19th century as 6,080.2 feet (1,853.24 m), whereas in the United Kingdom, the Admiralty nautical mile was defined as 6,080 feet (1,853.18 m) and was about one minute of latitude in the latitudes of the south of the UK. Other nations had different definitions of the nautical mile.

==== Related units ====
The nautical mile per hour is known as the knot. Nautical miles and knots are almost universally used for aeronautical and maritime navigation, because of their relationship with degrees and minutes of latitude and the convenience of using the latitude scale on a map for distance measuring.

The data mile is used in radar-related subjects and is equal to 6,000 feet (1.8288 kilometres). The radar mile is a unit of time (in the same way that the light year is a unit of distance), equal to the time required for a radar pulse to travel a distance of two miles (one mile each way). Thus, the radar statute mile is 10.8 μs and the radar nautical mile is 12.4 μs.

=== Scandinavian nautical ===
Scandinavians used their own version of the "nautical mile" up to the beginning of the 20th century (with continued regional use), indigenously known as a sea mile (Danish: sømil, Norwegian: sjømil, Swedish: sjömil), or the equivalent "sea-peninkulma" in Finnish (Finnish: meripeninkulma). It was equal to a "geographical mile", defined as 1/15 of an equatorial degree (1/360° of longitude), equivalent to approximately four modern nautical miles or "medium meridian minutes" (4 × 1,852 m) – a nautical mile is approximately one sixtieth of a degree along a meridian (1/60 meridian degree).

During metrification in 1875, this brought it down to about 7,420 m (24,340 ft) from its former equivalence of 3950 fathoms (Bokmål: favn, Swedish: famn) or about 7,435 m (24,393 ft).

== Geographical ==
The geographical mile is based upon the length of a meridian of latitude. The German geographical mile (geographische Meile) was previously 1/15° of latitude (7.4127 km), and was used as the basis for the Scandinavian nautical mile.

== Metric ==
The informal term "metric mile" is used in some countries, in sports such as track and field athletics and speed skating, to denote a distance of 1,500 metres (0.932 miles). The 1500 meters is the premier middle distance running event in Olympic sports. In United States high-school competition, the term is sometimes used for a race of 1,600 metres (0.994 miles).

Metric mile has also been used to denote other metric measurements under the name mile, such as the Scandinavian mile (Swedish: metrisk mil), and previously also the kilometre, in Dutch.

=== Scandinavian metric ===
The Scandinavian metric mile (Norwegian and Swedish: mil, [miːl]) refers to the modern Scandinavian mile, used in Norway and Sweden, to a lesser extent in Finland (Finnish: peninkulma), but not in Denmark, which since metrication in the late 19th century is standardized as 10 km. It is used in informal situations and in measurements of fuel consumption, which are often given as litres per mil. In formal situations (such as official road signs) only kilometres are given.

The Scandinavian metric mile is based of the old Swedish "unit mile" (Swedish: enhetsmil), which was standardised as 36,000 Swedish feet or 10.6884 kilometres (6.6415 miles) in 1649; before that, the mile varied by province from about 6–14.485 km (3.728–9.001 mi), also known as "county miles" (Swedish: landskapsmil). In Finland, then part of Sweden, the traditional Finnish measurement peninkulma, or "Finnish mile" (Swedish: finsk mil), became redefined as equivalent to the Swedish "unit mile" Swedish: mil, which was then kept when Finland seceded to Russia in 1809. When Norway became part of Sweden in 1814, forming the Union between Sweden and Norway, the Swedish standard for defining a mile was introduced, which then became slightly longer in Norway than in Sweden, due to the Norwegian foot being slightly longer than the Swedish foot, making the "unit mile" 11.298 kilometres (7.020 miles) in Norway. Upon metrification, each country decided to redefine their mile to 10 kilometres.

== Comparison table ==
A comparison of the different lengths for a "mile", in different countries and at different times in history, is given in the table below. Leagues are also included in this list because, in terms of length, they fall in between the short West European miles and the long North, Central and Eastern European miles.

Length (m)	Name	Country used	From	To	Definition	Remarks
500	lǐ	mainland China	1984	today	1,500 chi	In Chinese, this unit and the imperial mile are written using the same word (里), with a qualifier to distinguish between systems if needed
960–1,152	Talmudic mil	Land of Israel/Canaan		today	2,000 amot (cubits)	Biblical and Talmudic units of measurement
1,480	mille passus, milliarium	Roman Empire				Ancient Roman units of measurement
1,486.6	miglio	Sicily				
1,524	London mile	England				
1,609.3426	(statute) mile	England/UK	1592	1959	1,760 yards	Over the course of time, the length of a yard changed several times and consequently so did the English, and from 1824, the imperial mile. The statute mile was introduced in 1592 during the reign of Queen Elizabeth I
1,609.344	mile	some English speaking countries	1959	today	1,760 yards	On 1 July 1959, the imperial mile was standardized to an exact length in metres. This figure corresponds to 5280 feet at 25.4 millimeters per inch.
1,609.3472	(statute) mile	United States	1893	2022	1,760 yards	From 1959 also called the US Survey Mile. From then, its only utility has been land survey, before it was the standard mile. From 1893, its exact length in metres was: 3600/3937 × 1760
1,807	Scots mile	Scotland		1685	5,920 feet	
1,820		Italy				
1,852	nautical mile	international		today	approx. 1 minute of arc	Measured at a circumference of 40,000 km. Abbreviation: NM, nm
1,852.3	(for comparison)				1 meridian minute	
1,853.181	nautical mile	Turkey				
1,855.4	(for comparison)				1 equatorial minute	Although the NM was defined on the basis of the minute, it varies from the equatorial minute, because at that time the circumference of the equator could only be estimated at 40,000 km.
2,065		Portugal				
2,220	Gallo-Roman league	Gallo-Roman culture			1.5 miles	Under the reign of Emperor Septimius Severus, this replaced the Roman mile as the official unit of distance in the Gallic and Germanic provinces, although there were regional and temporal variations.
2,470		Sardinia, Piemont				
2,622		Scotland				
2,880		Ireland				
3,780		Flanders				
3,898	French lieue (post league)	France			2,000 "body lengths"	
3,927	Ri	Japan			12,960 shaku	
4,000	general or metric league					
4,000	legue	Guatemala				
4,190	legue	Mexico			= 2,500 tresas = 5,000 varas	
4,444.8	landleuge				1/25° of a circle of longitude	
4,452.2	lieue commune	France				Units of measurement in France before the French Revolution
4,513	legue	Paraguay				
4,513	legua	Chile, (Guatemala, Haiti)			= 36 cuadros = 5,400 varas	
4,808		Switzerland				
4,828	English land league	England			3 miles	
4,800; 4,900	Germanic rasta, also doppelleuge (double league)					
5,000	légua nova	Portugal				
5,196	legua	Bolivia			= 40 ladres	
5,152	legua Argentina	Argentina, Buenos Aires			= 6,000 varas	
5,154	legue	Uruguay				
5,200	Bolivian legua	Bolivia				
5,370	legue	Venezuela				
5,500	Portuguese legua	Portugal				
5,510	legue	Ecuador				
5,510	Ecuadorian legua	Ecuador				
5,532.5	Landleuge (state league)	Prussia				Obsolete German units of measurement
5,540	legue	Honduras				
5,556	Seeleuge (nautical league)				1/20° of a circle of longitude 3 nautical miles	
5,570	legua	Spain and Chile				Spanish customary units
5,572	legua	Colombia			= 3 Millas	
5,572.7	legue	Peru			= 20,000 feet	
5,572.7	legua Antigua old league	Spain			= 3 millas = 15,000 feet	
5,590	légua	Brazil			= 5,000 varas = 2,500 bracas	
5,600	Brazilian legua	Brazil				
5,685	Fersah (Turkish league)	Ottoman Empire		1933	4 Turkish miles	Derived from Persian parasang
5,840	Dutch mile	Holland				
6,170	milltir	Wales		13thC	9,000 camau ( = 27,000 troedfeddi = 243,000 inches)	Eclipsed by the conquest of Wales by Edward I
6,197	légua antiga	Portugal			= 3 milhas = 24 estadios	
6,240	Persian legue	Persia				
6,277		Luxembourg				
6,280		Belgium				
6,687.24	legua nueva new league, since 1766	Spain			= 8,000 varas	
6,700	Breslau mile	Silesia	1630	1872		Also known as mila wrocławska in Polish
6,797	Landvermessermeile (state survey mile)	Saxony				Obsolete German units of measurement
7,400		Netherlands				
7,409	(for comparison)				4 meridian minutes	
7,419.2		Kingdom of Hanover				Obsolete German units of measurement
7,419.4		Duchy of Brunswick				Obsolete German units of measurement
7,420.4; 7,414.9		Bavaria				Obsolete German units of measurement
7,420.439	geographic mile				1/15 equatorial grads	
7,421.6	(for comparison)				4 equatorial minutes	
7,448.7		Württemberg				Obsolete German units of measurement
7,450		Hohenzollern				Obsolete German units of measurement
7,467.6		Russia			7 verst	Obsolete Russian units of measurement
7,480		Bohemia				
7,500	kleine / neue Postmeile (small/new postal mile)	Saxony		1840		German Empire, North German Confederation, Grand Duchy of Hesse, Russia. Obsolete German units of measurement
7,532.5	Land(es)meile (German state mile)	Denmark, Hamburg, Prussia				Primarily for Denmark defined by Ole Rømer. Obsolete German units of measurement
7,585.9	Postmeile (post mile)	Austro-Hungary				Austrian units of measurement
7,850	Milă	Romania				
8,534.31	Mila	Poland	1819			7146 meters before 1819, also equaled 7 verst
8,800		Schleswig-Holstein				Obsolete German units of measurement
8,888.89		Baden				Obsolete German units of measurement
9,062	mittlere Post- / Polizeimeile (middle post mile or police mile)	Saxony		1722		Obsolete German units of measurement
9,206.3		Electorate of Hesse				Obsolete German units of measurement
9,261.4	(for comparison)				5 meridian minutes	
9,277	(for comparison)				5 equatorial minutes	
9,323	alte Landmeile (old state mile)	Hanover		1836		Obsolete German units of measurement
9,347	alte Landmeile (old state mile)	Hanover		1836		Obsolete German units of measurement
9,869.6		Oldenburg				
10,000	metric mile, Scandinavian mile	Norway, Sweden		today		Still commonly used today, e.g. for road distances; equates to the myriametre
10,044	große Meile (great mile)	Westphalia				Obsolete German units of measurement
10,670		Finland				
10,688.54	mil	Sweden		1889		In normal speech, "mil" means a Scandinavian mile of 10 km.
11,113.7	(for comparison)				6 meridian minutes	
11,132.4	(for comparison)				6 equatorial minutes	
11,299	mil	Norway				was equivalent to 3,000 Rhenish rods.

Similar units:

- 1,066.8 m – verst, see also obsolete Russian units of measurement

== Idioms ==
The mile is still used in a variety of idioms, even in English-speaking countries that have moved from the Imperial to the metric system (for example, Australia, Canada, or New Zealand). These idioms include:

- A country mile is used colloquially to denote a very long distance
- "A miss is as good as a mile" (failure by a narrow margin is no better than any other failure)
- "Give him an inch and he'll take a mile" – a corruption of "Give him an inch and he'll take an ell" (the person in question will become greedy if shown generosity)
- "Missed by a mile" (missed by a wide margin)
- "Go a mile a minute" (move very quickly)
- "Talk a mile a minute" (speak at a rapid rate)
- "To go the extra mile" (to put in extra effort)
- "Miles away" (lost in thought, or daydreaming)
- "Milestone" (an event indicating significant progress)
- Glasgow's miles better, a touristic campaign.

== See also ==
- Biblical mile
- Chinese mile (里)
- Data mile
- Food miles
- Four-minute mile
- Geographical mile
- Medieval weights and measures
- Mile run
- Scandinavian mile
- Section lines
