= Alen (unit of length) =

Scandinavian unit of measurement

The alen or aln is a traditional Scandinavian unit of distance similar to the north German elle, roughly 60 centimeters long. The Danish alen, also used in Norway, was 62.77 centimetres (24.71 in), equal to 2 Danish fod. The Swedish aln was 59.38 centimetres (23.38 in).
