= Tønne (unit) =

Norwegian unit of volume

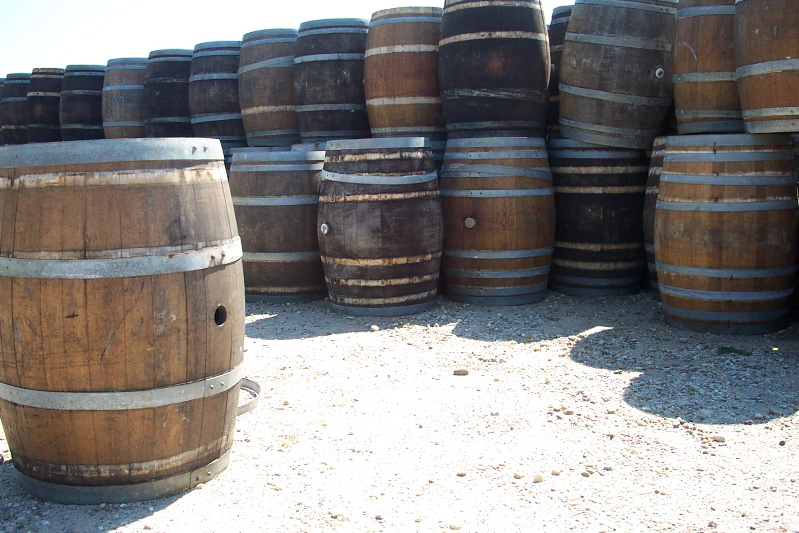
Barrels

A tønne (plural tønner) is an old Norwegian unit of volume equivalent to a barrel. There was a dry tønne and a liquid tønne. The volume of a tønne has varied over time in Norway, including many local variations.

The dry tønne was standardized in 1824 as equivalent to 138.97 liters (3.944 U.S. bu). A tønne of potatoes weighed about 100 kilograms (220 lb). A dry tønne was divided into four fjerdinger, equivalent to 34.71 liters (0.985 U.S. bu) each. The liquid tønne was equivalent to 115.81 liters (25.47 imp gal; 30.59 U.S. gal).

In addition, the term tønne (a "barrel of land") was used as a measurement of area equivalent to 3,937 square meters (0.973 acres). This corresponded to the amount of land that could be sown with one tønne of seed.
