= Örkaggens Järnväg =

Private Railway in Sweden

Overview
- Locale: Sweden
- Dates of operation: 1974–current

Technical
- Track gauge: 600 mm (1 ft 11 5/8 in)
- Length: 2.3 kilometers (1.43 miles))

Örkaggens Järnväg (ÖkJ, the Örkaggen Railway) is a privately owned, 600 mm (1 ft 11 5/8 in) narrow gauge railway in southern Sweden and has a total length of approximately 2.3 kilometers (1.43 mi). The railway was built to transport firewood from the forest to the farmhouse and logs to the side of the road for further transportation with a lorry.

The railway began construction on privately owned land in 1974 after the necessary rails were bought from an abandoned peat bog railway near Tibro in Västergötland. By the end of the 1970s a total of 800 meters (1/2 mile) of track was in service.

The railway has four motorized locomotives and a motorized draisine. There is also one small self-made steam locomotive, however it is not used since it is not powerful enough. The railway also has four passenger wagons and 16 goods wagons.
