= Obsolete Finnish units of measurement =

The obsolete Finnish units of measurement consist mostly of a variety of units traditionally used in Finland that are similar to those that were traditionally used in other countries and are still used in the United Kingdom (imperial units) and the United States (United States customary units).

== History ==
Very few of these units are sometimes still used in everyday speech and even when buying and measuring things as shorthand for similar amounts in the metric system. For example, kappa (sometimes called isokappa) is still used at markets to measure exactly five liters of potatoes. When ordering firewood, some customers (and even dealers) use syli to refer to a cubic meter, but some old people use the term to refer to various much larger amounts of firewood.

Most Finnish obsolete units of measurement were identical to Swedish units of measurement, including units of length being based on the Swedish "foot" (29.69 cm) that was defined in 1605, since Finland was part of Sweden from the Middle Ages to 1809, but later some Russian units were also used in parallel throughout the 19th century.

The measurements were first standardized by law in 1665 and were revised in 1734. Before this, measurements often varied between towns. The king's bailiff in the town of Porvoo, for example, used two sets of measures: a big one for collecting tax in kind from the populace and a smaller set to remit the assets to the king, keeping the difference for himself. However, nowadays the proverb mitata Porvoon mitalla (to measure in Porvoo units) has a positive meaning of measuring in excess or generously.

Certain units were standardized to the metric system in 1861, and Finland fully converted to the metric system in 1886. The metric system was legally optional from 1887 and compulsory from 1892.

== Length ==
Table of length units
Unit	Relative value	Metric value	Imperial value	Notes
linja	1/144	~2.06 mm	~0.081 in	= Swedish linje; 1/12 of a tuuma (tum), i.e. 1/144 of a jalka (fot)
tuuma	1/12	~24.74 mm	~0.97 in	= Swedish tum, defined as 1/12 of a jalka (fot), nominally the width of a thumb. Inch translates into tuuma in Finnish. Metrinen tuuma = 25 mm.
vaaksa	1/2	~148.44 mm	~5.84 in	= Swedish kvarter or kvartdel (both meaning "quarter"); defined as 1/4 of a kyynärä (aln) though originally the distance between the tips of little finger and thumb, with fingers fully extended; today defined as 150 mm
jalka	1	~296.9 mm	~11.68 in	= Swedish fot, which translates into jalka in Finnish. It is within 1 mm of 296 mm, the commonly accepted length of the Roman foot (pes), and was defined in law in 1665 for all of Sweden, which then included Finland, as 1/2 of a kyynärä (aln), replacing older regional units of length. And it being very similar to a Roman foot was known, since a proclamation from king Gustavus Adolphus in 1627 referred to the "Roman foot" when ordering the 296.9 mm Swedish fot to be used in the mining areas of central Sweden
kyynärä	2	~593.8 mm	~1.94 ft	= Swedish aln, 2 jalka (fot), nominally the distance from the elbow to the fingertips; the unit of length used for measuring everyday lengths, and the base measure that all other units of length, both longer and shorter, were based on. Defined in law in 1605, replacing older regional units of length, based on an aln that had been used in southern Sweden for at least 500 years by then. Metrinen kyynärä = 500 mm. Cf. cubit and ell.
syli	6	~1.78 m	~5.84 ft	= Swedish famn, defined as 3 kyynärä (aln), though nominally the distance between the fingertips of both hands when the arms are raised horizontally to the sides. In maritime contexts, syli is 1/1,000 of nautical mile (1.852 m). Cf. fathom
vakomitta	720	~213.6 m	~700.78 ft	The furrow's length on a field. Cf. furlong.
virsta	3,600	~1,068.84 m	~0.66 mi	1/10 of a Swedish mil; the Finnish name is related to the Russian verst, which was of almost exactly the same length
ruotsinvirsta	9,000	~2,672.1 m	~1.66 mi	= Swedish fjärdingsväg, 1/4 of a peninkulma (mil); referred to as ruotsinvirsta (Swedish virsta) in Finnish during the 19th C
peninkulma (old)		~6,000 m	~3.73 mi	Old unit of length used in what today is Finland until replaced by the new peninkulma below during the 17th C
peninkulma (new)	36,000	~10.6884 km	~6.64 mi	= pre-metric Swedish mil, defined as 18,000 kyynärä (aln)
päivämatka	72,000	~20 km	~12.42 mi	= Swedish dagsresa, literally "one day's travel"; by law the maximum distance between coaching inns along main long-distance roads

=== Maritime units ===
- meripeninkulma – 1,852 m. Same as nautical mile. One angular minute at equator.
- kaapelinmitta – 185.2 m. 1/10 of a nautical mile.
- syli – 1.852 m. 1/1,000 of a nautical mile. Used for measuring depth.
- solmu – nautical miles per hour. Same as knot. Speed unit.

Obsolete:

- merisekunti* – 30.8666 m. 1/60 of nautical mile
- meritertia* – 0.51444 m. 1/3,600 of nautical mile

== Area ==
Table of area units
Unit	Relative value	Metric value	Imperial value	Notes
kannunala	1/56	~88.15 m^{2}	~948.83 sq ft (105.43 sq yd)	= Swedish kannland, defined as 1/56 of a tynnyrinala (tunnland) and thus equal to 1,000 square jalka (fot)
kapanala	1/32	~154.26 m^{2}	~1,660.46 sq ft (184.5 sq yd)	= Swedish kappland, defined as 1/32 of a tynnyrinala (tunnland) and thus equal to 1,750 square jalka (fot)
panninala	1/2	~2,468.19 m^{2}	~26,537.37 sq ft (2,951.93 sq yd)	= Swedish spannland, defined as 1/2 of a tynnyrinala (tunnland) and thus equal to 16 kapanala (kappland), or 28,000 square jalka (fot)
tynnyrinala	1	~4,936.38 m^{2}	~53,134.7 sq ft (5,903.85 sq yd or ~1.22 acres)	= Swedish tunnland, defined as 14,000 square kyynärä (aln), i.e. 56,0000 square jalka (fot); nominally the area (of field) that could be sown with one barrel of grain

== Volume ==
=== Dry measure ===
Table of volume (dry) units
Unit	Relative value	Metric value	Imperial value	Notes
jumpru	1/16	~81.8 ml	~2.9 fl. oz	From Swedish jungfru, virgin. Also for liquids.
kortteli	1/4	~327.15 ml	~11.51 fl. oz.	Used for both length (14.845 cm, same as vaaksa) and volume. Name derives from Swedish kvartdel, meaning "quarter". As unit of length 1/4 of kyynärä.
tuoppi	1	~1.3274 L	~46.72 fl. oz (2.336 pt)	Literally tankard. Also for liquids.
kannu	2	~2.6172 L	~4.61 pt	Lit. "jug". Also called pikkukappa (exactly 2.5 L).
kappa	4	~5.4961 L	9.67 pt (4.84 qt)	Still in use (as exactly 5 liters) as kappa or isokappa at market places to measure potatoes.
nelikko	32	~43.986 L	38.72 qt (9.68 gal.)	Used for dry measure.
panni	64	~87.96 L	19.36 gal.	Used for dry measure.
tynnyri	128	~175 L	38.49 gal.	Barrel for dry measure.
lästi	1,536	~2,110 L	464.14 gal.	Used for dry measure.

=== Liquid measure ===
Table of volume (liquid) units
Unit	Relative value	Metric value	Imperial value	Notes
jumpru	1/16	~81.78 ml		= Swedish jungfru, meaning maiden/virgin
kortteli	1/4	~327.1 ml		= Swedish kvarter, also written as kvartdel, both meaning quarter; a name used for both length, as a quarter of a kyynärä (aln), and volume, as a quarter of a tuoppi (stop)
tuoppi	1	~1.3085 l		= Swedish stop, meaning tankard; used for liquids
kannu	2	~2.617 l		= Swedish kanna, meaning jug; also called pikkukappa (exactly 2.5 L)
kappa	4	~5.234 l		= Swedish kappe / kappa; also used for dry substances.
ankkuri	30	~39.255 L		= Swedish ankare, literally meaning "anchor"; used for liquids
tynnyri	96	~125.616 L		= Swedish tunna; barrel for liquid measure. There were also several other sizes of barrel in common use, each standardized for a specific type of content.
lästi	1,152	~1,507.4 L		= Swedish läst; used for liquid measure, equalling 12 tynnyri (tunna). There were also other sizes of lästi (läst) in common use, each standardized for a specific type of content.

== Mass ==
Table of mass units
Unit	Relative value	Metric value	Imperial value	Notes
kvintiini	1/128	~3.321 g		= Swedish qvintin, defined as 1/4 of a luoti (lod); there were also a number of gradually even smaller units of mass, mainly used by pharmacists
luoti	1/32	~13.283 g		= Swedish lod; when firearms were introduced during the late medieval period it was found that one luoti (lod) of lead was perfect for a musket ball, leading to musket balls also being referred to as luoti (lod)
unssi	1/16	~26,566 g		= Swedish uns
markka	1/2	~212.538 g		= Swedish mark; the namesake for a medieval Swedish, and through that also Finnish, monetary unit, originally consisting of one mark silver (cf. pound sterling), and later also the name of the Finnish monetary unit 1861–2002
naula	1	~425.076 g		= Swedish skålpund, with the weight given, based on an older skålpund viktualievikt, defined for all of Sweden, including Finland, during major reforms of units of length, area, mass and volume in the early 17th C; metrinen naula = 500 g; the Imperial pound may be translated naula although pauna is exact
leiviskä	20	~8.501 kg		= Swedish lispund, defined as 20 naula (skålpund); metrinen leiviskä = 10 kg
sentneri	100	~42.5076 kg		Introduced in the mid 19th C, with one sentneri (centner) being 100 naula (skålpund); 1 Senttaali = 200 metrinen naula = 100 kg.
kippunta	400	~170.03 kg		= Swedish skeppspund, defined as 20 leiviskä (lispund) each of 20 naula (skålpund)

== Miscellaneous ==
- askel (pace) – Roughly one meter for an adult male—a rough but convenient way to measure distances while walking.
- hehto – hectoliter, 100 liters, potatoes
- kivenheitto (Throw of a rock) – 100 kyynärä (approx 60 m), today used to describe something to be very near (from Swedish stenkast also literally meaning "throw of a stone/rock")
- poronkusema – (approximately 7.5 km). A Sami measurement of distance; the distance a reindeer can travel before needing to stop to urinate. Today used to describe something that is at a very obscure distance away.
- Poronkusemaa kuukaudessa – (poronkusemas per month) similar to furlongs per fortnight, about 2.9 mm/s
- tusina – 12 (from Swedish "dussin" = dozen)
- toltti – 12 (lumber)
- tiu – 20 (eggs) (from Swedish tjog, previously used for 20 of anything, not only eggs)
- puntti – 20 (matchboxes)
- kerpo – 31 (lampreys; 30 as a bunch and one for tying)
- krossi – 144 (items) (from Swedish gross = 12 dozens; originally from French douzaine grosse meaning "large dozen")
- kiihtelys – 40 (squirrel pelts)
- riisi – 500 (paper sheets) (from Swedish ris, with the same meaning)
- tonni – 1,000 (usually refers to 1,000 kg, but can refer also anything of 1,000, especially money)
- motti – 1 m^{3} (firewood or waste paper), also 1 dm^{3} in "motin pullo", a 1-litre bottle, usually of alcohol

== See also ==
- Swedish units of measurement
- Russian units of measurement
- Historical weights and measures
- List of obsolete units of measurement
- Petrograd Standard
- International System of Units
- Weights and measures

== Sources ==
- Gyllenbok, Jan (25 April 2018). "Finland". Encyclopaedia of Historical Metrology, Weights, and Measures: Volume 2. Birkhäuser. pp. 1075–1089. ISBN 978-3-319-66691-4.
