= Nykil =

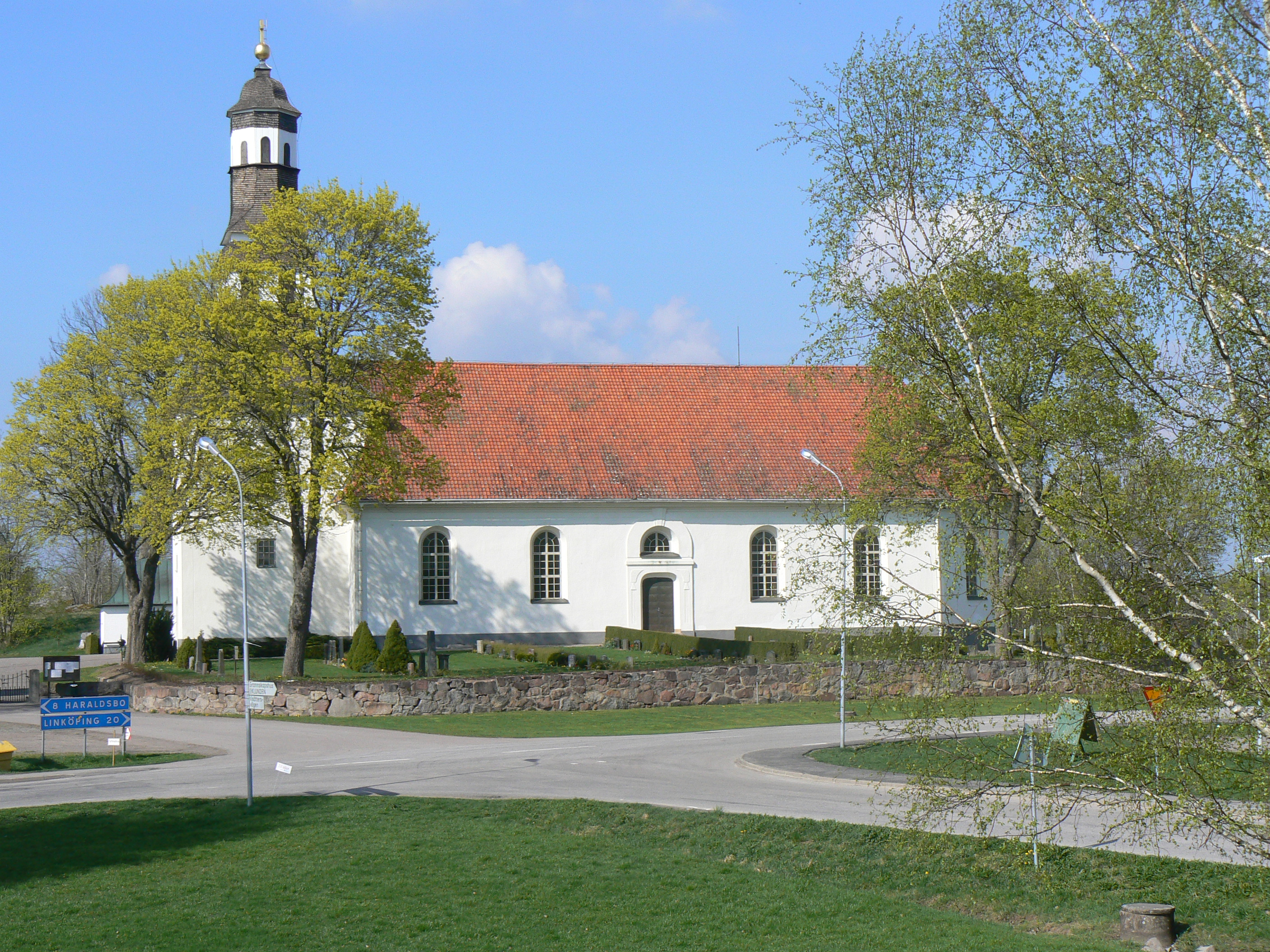
- Nykil church

- Location within Östergötland Location within Sweden
- Coordinates: 58°17′N 15°27′E
- Country: Sweden
- Province: Östergötland
- County: Östergötland County
- Municipality: Linköping Municipality

Area
  - Total: 0.37 km^{2} (0.14 sq mi)

Population (2025)
  - Total: 400
  - Density: 1,081/km^{2} (2,800/sq mi)
- Time zone: UTC+1 (CET)
  - Summer (DST): UTC+2 (CEST)

Nykil is a locality situated in Linköping Municipality, Östergötland County, Sweden with 400 inhabitants in 2025.

== Society ==
In Nykil there is the Nykil church, convenience store, school and preschool.
