= Danish units of measurement =

The units of measurement in use in Denmark are currently part of the metric system. A variety of other historical weights and measures have been employed throughout the nation's history.

== History ==
The Danes started with a system of units based on a Greek pous ("foot") of 308.4 millimetres (1.012 ft) which they picked up through trade in the late Bronze Age/early Iron Age. Some early standards of measure can be recovered from measured drawings made of the 52.5-foot-long (16.0 m) Hjortspring boat, which though dating to the early Iron Age exemplifies plank-built vessels of the late Bronze Age and the 82-foot-long (25 m) Nydam ship. Thwarts are typically spaced about 3 fod apart.

King Christian V of Denmark introduced an office to oversee weights and measures, a justervæsen. This was first led by the royal mathematician Ole Rømer, who established a national system of weights and measures on May 1, 1683. Rømer's system, which he updated in 1698, was based on the Rhine foot. Its definitions included the following:

- the Danish mile as 24,000 Rhineland feet (i.e. 4 minutes of arc latitude)
- the Danish pound (pund) as 1/62 of the weight of a cubic Rhineland foot of water (499.7 g)
- the Danish ell (alen) as 2 Rhineland feet (630 mm)

Rømer also suggested a pendulum definition for the foot (although this would not be implemented until after his death), and invented an early temperature scale.

The metric system was introduced in 1907.

== Length ==
See also Danish rute (rod)

- mil – Danish mile. Towards the end of the 17th century, Ole Rømer, Gerardus Mercator and other contemporaries of the great Dutch cartographer Thisus began following Claudius Ptolemy in connecting the mile to the great circle of the earth, and Roemer defined it as 12,000 alen. This definition was adopted in 1816 as the Prussian Meile. The coordinated definition from 1835 was 7.532 km. Earlier, there were many variants, the most commonplace the Sjællandsk miil of 17,600 alen or 11.13 km (6.92 mi).
- palme – palm, for circumference, 8.86 cm (3.49 in)
- alen – ell, 2 fod
- fod – foot, about 313.85 mm (12.356 inches) in most recent usage. Defined as a Rheinfuss 314.07 mm (12.365 inches) from 1683, before that 314.1 mm (12.366 in) with variations.
- rut – 5026 mm, 16 fod.
- kvarter – quarter, 1/4 alen
- tomme – thumb (inch), 1/12 fod
- linie – line, 1/12 tomme
- skrupel – scruple, 1/12 linie

== Area ==
- tønde land – Barrel of land, 8 skæpper land

== Volume ==
- pægl (da) – peg a quarter pot, 242 mL
- potte – pot, from 1683 1/32 cubic fod, about in 19th and 20th centuries
- smørtønde – barrel of butter, from 1683, 136 potter
- korntønde – barrel of corn (grain), from 1683 144 potter

unit	relation to previous	metric value	Imperial Value
potte		966 mL	2.04 Pt

== Weight ==
- pund – pound, from 1683 the weight of 1/62 cubic fod of water, 499.75 g (1.1 lb)

== Miscellaneous ==
- dusin – dozen, 12
- snes – score, 20
- skok – 60
- ol – 4 snese, 80
- gros – gross, 144

== See also ==
- Weights and measures
- Historical weights and measures
- SI
