= Swedish units of measurement =

Traditional Swedish units of measurement were standardized by law in 1665, prior to which they only existed as a number of related but differing local variants. The system was slightly revised in 1735. In 1855, a decimal reform was instituted that defined a new Swedish inch as 1/10 Swedish foot (2.96 cm or 1.17 inches). Up to the middle of the 19th century, there was a law allowing the imposition of the death penalty for falsifying weights or measures. After a decision by the parliament in 1875, Sweden adopted the metric system on 22 November 1878, with a ten-year transition period until 1 January 1889.

As part of the transition, the Swedish mil measurement was maintained, but was shortened from 18000 alnar – the equivalent of 10.69 km (6.64 mi) – to exactly 10 kilometres (6.2 mi). This measurement is still in use in both Sweden and Norway (which were in a union at the time).

The Swedish units of measurement system was in effect also in Finland until 1809, and thereafter supplanted with the Russian units of measurement. Finland went Metric 1886.

== Old length units ==
The Swedish units of length included the following:

- aln – "forearm" (cf. ell) (pl. alnar). After 1863, 59.37 centimetres (1.948 feet). Before that, from 1605, 59.38 cm as defined by King Carl IX of Sweden in Norrköping 1604, based on Rydaholmsalnen.
- famn – "fathom", 3 alnar.
- fot – "foot", 1/2 aln. Before 1863, the Stockholm fot was the commonly accepted unit, at 29.69 cm (0.974 ft).
- kvarter – "quarter", 1/4 aln.
- tum or verktum – "inch", 1/6 kvarter or 1/12 fot, making it 2.47 centimetres (0.97 inches).
- linje – "line", after 1863 1/10 tum, 2.96 mm (0.117 in). Before that, 1/12 tum or 2.06 mm.
- mil – "mile", also lantmil. From 1699, defined as a unity mile of 18000 alnar or 10.69 km (6.64 mi). The unified mile was meant to define the suitable distance between inns. After the 1889 metric conversion the Swedish mil is defined as exactly 10 kilometers.
- nymil – "new mile" from 1889, 10 km exactly. Commonly used to this day, only referred to as mil.
- kyndemil – the distance a torch will last, approx 16 km (9.9 mi).
- skogsmil, rast – distance between rests in the woods, approx. 5 km (3.1 mi).
- fjärdingsväg – 1/4 mil.
- stenkast – "stone's throw", about 50 m (164 ft), used to this day as an approximate measure.
- rev – 160 fot, for land measurement, was 100 fot after 1855.
- stång – 16 fot, for land measurement.
- tum – "thumb" (inch), 1/12 fot, 2.474 cm (0.974 in). After 1863 decimaltum, 1/10 fot, 2.96 cm, not much accepted by professional users in mechanics and carpentry who later switched to English inch (2.54 cm, abandoned only late 20th century) and metric system.
- tvärhand – "hand", 4.0 in.

== Old area units ==
- kannaland – 1000 fot^{2}, or 88.15 m^{2} (948.8 sq ft)
- kappland – 154.3 m^{2} (1,661 sq ft).
- spannland – 16 kappland
- tunnland – 2 spannland or 4,937.6 m^{2} (53,148 sq ft), about 1 acre
- kvadratmil – Square mil, 36 million square favnar, from 1739.
- hektar - 100x100m, still commonly used for land area of farms.

== Old volume units ==
unit	relation to previous	metric value	Imperial Value
pot	-	0.966 L	0.850 imp qt; 1.021 US qt
tunna	2 spann	-	
ankare	-	39.26 L	34.54 imp qt; 41.49 US qt
åm	155 pottor	149.73 L	131.74 imp qt; 158.22 US qt
storfamn	-	3770 L (3.77 m³)	3,320 imp qt; 3,980 US qt (830 imp gal; 1,000 US gal or 133 cu ft)
kubikfamn	-	5850 L (5.85 m³)	5,150 imp qt; 6,180 US qt (1,290 imp gal; 1,550 US gal or 207 cu ft)

== Old weight units ==
- mark – 1/2 skålpund. Was used from the Viking era, when it was approx. 203 g (7.2 oz).

unit	relation to previous	metric value	Imperial Value
skeppspund	20 lispund	170.03 kg	374.852 lb
bismerpund	12 skålpund	5.101 kg.	11.246 lb
lispund	20 skålpund	8.502 kg	18.744 lb
skålpund	2 mark	0.42507 kg	0.937 lb
mark	50 ort	212.5 g	7.496 oz
ort		4.2508 g	65.6 gr

== Nautical units still in use ==
unit	relationship	metric value	Imperial Value
nautisk mil		1852 m	2,025 yd
distansminut		1852 m	2,025 yd
sjömil (modern)		1852 m	2,025 yd

== Old monetary units ==
- daler – From 1534, Swedish thaler. From 1873, replaced by the krona.
- riksdaler – From 1624, 1 1/2 daler, from 1681 2 daler, from 1715 3 daler, from 1776 6 daler
- skilling – From 1776, 1/48 riksdaler
- mark – From 1534, 1/3 daler. From 1604, 1/4 daler.
- öre – From 1534, 1/8 mark. Subsequently replaced by the skilling, but from 1855 reintroduced as 1/100 riksdaler.

== See also ==
- Obsolete Finnish units of measurement
- Historical weights and measures
- Petrograd Standard
- International System of Units
- Weights and measures
