= Metrication =

Conversion to the metric system of measurement

Countries shown in green have converted, or substantially converted, to the metric system. Those shown in red have not made its use mandatory: Liberia, Myanmar and the United States, and in practice the Federated States of Micronesia, the Marshall Islands and Palau.

Metrication or metrification is the act or process of converting to the metric system of measurement. All over the world, countries have transitioned from local and traditional units of measurement to the metric system. This process began in France during the 1790s and has continued over more than two centuries. As of 2011, about 95% of the world's population lived in countries where the modern metric system was the only legal system of measurement. Certain countries and sectors are nonetheless either still transitioning or have chosen not to fully adopt the metric system.

== Overview ==
The process of metrication is typically initiated and overseen by a country's government, generally motivated by the necessity of establishing a uniform measurement system for effective international cooperation in fields like trade and science. Governments achieve metrication through either mandatory changes to existing units within a specified timeframe or through voluntary adoption.

While metric use is mandatory in some countries and voluntary in others, all countries have recognised and adopted the SI, albeit to different degrees, including the United States.

According to the U.S. National Institute of Standards and Technology (NIST), only three countries do not have mandatory metric laws: Liberia, Myanmar and the United States. A research paper by Vera (2011) identified further countries where metric use was not mandatory in practice, including the three Compact of Free Association states: the Federated States of Micronesia, the Marshall Islands and Palau. (Note: Vera also listed Samoa, which has since made metric units mandatory in trade.)

In 2013, the Myanmar Ministry of Commerce announced that Myanmar was preparing to adopt the metric system as the country's official system of measurement, and metrication in Myanmar began, with some progress made (road signs and temperature are legislated to be in metric), although there has been very little progress in local trade. In 2018, the Liberian government had pledged to adopt the metric system. The Liberia Standards Authority, established by law in 2022 and operationalised in 2024, replaced the country's National Standards Laboratory and was given responsibility for national measurement in trade and for traceability to SI units.

As of 2026, the United States has a national policy of adopting the metric system based on the Metric Conversion Act of 1975, amended by the Omnibus Trade and Competitiveness Act of 1988, and Presidential Executive Order 12770 of 1991, and all United States government agencies are required to adopt it.

The metrication process can take years to implement and complete: for instance, Guyana adopted the metric system in 2002 and was only able to make it mandatory in local trade 2017 after the metric system was fully adopted in schools. Antigua and Barbuda, also officially metric, is moving slowly in its metrication process, with a new push in 2011 for all government agencies to convert by 2013 and the entire country to use the metric system by the first quarter of 2015. Other metric Caribbean countries, such as Saint Lucia officially metric 2000, are still in the process toward full conversion.

Other countries have begun the process but chosen not to finish it. The United Kingdom, for example, began metricating in 1965, but in 1979 the government decided against any further compulsory conversion. Metric units are now the primary legal units for trade, but imperial units are still used on road signs and for draught beer, and may be shown alongside metric units in shops. After a public consultation, the government confirmed in 2023 that it would keep these rules unchanged.

The United Kingdom and the United States face ongoing resistance toward metrication, which may be partially rooted in a belief that their cultural identity is intertwined with the traditional measurement systems they historically have used.

== History ==
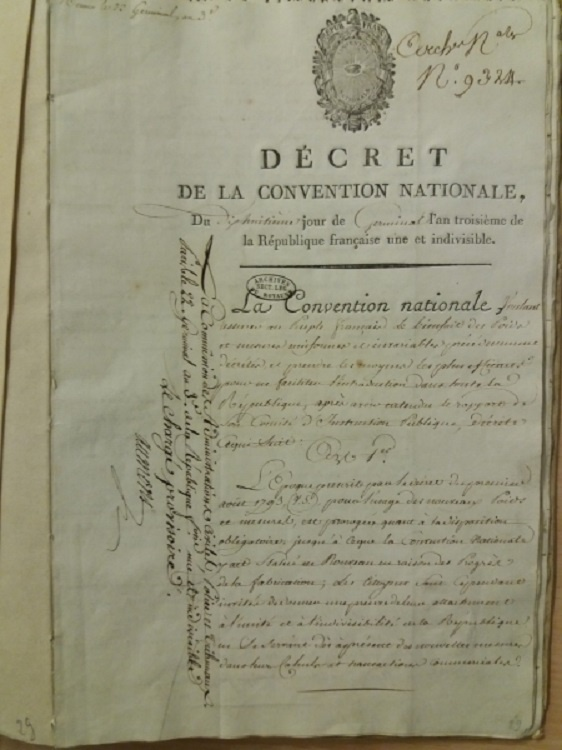
French national Convention decree of April 1795 establishing the metric system

Metrication began in France and spread outwards over the following century. The pattern set in France — abrupt introduction, partial retreat in the face of public resistance, then completion a generation later — recurs in many of the national programmes that followed. The metre was made the exclusive measure in 1801 under the French Consulate, but in 1812 Napoleon reintroduced familiar unit names, redefined in metric terms and made uniform, as the mesures usuelles. These remained in use until Louis Philippe restored the metric system in full from 1840.

Two forces carried the system beyond France. The first was political consolidation. A single set of units was a convenient compromise wherever separate states were being merged, as in the Netherlands, the German states and Italy. Portugal adopted the system in 1814, the first country outside the French Empire to do so; Spain followed in 1849, and most of Latin America within the following decade, Chile having already converted by 1848. Where adoption was not driven by unification it was often driven by trade, and resistance was strongest in the United Kingdom and the United States.

The second force was science, and cartography in particular: national surveys could only be joined and compared if they shared a length standard. Britain and the United States, for all their resistance in trade, were among the first to adopt a metric standard for cartography. The sections below trace how individual countries made the change, and how the scientific need for common standards led to the Metre Convention of 1875.

=== France (1795–1840) ===
The introduction of the metric system into France in 1795 was done on a district by district basis with Paris being the first district. By modern standards the transition was poorly managed. Although thousands of pamphlets were distributed, the Agency of Weights and Measures who oversaw the introduction badly underestimated the work involved. Paris alone needed 500,000 metre sticks, yet one month after the metre became the sole legal unit of measure, they only had 25,000 in store. This, combined with the excesses of the Revolution and the high level of illiteracy in 18th century France, made the metric system unpopular.

Napoleon himself ridiculed the metric system but, as an able administrator, recognised the value of a sound basis for a system of measurement. Under the décret impérial du 12 février 1812 (imperial decree of 12 February 1812), a new system of measure – the mesures usuelles ("customary measures") was introduced for use in small retail businesses – all government, legal and similar works still had to use the metric system and the metric system continued to be taught at all levels of education. That system reintroduced the names of many units used during the ancient regime, but their values were redefined in terms of metric units. Thus the toise was defined as being two metres, with six pieds making up one toise, twelve pouces making up one pied and twelve lignes making up one pouce. Likewise the livre was defined as being 500 g, each livre comprising sixteen once and each once eight gros and the aune as 120 centimetres. This intermediate step eased the transition to a metric-based system.

By the Loi du 4 juillet 1837 (the law of 4 July 1837), Louis Philippe I effectively revoked the use of mesures usuelles by reaffirming the laws of measurement of 1795 and 1799 to be used from 1 May 1840. However, many units of measure, such as the livre (for half a kilogram), remained in everyday use for many years, and to a residual extent up to this day for the livre.

=== Continental Europe in the 19th century ===
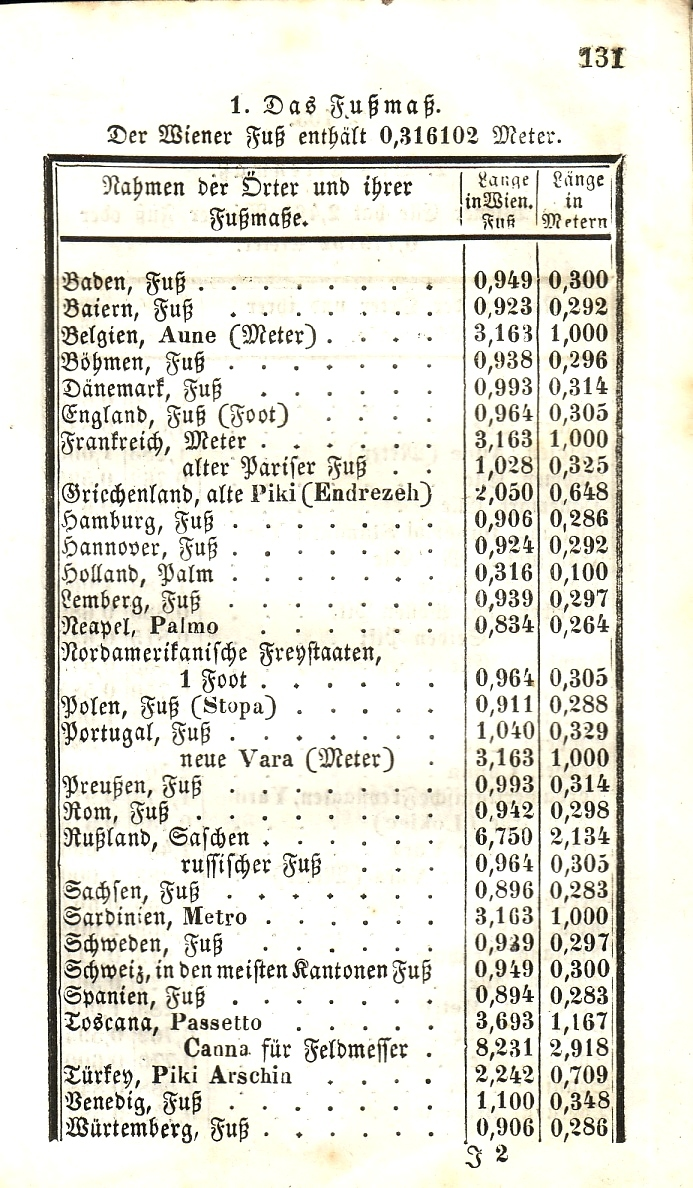
Conversion table in an 1848 German schoolbook showing the metric equivalent of the foot in use in over two dozen countries, including several German states

The countries below are listed in the order in which they first adopted metric units.

==== Italy (1797–1870) ====
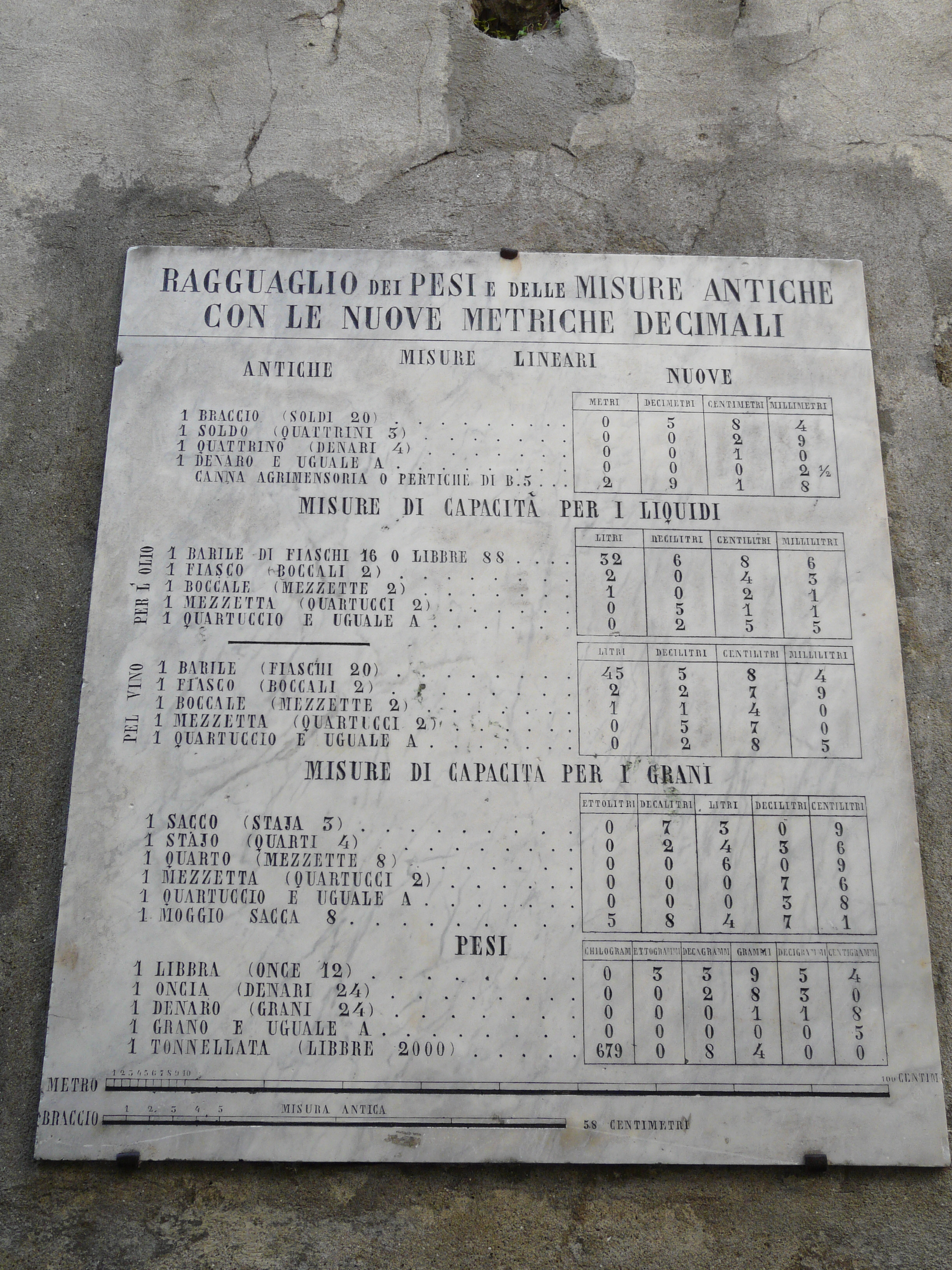
Tablet showing conversions of legacy units of weights and measures to metric units, Vicopisano, Tuscany

The Cisalpine Republic, a North Italian republic set up by Napoleon in 1797 with its capital at Milan, first adopted a modified form of the metric system based on the braccio cisalpino (Cisalpine cubit) which was defined to be half a metre. In 1802 the Cisalpine Republic was renamed the Italian Republic, with Napoleon as its head of state. The following year the Cisalpine system of measure was replaced by the metric system.

In 1806, the Italian Republic was replaced by the Kingdom of Italy with Napoleon as its emperor. By 1812, all of Italy from Rome northwards was under the control of Napoleon, either as French Departments or as part of the Kingdom of Italy, ensuring that the metric system was in use throughout this region.

After the Congress of Vienna, the various Italian states reverted to their original systems of measurements, but in 1845 the Kingdom of Piedmont and Sardinia passed legislation to introduce the metric system within five years. By 1860, most of Italy had been unified under the King of Sardinia Victor Emmanuel II; and under Law 132 of 28 July 1861 the metric system became the official system of measurement throughout the kingdom. Numerous Tavole di ragguaglio (conversion tables) were displayed in shops until 31 December 1870.

==== Netherlands (1799–1820) ====
The Netherlands (as the revolutionary Batavian Republic) began to use the metric system from 1799 but, as with its co-revolutionaries in France, encountered numerous practical difficulties. Subsequently, as part of the First French Empire since 1809, the Netherlands used Napoleon's mesures usuelles from their introduction in 1812 until the fall of his Empire in 1815. Under the (Dutch) Weights and Measures Act of 21 August 1816 and the Royal decree of 27 March 1817 (Koningklijk besluit van den 27 Maart 1817), the newly formed Kingdom of the Netherlands abandoned the mesures usuelles in favour of the "Dutch" metric system (Nederlands metrisch stelsel), which came into force in 1820 and in which metric units were simply given the names of units of measure that were then in use: for instance the ons (ounce) was defined as 100 g.

==== Switzerland (1801–1877) ====
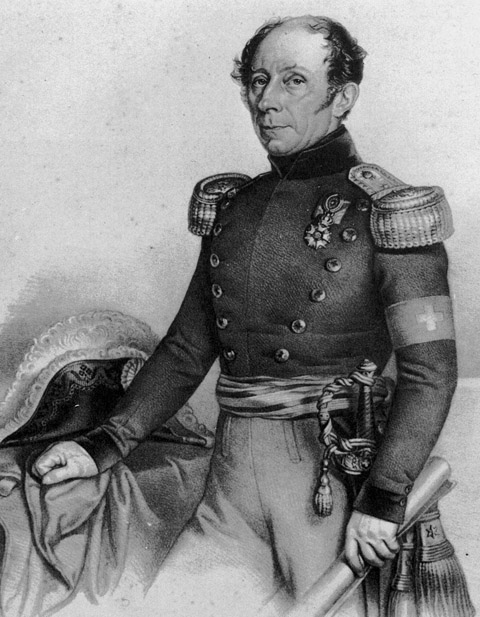
Guillaume Henri Dufour, founder of Swisstopo

In 1801, the Helvetic Republic at the instigation of Johann Georg Tralles promulgated a law introducing the metric system. However this was never applied, because in 1803 the competence for weights and measures returned to the cantons. On the territory of the current canton of Jura, then annexed to France (Mont-Terrible), the metre was adopted in 1800. The Canton of Geneva adopted the metric system in 1813, the canton of Vaud in 1822, the canton of Valais in 1824 and the canton of Neuchâtel in 1857. In 1835, twelve cantons of the Swiss Plateau and the north-east adopted a concordat based on the federal foot (exactly 0.3 m) which entered into force in 1836. The cantons of central and eastern Switzerland, as well as the Alpine cantons, continued to use the old measures.

Unlike the French "customary toise"—which was equivalent to two metres and divided into 6 feet of 12 inches (or 144 lines)—the Swiss "federal toise" measured 1.8 metres and was divided into six federal feet of thirty centimetres, themselves divided into ten inches of ten lines.

Cartography pushed in the opposite direction to the federal foot. Guillaume-Henri Dufour founded a topographic office in Geneva in 1838 — the future Federal Office of Topography — which published the first official map of Switzerland between 1845 and 1864. The map commission chose decimal measures and adopted the metre as the linear unit, at a scale of 1:100,000; each sheet carried both a metric scale and one in Swiss leagues of 4,800 metres, and the sheet frames were graduated in centesimal minutes so that kilometres could be read directly along the meridians.

Under the 1848 Constitution the federal foot was to come into force throughout the country, but a committee chaired by Dufour argued for keeping the decimal metric system in the French-speaking cantons. A founding member of the International Committee of the Red Cross, Dufour contributed from 1861 onwards to the creation of the Central European Arc Measurement as a member of the Swiss Geodetic Commission. In 1864, in his report to the Swiss Geodetic Commission regarding the general conference in Berlin of the Central European Arc Measurement, Adolphe Hirsch expressed his fear that the choice of the Bessel toise as the international standard would deter France from joining the International Geodetic Association, which was then still in the formative stage. In 1866, in Neuchâtel, Carlos Ibáñez e Ibáñez de Ibero proposed Spain's accession to the Central European Arc Measurement. It was the examination of discrepancies between the various geodetic rods used by geodesists that led the Central European Arc Measurement—during the 1866 meeting of its Permanent Commission in Neuchâtel—to consider establishing a global institute for the comparison of geodetic standards, a first step toward the creation of the International Bureau of Weights and Measures.

In 1868 the metric system was legalised alongside the federal foot, a first step towards its definitive introduction; cantonal calibrators were supervised by a Federal Bureau of Verification created in 1862 and managed from 1864 by Heinrich von Wild. In 1869, he co-signed—along with Otto Wilhelm von Struve and Moritz von Jacobi—the report that the St. Petersburg Academy of Sciences addressed to the French Academy of Sciences, inviting it to join in a concerted effort to ensure the universal adoption of the metric system across all scientific fields. In 1875 responsibility for weights and measures passed from the cantons back to the Confederation, Switzerland (represented by Adolphe Hirsch) joined the Metre Convention, and a federal law imposed the metric system from 1 January 1877. Switzerland adopted the International System of Units in 1977.

==== Germany (1810–1877) ====
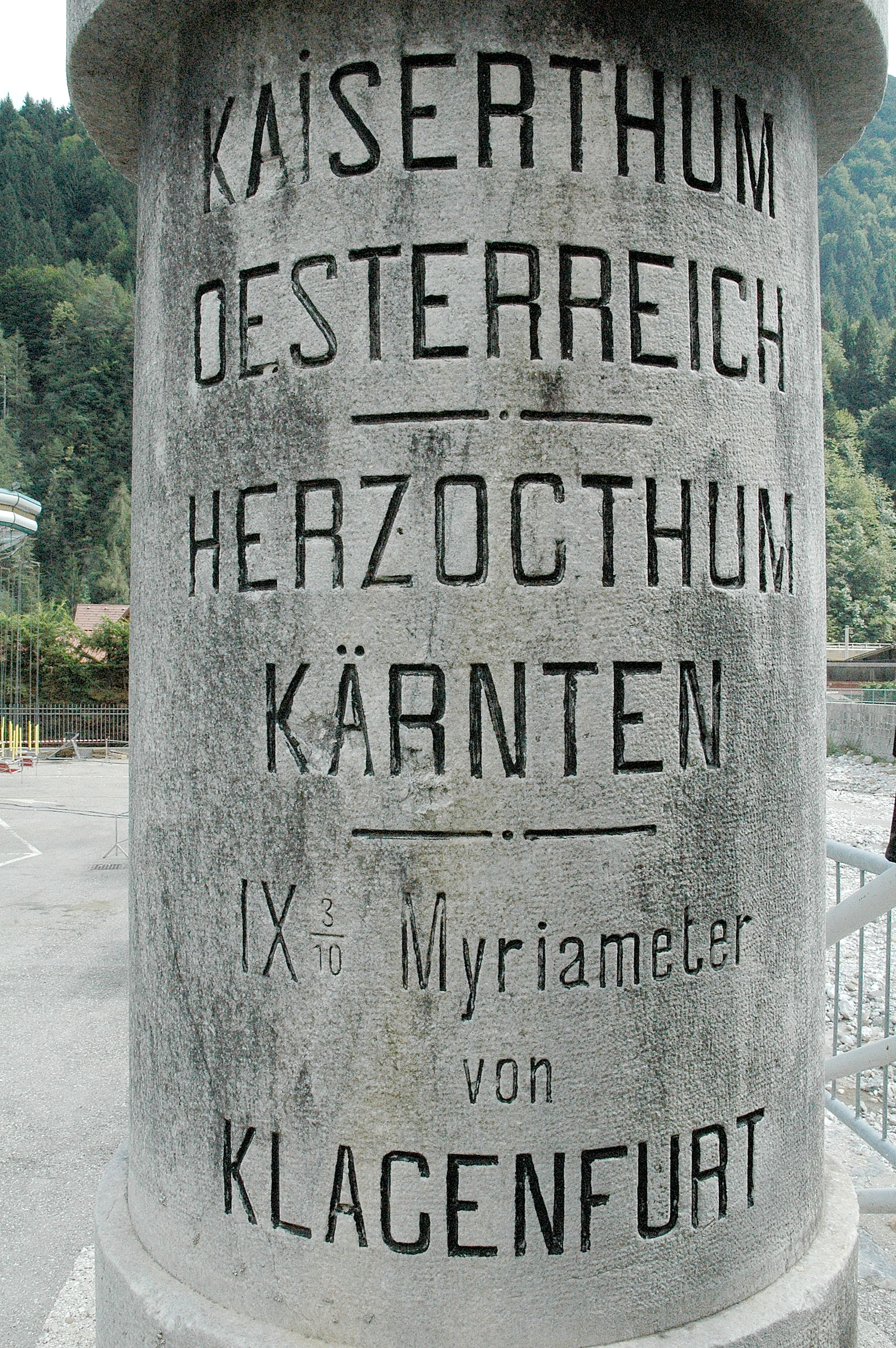
Stone marking the Austro-Hungarian/Italian border at Pontebba displaying myriametres (10 km), a unit used in Central Europe in the 19th century

At the outbreak of the French Revolution, much of modern-day Germany and Austria were part of the Holy Roman Empire which had become a loose federation of kingdoms, principalities, free cities, bishoprics and other fiefdoms, each with its own system of measurement, though in most cases the systems were loosely derived from the Carolingian system instituted by Charlemagne a thousand years earlier.

During the Napoleonic era, some of the German states moved to reform their systems of measurement using the prototype metre and kilogram as the basis of the new units. Baden, in 1810, for example, redefined the Ruthe (rods) as being 3.0 m exactly and defined the subunits of the Ruthe as 1 Ruthe = 10 Fuß (feet) = 100 Zoll (inches) = 1,000 Linie (lines) = 10,000 Punkt (points) (for simplicity at the expense of grammar, these are the singular forms of each name) while the Pfund was defined as 500 g, divided into 30 Loth, each of 16.67 g. Bavaria, in its reform of 1811, trimmed the Bavarian Pfund from 561.288 g to 560 g exactly, consisting of 32 Loth, each of 17.5 g while the Prussian Pfund remained at 467.711 g.

After the Congress of Vienna there was a degree of commercial cooperation between the various German states resulting in the German Customs Union (Zollverein). There were, however, still many barriers to trade until Bavaria took the lead in establishing the General German Commercial Code in 1856. As part of the code the Zollverein introduced the Zollpfund (Customs Pound) which was defined as exactly 500 g and could be split into 30 'lot'. This unit was used for inter-state movement of goods, but was not applied in all states for internal use.

Although the Zollverein collapsed after the Austro-Prussian War of 1866, the metric system became the official system of measurement in the newly formed German Empire in 1872 and of Austria in 1875. The Zollpfund ceased to be legal in Germany after 1877.

==== Portugal (1814) ====
In August 1814, Portugal officially adopted the metric system but with the names of the units substituted by Portuguese traditional ones. In this system the basic units were the mão-travessa (hand) = 1 decimetre (10 mão-travessas = 1 vara (yard) = 1 metre), the canada = 1 litre and the libra (pound) = 1 kilogram.

==== Spain (1849) ====
Until the ascent of the Bourbon monarchy in Spain in 1700, each region of Spain had its own system of measurement. The new Bourbon monarchy tried to centralise control and with it the system of measurement. There were debates regarding the desirability of retaining the Castilian units of measure or, in the interests of harmonisation, adopting the French system. Although Spain assisted Méchain in his meridian survey, the Government feared the French revolutionary movement and reinforced the Castilian units of measure to counter such movements. By 1849 however, it proved difficult to maintain the old system and in that year the metric system became the legal system of measure in Spain. Spain's national survey then made it a leading advocate of the metre internationally, as described below.

=== International standardisation (1832–1889) ===
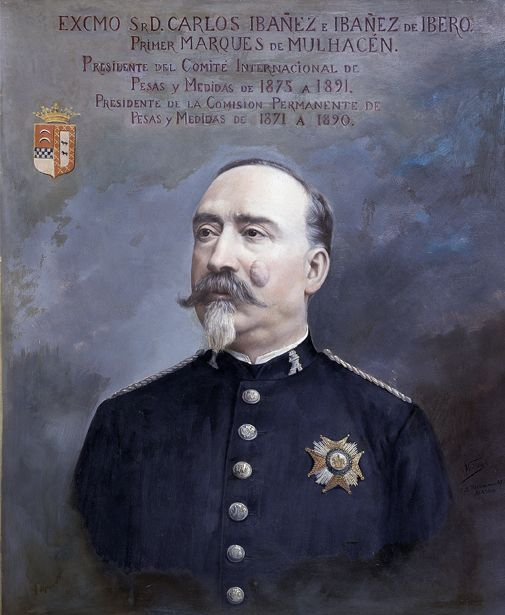
Don Carlos Ibáñez e Ibáñez de Ibero, first president of the International Geodetic Association and of the International Committee for Weights and Measures

Scientists pushed the metric system forward internationally well before most governments had adopted it at home. In 1832 Carl Friedrich Gauss proposed adding the second to the metre and the kilogram as base units, in the form of the CGS system, and in 1836 he founded the Magnetischer Verein with Alexander von Humboldt and Wilhelm Eduard Weber, the first international scientific association. It was followed by the Central European Arc Measurement (German: Mitteleuropäische Gradmessung), founded on the initiative of Johann Jacob Baeyer in 1863, and by the International Meteorological Organisation, whose second president, the Swiss Heinrich von Wild, represented Russia on the International Committee for Weights and Measures.

Geodesy made the need for common standards pressing. Surveyors needed standards that could be compared against one another to within fractions of a millimetre, which in practice meant comparison against Borda's toise, the reference for all French baselines, and careful control of temperature. Carlos Ibáñez e Ibáñez de Ibero, appointed in 1853 to produce a large-scale map of Spain, had a geodetic measuring apparatus built in Paris and compared it against Borda's double-toise N°1. Copies of the Spanish standard were made for Egypt, France and Germany.

In 1858, an Egyptian Technical Commission had been set up to continue, by adopting the procedures instituted in Europe, the cadastre work, inaugurated by means of the cassaba (Qaṣbah قصبة an ancient Arabic unit of measurement), under Muhammad Ali. This Commission suggested to Viceroy Mohammed Sa'id Pasha the idea of building geodetic devices which were ordered in France. The Khedive entrusted to Ismail Mustafa al-Falaki the study, in Europe, of the precision apparatus calibrated against the metre intended to measure the geodetic baselines and already built by Jean Brunner in Paris. Ismail Mustafa had the task to carry out the experiments necessary for determining the expansion coefficients of the two platinum and brass rulers, and to compare Egyptian standard with a known standard. The Spanish standard designed by Carlos Ibáñez e Ibáñez de Ibero and Frutos Saavedra Meneses was chosen for this purpose, as it had served as a model for the construction of the Egyptian standard. In addition, the Spanish standard had been compared with Borda's double-toise N° 1, which served as a comparison module for the measurement of all geodetic baselines in France.

Several national exhibitions served as effective means of promoting the metric system. During the 1867 Paris Universal Exposition, a Committee on Weights and Measures and Coins was established and declared itself in favor of the universal adoption of the metric system. The United Kingdom of Great Britain and Ireland, Italy, Russia, and Spain were represented on this committee by Leone Levi, Faustino Malaguti, Moritz von Jacobi, and Ramón de la Sagra, respectively; the committee was chaired by Claude-Louis Mathieu, with Edmond Becquerel serving as vice-chair and Henri Baudrillart as secretary. Its membership included representatives from France, the Netherlands, Belgium, Prussia and the North German Confederation, the South German states, Austria-Hungary, Switzerland, Spain, Denmark, Sweden-Norway, Russia, Italy, the Ottoman Empire, Egypt, Japan, China, Morocco, Tunisia, Brazil, the United States of America, and the United Kingdom of Great Britain and Ireland.

Spain and Portugal joined the Central European Arc Measurement in 1866. At its 1867 conference in Berlin, a committee chaired by Otto Wilhelm von Struve recommended replacing the toise with the metre and creating a new international prototype metre against which national standards could be compared. In 1869 the Saint Petersburg Academy of Sciences invited the French Academy of Sciences to act jointly to secure universal scientific use of the metric system, and Napoleon III convened the International Metre Commission, which met in Paris in 1870. The Franco-Prussian War broke out and the Second French Empire collapsed, but the commission reconvened in 1872 with about thirty countries taking part, leading to the Metre Convention of 20 May 1875 and the creation of the International Bureau of Weights and Measures.

Ibáñez represented Spain at the 1875 conference and was elected the first president of the International Committee for Weights and Measures. His work resulted in the distribution of platinum–iridium prototypes of the metre to all states party to the convention at the first meeting of the General Conference on Weights and Measures in 1889; these prototypes defined the metre until 1960.

Representing a unit of length by the distance between two fine lines on the surface of a metal bar at a given temperature is never free from uncertainty and probable error, owing to the difficulty of knowing the bar's precise temperature at any given moment. Transferring this unit—or a multiple thereof—to a measuring bar is affected not only by observational errors but also by errors stemming from temperature uncertainty in both bars. The thermometers required for this purpose must be designed with the utmost care, and their graduation and index errors must be determined meticulously. The BIPM's work on thermometry led to the discovery of special iron-nickel alloys—specifically Invar and Elinvar—for which the Swiss physicist Charles-Édouard Guillaume received the Nobel Prize in Physics in 1920. The BIPM played a central role in the measurement of geodetic baselines on a global scale, as Charles-Édouard Guillaume's discovery of Invar minimized the impact of temperature-related errors.

=== United Kingdom (1824–present) ===
The Weights and Measures Act 1824 (5 Geo. 4. c. 74) imposed one standard 'imperial' system of weights and measures on the British Empire. The effect of this act was to standardise existing British units of measure rather than to align them with the metric system.

During the next eighty years a number of parliamentary select committees recommended the adoption of the metric system, each with a greater degree of urgency, but Parliament prevaricated. A select committee report of 1862 recommended compulsory metrication, but with an "Intermediate permissive phase"; Parliament responded in 1864 by legalising metric units only for 'contracts and dealings'. The United Kingdom initially declined to sign the Treaty of the Metre, but acceded in 1884. Meanwhile, British scientists and technologists were at the forefront of the metrication movement – it was the British Association for the Advancement of Science that promoted the CGS system of units as a coherent system and it was the British firm Johnson Matthey that was accepted by the CGPM in 1889 to cast the international prototype metre and kilogram.

In 1895, another parliamentary select committee recommended the compulsory adoption of the metric system after a two-year permissive period. The Weights and Measures (Metric System) Act 1897 (60 & 61 Vict. c. 46) legalised the metric units for trade, but did not make them mandatory. A bill to make the metric system compulsory to help the British industrial base fight off the challenge of the nascent German base passed through the House of Lords in 1904, but did not pass in the House of Commons before the next general election was called. Following opposition by the Lancashire cotton industry, a similar bill was defeated in the House of Commons in 1907 by 150 votes to 118.

In 1965, with lobbying from British industry and the prospect of joining the Common Market, Britain began an official programme of metrication with a 10-year target for full conversion, and created the Metrication Board in 1969. Metrication occurred in some areas during this time period, including the re-surveying of Ordnance Survey maps in 1970, decimalisation of the currency in 1971, and teaching the metric system in schools. No plans were made to make the use of the metric system compulsory, and the Metrication Board was abolished in 1980 following a change in government.

As of 2026, goods sold by weight or measure must be sold in metric units, with three exceptions. Draught beer and cider must be served in set fractions or multiples of the pint. Milk in returnable containers may be sold by the pint, and precious metals by the troy ounce. Imperial units may also be shown alongside metric units, but not more prominently.

The government's 2022 consultation, Choice on units of measurement: markings and sales, drew around 100,000 responses, of which only about 1% favoured greater use of imperial units, and the existing rules on the sale of goods were retained. In December 2023 the government confirmed that it would not legislate for wider use of imperial measures, announcing instead a narrower change to the permitted pack sizes for wine. The Weights and Measures (Intoxicating Liquor) (Amendment) Regulations 2024 added 200 ml and 568 ml (one imperial pint) to the specified quantities for pre-packed still wine, and 500 ml and 568 ml for sparkling wine. The Product Regulation and Metrology Act 2025, which received royal assent on 21 July 2025, amended the Weights and Measures Act 1985 and gave the Secretary of State power to make regulations about units of measurement and the quantities in which goods are marketed.

In addition imperial units may be used exclusively where a product is sold by description, rather than by weight/mass/volume: e.g. television screen and clothing sizes tend to be given in inches only, but a piece of material priced per inch would be unlawful unless the metric price was also shown.

Surveys show that imperial units are still widely used for height, body weight, speed and long distances. Younger people are more likely to use metric units for short distances and for weighing goods.

=== United States (1830–present) ===
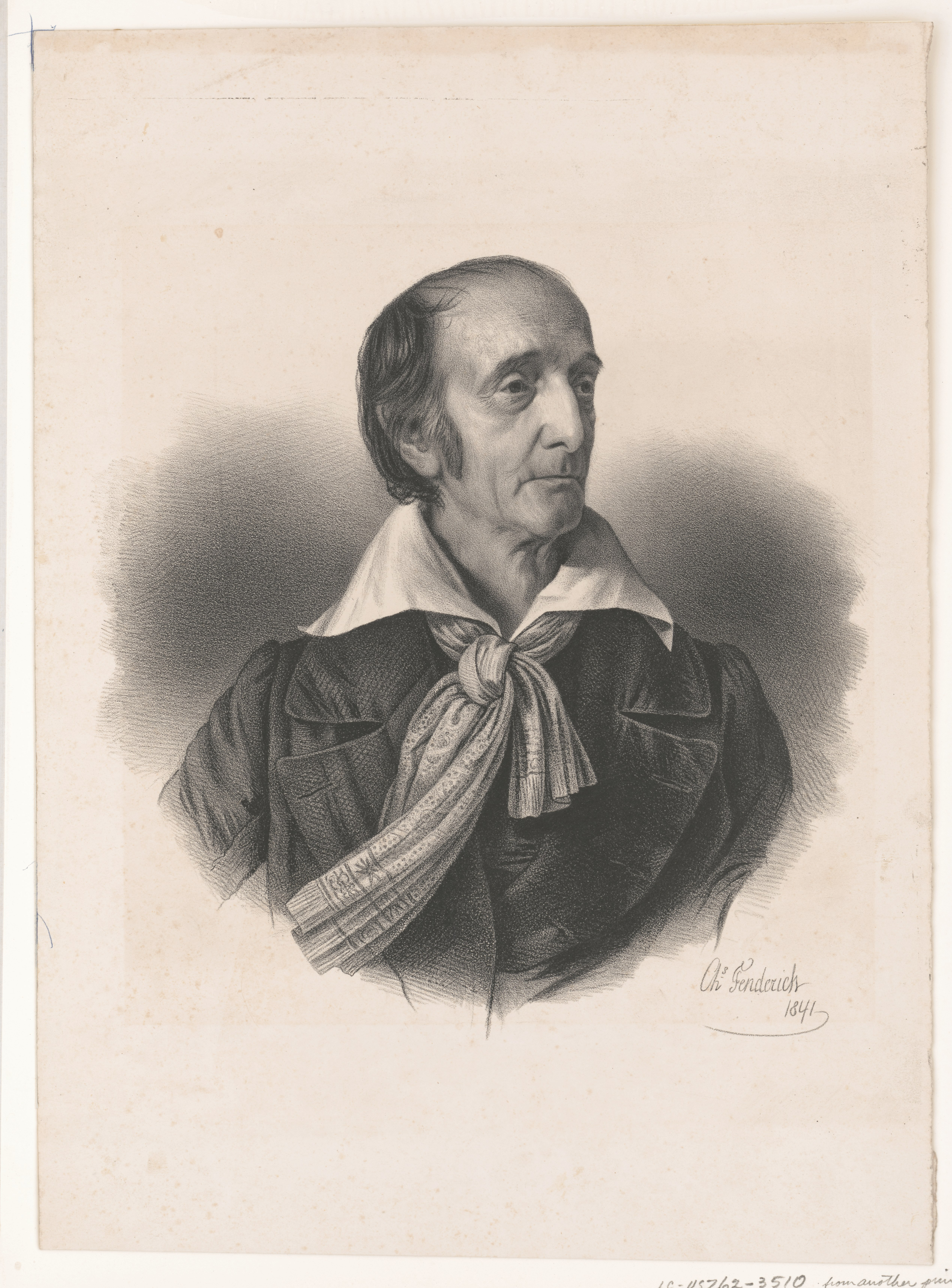
Ferdinand Rudolph Hassler, first superintendent of the United States Coast Survey

In 1830 the United States Congress decided to create national standards for length and weight. A Swiss geodesist Ferdinand Rudolph Hassler, who had brought copies of the French metre and kilogram to the United States in 1805, was mandated to work on the new standards and proposed to adopt the metric system. The Congress opted for British standards of length and weight, the Parliamentary Standard yard of 1758 and the Troy Pound of 1824 respectively. Nevertheless, all distances measured by the Survey of the Coast (renamed the United States Coast Survey in 1836 and the United States Coast and Geodetic Survey in 1878), under Hassler's leadership, were referred to the metre; in 1817, the primary baseline was measured using 2-metre (6 ft 7 in) iron bars which Hassler brought from Europe for this purpose.

In 1866 the United States Congress passed a bill making it lawful to use the metric system for commercial and legal purposes in the United States, without displacing customary units such as the yard and pound. The bill, which was permissive rather than mandatory in nature, defined the metric system in terms of customary units rather than the international prototype metre and kilogram. The non-mandatory nature of the adoption has resulted in a much slower pace of adoption in the U.S. than in other countries.

By 1893, the reference standards for customary units had become unreliable. The Mendenhall Order redefined them, using the conversion factors of the 1866 act, in terms of the national prototype metres and kilograms which the United States already possessed as a signatory of the Metre Convention, and which were calibrated against those in use elsewhere in the world. In 1896, a bill that would make the metric system mandatory in the United States was presented to Congress. Twenty-three of the 29 people who gave evidence before the congressional committee who were considering the bill were in favor of it, but six were against. Four of these six dissenters represented manufacturing interests and the other two were from the United States Revenue service. The grounds cited were the cost and inconvenience of the change-over. The bill was not enacted and later bills failed too.

In 1971, the U.S. National Bureau of Standards completed a three-year study of the impact of increasing worldwide metric use on the US. The study concluded with a report to Congress entitled A Metric America – A Decision Whose Time Has Come. Since then metric use has increased in the US, principally in the manufacturing and educational sectors. Public Law 93-380, enacted 21 August 1974, states that it is the policy of the U.S. to encourage educational agencies and institutions to prepare students to use the metric system of measurement with ease and facility as a part of the regular education program. On 23 December 1975, President Gerald Ford signed Public Law 94–168, the Metric Conversion Act of 1975. This act declares a national policy of coordinating the increasing use of the metric system in the US. It established a U.S. Metric Board whose functions as of 1 October 1982 were transferred to the Dept of Commerce, Office of Metric Programs, to coordinate the voluntary conversion to the metric system.

In January 2007 NASA decided to use metric units for all future Moon missions, in line with the practice of other space agencies.

=== Other English-speaking countries ===
The British metrication programme signalled the start of metrication programmes elsewhere in the Commonwealth, though India had started its programme in 1956, nine years before the United Kingdom. South Africa (then not a member of the Commonwealth) set up a Metrication Advisory Board in 1967, New Zealand set up its Metric Advisory Board in 1969, Australia passed the Metric Conversion Act in 1970 and Canada appointed a Metrication Commission in 1971.

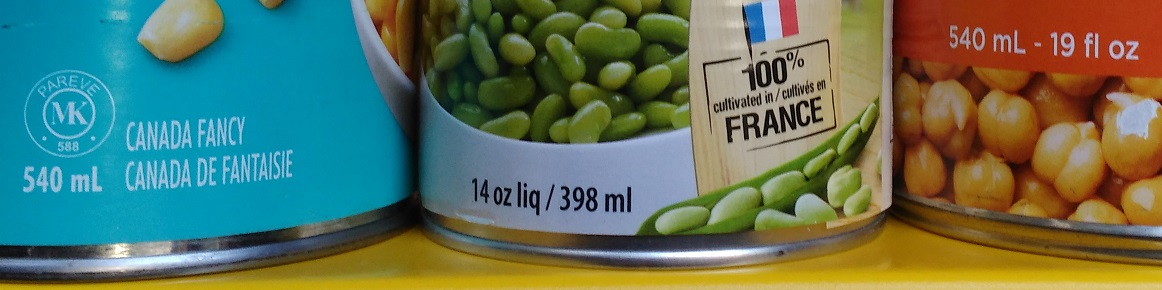
The metric units of measurement on Canadian canned food labels are merely the equivalent of the still widely used imperial units such as the ounce.

Metrication in Australia, New Zealand and South Africa was essentially complete within a decade, while in Canada the programme stalled and was effectively abandoned in 1985, when the Metric Commission was wound up. In Canada, the square foot is still widespread for commercial and residential advertisements and partially in construction because of the close trade relations with the United States. Metric measurements on food products such as canned food are often merely the equivalent of the still widely used imperial units of measurement such as the ounce and the pound. Butter in Canada is sold in 454 g packagings, which is the equivalent of one pound. The railways of Canada such as the Canadian National and Canadian Pacific as well as commuter rail services continue to measure their trackage in miles and speed limits in miles per hour because they also operate in the United States (although urban railways including subways and light rail have adopted kilometres and kilometres per hour). Canadian railcars show weight figures in both imperial and metric. Most other Commonwealth countries adopted the metric system during the 1970s.

Apart from the United Kingdom and Canada, which have effectively halted their metrication programs, the great majority of countries using the imperial system have completed official metrication during the second half of the 20th century or the first decade of the 21st century. The most recent to complete this process was the Republic of Ireland, which began metric conversion in the 1970s and completed it in early 2005. Hong Kong uses three systems (Chinese, imperial, and metric) and all three are permitted for use in trade.

== Global status of metrication ==
=== Status by country/region ===
Countries by their dominant system of measurement (metric, imperial, and US customary) as of 2025 (based on popular and official usage)

Links in the country/region point to articles about metrication in that country/region.

Overview of global metrication
Year official metrication process started	Country/Region	Previous system of measure	Current official status of metrication
1795	France	French	Metric
1814	Portugal (Note: Including Portuguese colonies, most of them now independent countries.)	Portuguese	Metric
1820	Belgium	Belgian	Metric
1820	Netherlands	Dutch	Metric
1843	Algeria	Algerian	Metric
1848	Chile	Chilean (variants of Spanish)	Metric
1852	Mexico	Mexican (variants of Spanish)	Metric, (some national and regional units are still in use and some United States customary units also in use in some industries)
1852	Spain	Spanish	Metric
1860; 1906	Philippines	Philippine (Spanish, US customary and local)	Mainly metric. The Philippines first adopted the metric system in 1860 because of the Spanish Colonial government; U.S. customary units were introduced by the American Colonial government; however, the metric system was made the official system of measurement in 1906 through Act No. 1519, s. 1906. U.S. customary units still in use for body measurements and small products while the metric system is used for larger measurements; e.g. floor area, highway length, tonnage.
1861	Italy	Italian	Metric
1862	Brazil	Brazilian (variants of Portuguese)	Metric, but some non-metric units are used for specific areas: rural land – alqueire; cattle weight – arroba; screen sizes – polegada (inch); tyre pressure – libra-força por polegada quadrada, but referred by its English abbreviation: psi.
1862	Peru	Peruvian (variants of Spanish)	Metric, but inches (pulgadas) are used for screen sizes and tires. Fuel is sold in U.S. gallons (galones).
1863	Uruguay	Uruguayan (variants of Spanish)	Metric
1863	Argentina	Argentine (variants of Spanish)	Metric
1864	Romania	Romanian	Metric
1866	United States of America (Note: The metric system was lawfully recognized and permitted for all purposes nationwide by the Metric Act of 1866. However, no law establishing a mandatory metric conversion program has been enacted. The 1975 Metric Conversion Act established the United States Metric Board to encourage voluntary metrication, but this board was dissolved in 1982. The Metric Conversion Act was amended in 1988 to officially recognize the SI as "the preferred system of weights and measures for United States trade and commerce", though United States customary units remain dominant in official use.)	United States customary units	Metric and U.S. customary units; customary units remain dominant in common and official use.
1868	North German Confederation (including German Poland)	German	Metric
1869	South German states	German	Metric
1871	Austria (including Austrian Poland)	Austrian	Metric
1872 (Note: Many German states, particularly those under French tutelage during the Napoleonic Wars (Rheinbund) adopted the metre 1806–15.)	Germany	German	Metric
1873	Serbia	Serbian	Metric
1874	Hungary	Hungarian	Metric
1875	Ottoman Empire/Turkey	Ottoman	Metric
1875	Norway	Norwegian	Metric
1876	Sweden	Swedish	Metric, the previous unit of length mil, redefined in 1876 as exactly 10 km, is however still in informal everyday use for long or approximate distances
1876	Switzerland	Swiss	Metric
1878	Mauritius	Mauritian (English, French)	Metric
1886	Finland	Finnish	Metric
1895	Tunisia	Tunisian (Arabic, Turc)	Metric
1897	Madagascar	Malagasy	Metric
1899	Paraguay	Paraguayan (variants of Spanish)	Metric
1907	Denmark	Danish	Metric
1907	Iceland	Icelandic / Danish	Metric
1908	Costa Rica	Costa Rican (variants of Spanish)	Metric
1912	Dominican Republic	Spanish	Metric
1918	Russia	Russian	Metric
1920	Poland (former Congress Poland and Russian partition)	Polish	Metric
1920	Haiti	Haitian (variants of French)	Metric
1920	Greece 1959	Greek and Ancient Greek	Metric
1923	Morocco	Moroccan (Arabic, Turc)	Metric
1923	Iran	Persian	Metric
1923	Thailand	Thai	Metric
1924	Japan	Japanese	Metric, with continued informal use of the gō serving size, tsubo for floorspace.
1924	Latvia	Latvian	Metric
1925	China	Chinese	Metric. Wet markets continue to use jin (catty) and liang for weight, land area is still given in mu, and other traditional units (e.g., chi for length) continue to be used informally in everyday language. The People's Republic of China has defined these units so that conversion factors to SI are simple fractions or whole numbers. (See the article on Chinese units of measurement for differences in definitions between the PRC, ROC, and other Sinosphere countries and regions.)
1926	Afghanistan	Afghan (Persian, Arab, Indian)	Metric
1929	Estonia	Estonian	Metric
1946	Indonesia	Indonesian	Metric, however AC units are still measured and advertised in horsepower. Informally, floorspace or rural/agrarian land measured differently in each local regions (Sundanese regions tend to use "bata/tumbak", Javanese regions use "ubin/rakit/kesuk/bahu/ru", "rante" in Malay regions, "borong/anggar" in West Kalimantan, "ubin/iring/lupit/tampah" in other regions, etc.).
1948	Israel	Ottoman and Biblical and Talmudic	Metric
1950	Somalia	Somali	Metric
1954	Sudan	Sudanese (various)	Metric
1956	India	Indian	Metric. The Standards of Weights and Measures Act 1956 came into force on 1 October 1958; metric weights became mandatory in October 1960 and metric measures in April 1962.
1961	South Korea	Korean	Metric, use of the pyeong of floorspace is still in use.
1963	Ethiopia	Ethiopian	Metric
1963	Laos	Laotian (various)	Metric
1963	Vietnam	Vietnamese	Metric
1965	United Kingdom (Note: Phased transition announced in 1965)	Imperial	Metric and imperial. Metric is the primary legal system for trade. Imperial units remain authorised for draught beer and cider, milk in returnable containers and precious metals, and are required on road distance and speed signs.
1967	Ireland	Irish then Irish measure prior to 1824, and imperial.	Metric, however Draught beer and cider are required to be sold by imperial pint; troy ounce for precious metals also legal. Floor area is still commonly advertised using square feet.
1967	Pakistan	Pakistani and imperial	Metric
1969	New Zealand	Imperial	Metric
1970	Australia	Imperial	Metric, (real estate, especially farmland, above a certain size is still frequently advertised in hectares or, somewhat less frequently, acres. Human weights were traditionally measured in stones, and this is still in occasional use by older generations; this however is rapidly dying out.)
1970	Canada	Imperial	Metric and imperial (body measurements are referred to in imperial units, and certain industries such as real estate, construction, and home appliances still use imperial measurements due to a high reliance on American manufacturing.) Metrication was halted in 1985.
1971	Singapore	Malay and imperial	Metric (land and property areas are still at times measured with square foot or hectare)
1971	South Africa (Note: Including South-West Africa, now Namibia)	South African and imperial	Metric
1972	Malaysia	Malay and imperial	Metric, with some traditional wet markets and pasar pagi still using the Malay units. Imperial units are widely used such as size of the real estate are often denoted by square feet rather than square metres.
1975	North Korea	Korean	Metric, with formal continued use of traditional units
1975	Ghana	Imperial	Metric
1976	Sri Lanka	Sri Lankan and imperial	Metric
1976	Hong Kong	Imperial, Chinese	Metric is the legislated dominant system of measurement, however Chinese units and imperial units are still legal under Weights and Measures Ordinance. The usage of Chinese units or imperial units are still common on fresh food sales (e.g. wet markets). Lengths are still commonly measured in imperial units, in particular in cables, textiles or clothing. Real estates still use square foot as area measurement unit.
1984	Taiwan	Taiwanese	Metric (traditional wet markets and real estate still use Taiwanese units.)
1992	Macau	Imperial, Chinese (also United States customary units)	Metric
1998	Jamaica	Imperial	Metric, On 10 June 2015, the Jamaican government passed the Road Traffic Bill 2014, which formally repealed and replaced the Road Traffic Act and Regulations 1938. The act included updates to Jamaica's traffic laws along with the use of the metric system within regulatory descriptions. On 18 September 2015, the Jamaican government amended the Weights and Measure Act to include considerable fines to business owners who do not use the metric system.
2004	Trinidad and Tobago	Imperial	Metric, in 2004 Trinidad and Tobago passed legislation making the International System of Units shall be the primary system of measurement in Trinidad and Tobago in 2015.
2005	Saint Lucia	Imperial	Metric
Indeterminate	Liberia (Note: See also Liberia measurement system.)	United States customary units	Metric and US customary. The Liberian government has begun transitioning from U.S. customary units to the metric system, and pledged in 2018 to adopt it. However, this change has been gradual, with government reports concurrently using both systems.
2011 (Note: In June 2011, the Myanmar government's Ministry of Commerce began discussing proposals to reform the measurement system in Myanmar and adopt the metric system used by most of its trading partners.); 2013	Myanmar	Burmese and imperial	Metric and traditional Burmese units, which remain in use in local trade, Announcement of full metrication in 2014, with technical assistance from the German National Metrology Institute. Distances and speed limits on road signs are shown in kilometres (per hour), and height clearance signs are shown in metres; fuel is measured and sold in litres; and meteorological data and weather reports are shown in degrees Celsius for temperatures, millimetres for precipitation and kilometres per hour for wind speed.
2015	Samoa	Traditional units	Metric, The Metrology Act 2015 mandates the use of metric/SI units in trade, with a transition period of one year.

== Methods of conversion ==
There are three common ways that nations convert from traditional measurement systems to the metric system. The first is the quick or "Big-Bang" route. The second way is to phase in units over time and progressively outlaw traditional units. This method, favoured by some industrial nations, is slower and generally less complete. The third way is to redefine traditional units in metric terms. This has been used successfully where traditional units were ill-defined and had regional variations.

The "Big-Bang" way is to simultaneously outlaw the use of pre-metric measurement, metricate, reissue all government publications and laws, and change education systems to metric. India was the first Commonwealth country to use this method of conversion. Its changeover ran from 1 October 1958, when the Standards of Weights and Measures Act 1956 came into force, through October 1960, when metric weights became mandatory, to April 1962, when all remaining systems were banned. The Indian model was extremely successful and was copied over much of the developing world. Two industrialized Commonwealth countries, Australia and New Zealand, also did a quick conversion to metric.

The phase-in way is to pass a law permitting the use of metric units in parallel with traditional ones, followed by education of metric units, then progressively ban the use of the older measures. This has generally been a slow route to metric. The United Kingdom legalised metric units for contracts and dealings in 1864 and for trade in 1897, but the changeover was not completed in most Commonwealth countries other than India and Australia until the 1970s and 1980s, when governments took an active role in metric conversion. In the United Kingdom and Canada, the process is still incomplete. Japan also followed this route and did not complete the changeover for 70 years. By law, loose goods sold with reference to units of quantity have to be weighed and sold using the metric system. Imperial units shown alongside metric were due to become unlawful after 2009, but the time limit was removed and they may now be used indefinitely.

The third method is to redefine traditional units in terms of metric values. These redefined "quasi-metric" units often stay in use long after metrication is said to have been completed. Resistance to metrication in post-revolutionary France convinced Napoleon to revert to mesures usuelles (usual measures), and, to some extent, the names remain throughout Europe. Portugal did the same in 1814, substituting traditional Portuguese names for the metric units, as described above. In the Netherlands, 500 g is informally referred to as a pond (pound) and 100 g as an ons (ounce), and in Germany and France, 500 g is informally referred to respectively as ein Pfund and une livre ("one pound").

In Denmark, the re-defined pund (500 g) is occasionally used, particularly among older people and (older) fruit growers, since these were originally paid according to the number of pounds of fruit produced. In Sweden and Norway, a mil (Scandinavian mile) is informally equal to 10 km, and this has continued to be the predominantly used unit in conversation when referring to geographical distances. In the 19th century, Switzerland had a non-metric system completely based on metric terms (e.g. 1 Fuss (foot) = 30 cm, 1 Zoll (inch) = 3 cm, 1 Linie (line) = 3 mm). In China, the jin now has a value of 500 g and the liang is 50 g.

Surveys are performed by various interest groups or the government to determine the degree to which ordinary people change to using metric in their daily lives. In countries that have recently changed, older segments of the population tend still to use the older units.

== Sectors and countries resistant to metrication ==
Although the metric system predominates worldwide, non-metric units remain in use in certain industries, products and countries. Their continued use is often associated with established technical standards, compatibility with existing equipment, commercial conventions and consumer familiarity. In some sectors, metric and non-metric units are used alongside one another, while in others, traditional unit names are retained even when the underlying measurements are defined in metric terms.

The extent of metrication varies considerably between countries and industries. Some countries have adopted metric units for most official and commercial purposes while continuing to use non-metric measurements in particular sectors or in everyday life.

=== Sectors retaining non-metric units ===
The following are common areas across metric countries that have demonstrated resistance to metrication.

==== Computing, electronics and photography ====
Map of the world showing adoption of paper sizes, according to the Common Locale Data Repository in 2017 ISO A4 exclusively ISO A4 primarily US-Letter primarily US-Letter predominantly US-Letter exclusively

The computing, electronics and photographic industries continue to use several inch-based measurements, often because of established international standards.

- Dots per inch (DPI) and pixels per inch (PPI) are commonly used to describe printing and display resolution.
- Data density in magnetic tape data storage is commonly expressed in bits per inch for linear density and bits per square inch for areal density.
- Display sizes for televisions, computer monitors and other electronic screens are usually advertised by their diagonal measurement in inches, including in countries that otherwise use metric units.
- The commonly used pin spacing of electronic components is 0.1 in (2.54 mm).

Photography and printing also retain some inch-based conventions. Photographic paper and prints are commonly available in sizes derived from inches, such as 4 × 6 and 8 × 10 inches, including in metric countries.

Paper formats differ internationally. Most countries use the metric-based ISO 216 series, including A4, while US Letter remains the predominant office paper format in the United States and is also widely used in Canada.

==== Engineering and industrial standards ====
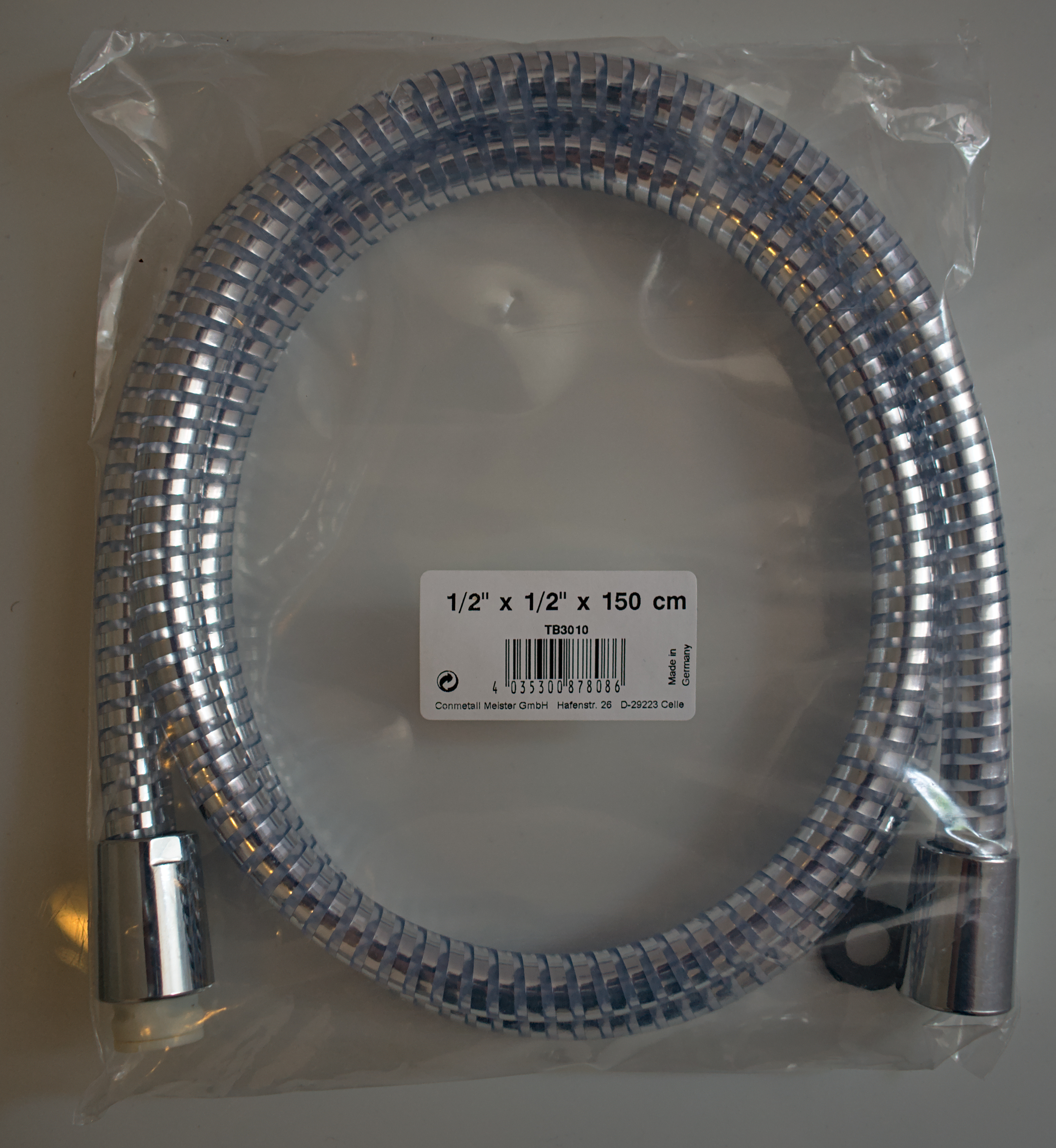
A shower hose sold in Germany with a metric length of 150 cm and nominal 1/2-inch fittings.

Certain engineering and manufacturing applications retain inch-based dimensions because of established standards and the need for compatibility with existing components.

- Photograph and video cameras commonly use 1/4-20 and 3/8-16 tripod mounting screw threads, with dimensions specified in inches under ISO 1222:2010.
- In plumbing, pipes and fittings may retain nominal inch-based designations, including those using British Standard Pipe (BSP) threads, even when their actual dimensions are specified in millimetres.
- Inch-based fasteners and replacement parts remain necessary for maintaining machinery and equipment manufactured to older or non-metric standards, particularly American-made machinery.

These conventions do not necessarily mean that the entire product or industry uses non-metric measurements. For example, plumbing fittings may retain nominal inch sizes while pipe lengths and other specifications are expressed in metric units.

==== Consumer goods and traditional measurements ====
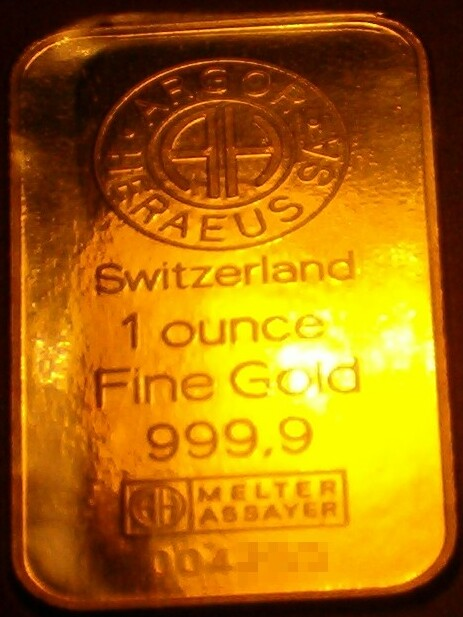
Precious metals, such as gold, are often measured in troy ounces.

A variety of consumer products retain traditional units or measurement conventions, even in countries where metric units are otherwise standard.

- Shoe sizes are commonly expressed using traditional numbering systems rather than directly indicating foot length in centimetres. British and American shoe sizes are based on the barleycorn, while continental European sizes use the Paris point, which is equivalent to 2/3 of a centimetre.
- The fill power of down feather insulation is commonly expressed in cubic inches per ounce, indicating the volume occupied by a given mass of down.
- Fabric thread count is often expressed using a one-square-inch reference area, with the number derived from the warp and weft threads counted along the sides of that area. Some countries and manufacturers use metric-based alternatives.
- Precious metals, including gold, silver and platinum, are commonly traded or marketed in troy ounces internationally, although metric units are also used.

Some consumer products retain names derived from non-metric measurements without necessarily being sold by those units. For example, McDonald's continues to market the Quarter Pounder in many metric countries, although the name refers to the nominal pre-cooked weight of the beef patty rather than the measurement system used for retail transactions.

Traditional measures also survive in the sale of alcoholic beverages. In Australia, draught beer is commonly ordered using historical glass-size names such as pint, schooner and middy, although serving volumes are expressed in millilitres. A pint is commonly approximately 570 mL, whereas in South Australia a glass called a pint is generally 425 mL.

==== Sports and recreation ====
Traditional measurements remain common in several sports and recreational activities.

- Golf course distances are predominantly expressed in yards in the United States, United Kingdom, Ireland, Canada, Mexico, Japan, South Korea and several other countries, including China, India, the Philippines, the United Arab Emirates and Vietnam. In contrast, metres are generally used in continental Europe, Australia, New Zealand, South Africa, Singapore and Malaysia. International golf competitions may provide distances in both systems.
- Surfboards are commonly designed, manufactured and sold using feet and inches for length, width and thickness, including in otherwise metric countries such as Australia.

==== Property and land measurements ====
Non-metric and traditional units remain common in property markets, particularly for describing the area of residential and commercial premises.

- In Hong Kong, Singapore, Malaysia, Canada and India, floor area is commonly advertised in square feet, although metric units may also be used.
- In India and Bangladesh, land and property areas may also be described in square yards.
- In Japan, the traditional tsubo remains a familiar unit of property area alongside square metres.
- In Taiwan, the ping remains widely used in property listings and transactions, with one ping equivalent to approximately 3.306 square metres.
- In South Korea, the pyeong remains familiar in everyday descriptions of property size, although square metres are required in official property documents and advertising. Restrictions on the commercial use of pyeong were introduced from 2007 and progressively extended to other forms of advertising.

==== Road transport and fuel ====
Speed limit units on traffic signs around the world: Kilometres per hour (km/h) Miles per hour (mph) Both No speed limit units

Units used for the retail sale of gasoline: Litre US gallon Imperial gallon No data

Road transport uses a mixture of metric and non-metric measurements internationally. Although kilometres and kilometres per hour predominate, miles and miles per hour remain in official use in the United States, United Kingdom and several Caribbean jurisdictions.

Non-metric measurements also remain common in vehicle specifications:

- Tyre pressure is frequently expressed in pounds per square inch (psi), including in countries that otherwise use metric units. Kilopascals and bars are also widely used.
- Motor vehicle wheel diameters are commonly designated in inches, while tyre widths are generally given in millimetres. Bicycle wheel sizing also retains traditional inch-based designations, alongside metric dimensions specified by international standards.
- Engine power is often expressed in horsepower rather than kilowatts. In German-speaking countries and many former Soviet countries, the commonly used unit is metric horsepower (PS), rather than imperial mechanical horsepower. Within the European Union, horsepower may be displayed as a supplementary unit alongside kilowatts.

Fuel is predominantly sold by the litre internationally, but gallons remain in use in several countries and territories. The United States sells road fuel in US gallons, as do a number of countries in Central America and the Caribbean, including Belize and Colombia. Some Caribbean countries and British Overseas Territories retain imperial gallons. The United States territory of Puerto Rico uses litres rather than US gallons.

Because the US and imperial gallons represent different volumes, their continued use also results in differences between countries that describe fuel quantities using the same unit name.

==== Aviation and maritime transport ====
International aviation and maritime transport retain several non-SI units as part of their established navigation systems.

The nautical mile is widely used to measure distances at sea and in the air. Historically associated with one minute of latitude along a meridian, it is now defined as exactly 1,852 metres. The corresponding unit of speed is the knot, equal to one nautical mile per hour. Neither is an SI unit.

In aviation, altitude and flight levels are commonly expressed in feet, while some countries use metres. The International Civil Aviation Organization (ICAO) advocates worldwide standardisation on SI units but permits the continued use of certain non-SI units, including feet for altitude and nautical miles and knots for navigation.

Despite these exceptions, much of aviation has undergone metrication. Runway lengths are generally expressed in metres, and meteorological reports use degrees Celsius for temperature. The United States adopted Celsius for temperature reporting in the METAR format in 1996.

Metric units are also widely used for aircraft cargo masses, dimensions and fuel quantities. However, practices vary between countries and operators. China uses metric altitude measurements in aviation, while Russia uses feet for flight levels above the transition level. Sailplanes commonly use metric measurements in several European countries.

In maritime transport, the International Maritime Organization (IMO) adopted Resolution A.351(IX) in 1975, calling for SI units to be used in future amendments to the International Convention for the Safety of Life at Sea and other IMO instruments. Nevertheless, nautical miles and knots remain standard units for maritime navigation.

=== Countries retaining widespread non-metric use ===
While many non-metric conventions are international, their use in everyday life, commerce and government differs considerably between countries. The United Kingdom, United States, Canada and Belize are among the countries where customary or imperial units continue to coexist with metric measurements.

==== United Kingdom ====
The United Kingdom has adopted the metric system for most trade and commercial transactions but continues to use imperial units in specific regulated activities and everyday life.

Goods sold by weight or measure generally must be labelled and sold using metric units. Imperial quantities may be displayed alongside metric quantities, provided the metric indication is more prominent. Exceptions include draught beer and cider sold by the pint, milk in returnable containers sold by the pint, and precious metals traded by the troy ounce.

Imperial units remain in official use for road transport. Distances on road signs are expressed in miles and yards, while speed limits are given in miles per hour. New cars must also display fuel consumption figures in both miles per gallon and litres per 100 kilometres.

In everyday usage, feet and inches remain common for personal height, while stones and pounds are frequently used for body weight. Miles are widely used for longer distances, although metric units are common for many other measurements.

Public attitudes reflect this mixture of systems. In a 2022 government consultation, 81.1% of responses favoured maintaining metric units as the primary measurement system while allowing supplementary imperial indications; 17.6% preferred metric units exclusively. In a 2023 YouGov poll, 62% opposed replacing miles with kilometres for road signs and speed limits, while 22% supported the change.

==== United States ====
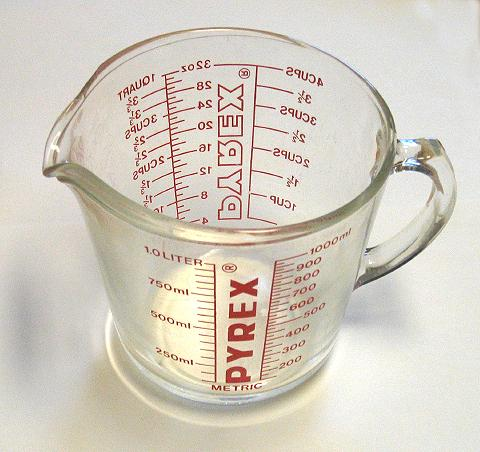
A measuring cup manufactured in the United States, circa 1980, featuring both metric and US customary graduations.

The United States continues to use United States customary units extensively in everyday life, commerce and government, although the metric system is widely used in scientific, medical, military and industrial applications.

The metric system was legalised for use in the United States by the Metric Act of 1866, and the country became a founding signatory of the Metre Convention in 1875.

The Metric Conversion Act of 1975 established a federal policy encouraging voluntary metrication. In 1988, the Omnibus Trade and Competitiveness Act amended the legislation to designate the metric system as the preferred system of weights and measures for United States trade and commerce, and directed federal agencies to adopt metric measurements where economically feasible.

Efforts to introduce metric road signage during the 1990s encountered resistance, and metrication of highway signs remained voluntary. Some state transportation departments subsequently reverted from metric to US customary measurements in highway design and construction.

A 1992 amendment to the Fair Packaging and Labeling Act, implemented in 1994, required many federally regulated consumer products to display quantities in both metric and US customary units. Consequently, dual-unit labelling is common on packaged goods.

Despite the longstanding federal policy favouring metrication, US customary units remain predominant in many aspects of American public and commercial life, including road distances, speed limits, fuel sales, property measurements and consumer products.

==== Canada ====
Canada uses the metric system for most official purposes, including road distances, speed limits, weather reporting and the retail sale of fuel. Nevertheless, imperial and US customary measurements remain common in several areas of everyday life and commerce.

Traditional units are frequently used for personal height and weight, building materials, property measurements and certain consumer products.

Canadian regulations generally require metric declarations of quantity on packaged goods but permit supplementary non-metric measurements. Where both are displayed, the metric quantity must be given first. When US rather than Canadian or imperial liquid units are used, the distinction must be made clear to avoid misleading consumers.

==== Belize ====
Belize, a former British colony, continues to use a mixture of metric and non-metric measurements. Miles remain commonly used for road distances, while petrol is sold in US gallons, reflecting the country's use of both British and American measurement conventions.

== Metrication mishaps ==
Confusion over units during the process of metrication can sometimes lead to accidents. In 1983, an Air Canada Boeing 767, nicknamed the "Gimli Glider" following the incident, ran out of fuel in midflight. The incident was caused, in a large part, by the confusion over the conversion between litres, kilograms, and pounds, resulting in the aircraft receiving 22300 pounds (10100 kg) of fuel instead of the required 22300 kilograms (49200 lb).

While not strictly an example of national metrication, the use of two different measurement systems was a contributing factor in the loss of the Mars Climate Orbiter in 1999. The National Aeronautics and Space Administration (NASA) specified metric units in the contract. NASA and other organisations worked in metric units, but one subcontractor, Lockheed Martin, provided thruster performance data to the team in pound force-seconds instead of newton-seconds. The spacecraft was intended to orbit Mars at about 150 kilometres (93 mi) in altitude, but the incorrect data meant that it descended to about 57 kilometres (35 mi). As a result, it burned up in the Martian atmosphere.

== See also ==
- Conversion of units
- Decimalisation
- History of the metric system
- Language reform
- Metre Convention
- Metric engine (American expression)
- Metrication opposition
- Preferred numbers
- Spread of the Latin script
