= Outline of the metric system =

Overview of and topical guide to the metric system

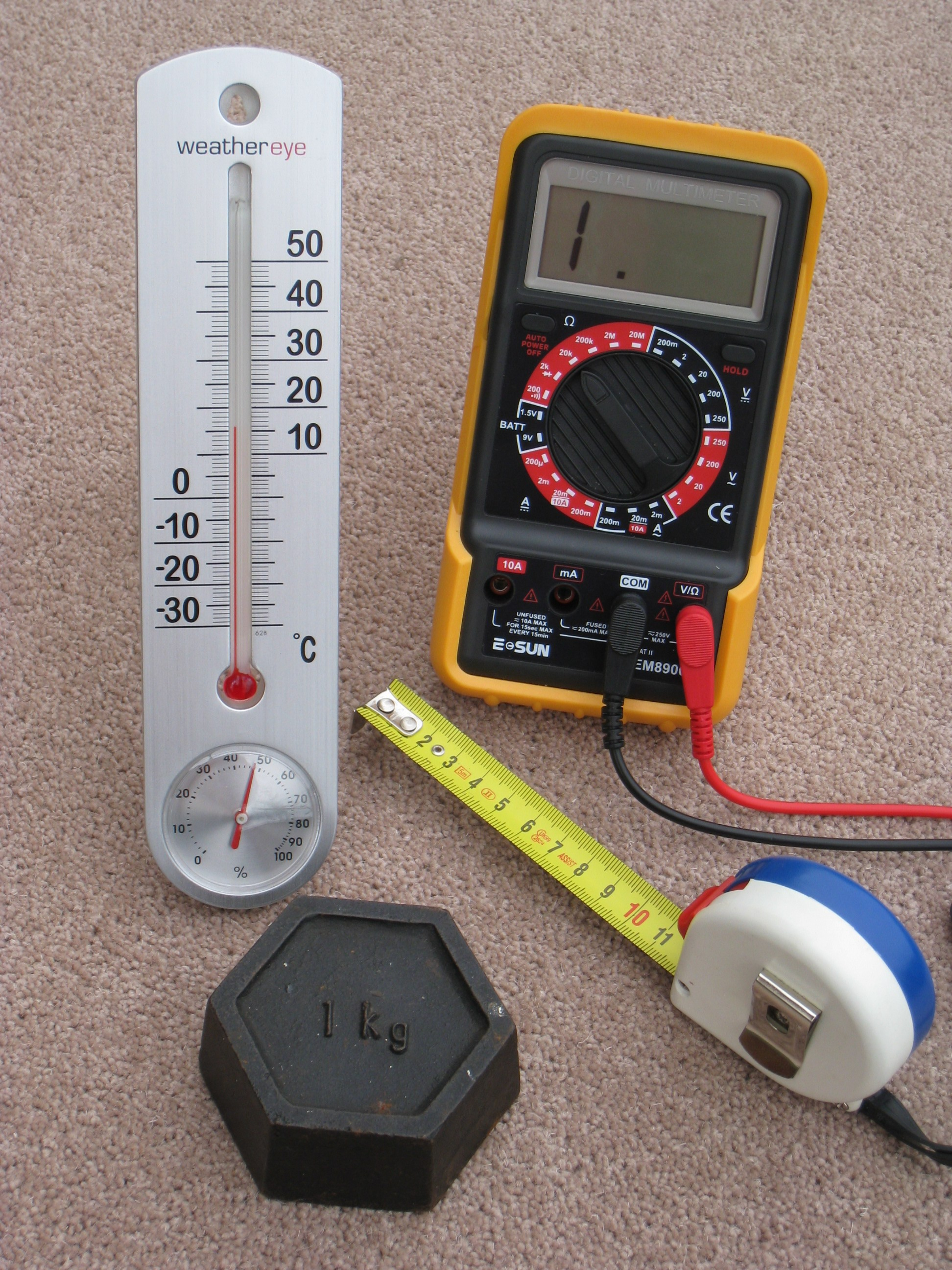
"The metric system is for all people for all time." (Condorcet 1791) Four objects used in making measurements in everyday situations that have metric calibrations are shown: a tape measure calibrated in centimetres, a thermometer calibrated in degrees Celsius, a kilogram mass, and an electrical multimeter which measures volts, amps and ohms.

The following outline is provided as an overview of and topical guide to the metric system:

Metric system – various loosely related systems of measurement that trace their origin to the decimal system of measurement introduced in France during the French Revolution.

== Nature of the metric system ==
The metric system can be described as all of the following:

- System – set of interacting or interdependent components forming an integrated whole.
  - System of measurement – set of units which can be used to specify anything which can be measured. Historically, systems of measurement were initially defined and regulated to support trade and internal commerce. Units were arbitrarily defined by fiat (see statutory law) by the ruling entities and were not necessarily well inter-related or self-consistent. When later analyzed and scientifically, some quantities were designated as base units, meaning all other needed units of measure could be derived from them.

=== Essence of the metric system ===
- International System of Units (SI) is the system of units that has been officially endorsed under the Metre Convention since 1960. Child articles are:
  - SI base unit
  - SI derived unit
  - Non-SI units mentioned in the SI
  - Metric prefixes

=== Underlying philosophy ===
Discussions of the underlying philosophy of the metric system (and other systems of measure) include:

- Coherence (units of measurement)
- Realisation (metrology)

== Metric units of measure ==
Articles that exist for many metric units of measure are catalogued below.

Unit name	Quantity	SI unit	cgs unit	Other metric	Non-metric
abampere	electric current		Derived metric unit with a special name		
abcoulomb	electric charge		Derived metric unit with a special name		
abhenry	inductance		Derived metric unit with a special name		
abohm	electrical resistance		Derived metric unit with a special name		
abvolt	potential difference		Derived metric unit with a special name		
ampere	electric current	Base unit			
ampere-meter	magnetic pole strength	Derived coherent SI unit without a special name			
apostilb	luminance		Derived metric unit with a special name		
astronomical unit	length	Non-SI unit permitted for use with SI units			
dalton	mass	Non-SI unit permitted for use with SI units			
barye	pressure		Derived metric unit with a special name		
becquerel	radioactive activity	Derived SI unit with a special name			
bril	luminance				No specified relationship
candela	luminous intensity	Base unit			
candela per square metre	luminance	Derived coherent SI unit without a special name			
centimetre	length	Multiple or submultiple of an SI base unit	Base unit		
coulomb	electric charge	Derived SI unit with a special name			
cubic centimetre	volume	Derived coherent SI unit without a special name	Derived coherent metric unit without a special name		
cubic metre	volume	Derived coherent SI unit without a special name	Derived coherent metric unit without a special name		
cubic metre per second	volumetric flow rate	Derived coherent SI unit without a special name	Derived coherent metric unit without a special name		
curie	radioactive activity		Derived metric unit with a special name		
day	time	Non-SI unit permitted for use with SI units			
decibel	level	Non-SI unit permitted for use with SI units			
degree Celsius	temperature	Derived SI unit with a special name			
degree of arc	angle	Non-SI unit permitted for use with SI units			
dyne	force		Derived metric unit with a special name		
electronvolt	energy	Non-SI unit permitted for use with SI units			
erg	energy		Derived metric unit with a special name		
farad	capacitance	Derived SI unit with a special name			
gal	acceleration		Derived SI unit with a special name		
gauss	magnetic flux density		Derived metric unit with a special name		
gram	mass	Multiple or submultiple of an SI base unit	Base unit		
grave	mass			Base unit	
gray	absorbed dose	Derived SI unit with a special name			
hectare	area	Non-SI unit permitted for use with SI units		Multiple or submultiple of a base unit	
henry	inductance	Derived SI unit with a special name			
hertz	frequency	Derived SI unit with a special name	Derived metric unit with a special name		
hour	time	Non-SI unit permitted for use with SI units			No specified relationship
joule	energy	Derived SI unit with a special name			
joule per mole	energy per amount of substance	Derived coherent SI unit without a special name			
joule-second	angular momentum	Derived coherent SI unit without a special name			
katal	catalytic activity	Derived SI unit with a special name			
kelvin	temperature	Base unit	Base unit		
kilogram	mass	Base unit	Multiple or submultiple of a base unit		
kilogram per cubic metre	density	Derived coherent SI unit without a special name	Derived coherent metric unit without a special name		
kilometre per hour	velocity				No specified relationship
litre	volume	Non-SI unit permitted for use with SI units		Multiple or submultiple of a base unit	
lumen	luminous flux	Derived SI unit with a special name			
lumen second	luminous energy	Derived coherent SI unit without a special name			
lux	illuminance	Derived SI unit with a special name			
lux second	luminous exposure	Derived coherent SI unit without a special name			
maxwell	magnetic flux		Derived metric unit with a special name		
metre per second squared	acceleration	Derived coherent SI unit without a special name	Derived coherent metric unit without a special name		
metre squared per second	angular momentum	Derived coherent SI unit without a special name	Derived coherent metric unit without a special name		
metre	length	Base unit	Multiple or submultiple of a base unit		
microgram	mass	Multiple or submultiple of an SI base unit	Multiple or submultiple of a base unit		
minute	time	Non-SI unit permitted for use with SI units			No specified relationship
minute of arc	angle	Non-SI unit permitted for use with SI units			
mole	amount of substance	Base unit			
neper	level	Non-SI unit permitted for use with SI units			
newton	force	Derived SI unit with a special name			
newton-metre	torque	Derived SI metric unit without a special name			
newton-second	impulse or momentum	Derived coherent SI unit without a special name			
oersted	magnetic field strength		Derived SI unit with a special name		
ohm	electric resistance	Derived SI unit with a special name			
pascal	pressure	Derived SI unit with a special name			
phot	illuminance		Derived coherent metric unit without a special name		
poise	dynamic viscosity		Derived metric unit with a special name		
radian	angle	Derived coherent SI unit with a special name			
radian per second	angular frequency	Derived coherent SI unit without a special name			
rayleigh	photon flux			No specified relationship	
roentgen	kerma of X-rays and gamma rays		Derived coherent metric unit without a special name		
roentgen equivalent man	radiation dose equivalent		Derived coherent metric unit without a special name		
second	time	Base unit	Base unit		
siemens	electric conductance	Derived SI unit with a special name			
sievert	radiation dose equivalent	Derived SI unit with a special name			
skot	luminance			No specified relationship	
square kilometre	area	Derived SI unit without a special name	Derived coherent metric unit without a special name		
square metre	area	Derived coherent SI unit without a special name	Derived coherent metric unit without a special name		
statcoulomb	electric charge		Derived metric unit with a special name		
statvolt	potential difference		Derived metric unit with a special name		
steradian	solid angle	Derived coherent SI unit with a special name			
stilb	luminance		Derived coherent metric unit without a special name		
stokes	kinematic viscosity		Derived metric unit with a special name		
tesla	magnetic field strength	Derived SI unit with a special name			
tonne	mass	Non-SI unit permitted for use with SI units		Multiple or submultiple of a base unit	
torr	pressure			No specified relationship	
volt	potential difference	Derived SI unit with a special name			
watt	power	Derived SI unit with a special name			
watt-second	energy	Derived coherent SI unit without a special name			
weber	magnetic flux	Derived SI unit with a special name			

== History of the metric system ==
History of the metric system – the metric system developed from a decimal system of measurement adopted by France after the French Revolution.

=== Chronological history of the metric system ===
Principal dates in the development of the metric system include:

- 1792 – Initiation of a decimal system of measurement by the French Revolutionary Government
- 1799 – The Metre des archives and kilogram des archives become the standards for the metric system.
- 1861 – Concept of unit coherence introduced by Maxwell – the base units were the centimetre, gram and second.
- 1875 – Under the Convention of the metre, a new body the General Conference on Weights and Measures (CGPM) was set up and given responsibility for the new international prototype of the kilogram and international prototype of the metre which replaced the old French copies as the definitive prototypes of the metre and the kilogram.
- 1881 – International Electric Congress agrees on standards for electrical units (formalised in 1893)
- 1921 – Convention of the metre extended to cover all physical units of measure
- 1960 – The CGPM published the metric system under the name "International System of Units" (SI) a coherent system of units based on the kilogram, metre, second, ampere and kelvin.

=== History of metrication ===
Countries using the metric, imperial and US customary systems as of 2019.

History of metrication – metrication is the process by which legacy, national-specific systems of measurement were replaced by the metric system.

- Metrication in Australia
- Metrication in Barbados
- Metrication in Canada
- Metrication in Chile
- Metrication in Guatemala
- Metrication in Hong Kong
- Metrication in India
- Metrication in Ireland
- Metrication in Jamaica
- Metrication in New Zealand
- Metrication in Peru
- Metrication in Sweden
- Metrication in the United Kingdom
  - British Metrication Board
- Metrication in the United States
  - Plan for Establishing Uniformity in the USA, Thomas Jefferson's report (1790) which included a proposal for decimal system based on a "decimal foot"
  - United States Metric Board

=== Historical metric system variants ===
Four variants of the metric system that predate the introduction of SI (1960) are described in varying levels of detail:

- MKS system of units formed the basis for SI.
- Centimetre–gram–second system of units was the principal variant of the metric system that evolved in stages until it was superseded by SI.
- Gravitational metric system was a little-used variant of the metric system that normalised the acceleration due to gravity.
- Metre–tonne–second system of units was a variant of the metric system used in French and Russian industry between the First and Second World Wars.

Between 1812 and 1839 France used a quasi-metric system:

- Mesures usuelles

=== History of metric units ===
- History of the metre

== Politics of the metric system ==
Prior to 1875 the metric system was controlled by the French Government. In that year, seventeen nations signed the Metre Convention and the management and administration of the system passed into international control.

- Metre Convention describes the 1875 treaty and its development to the modern day. Three organisations, the CGPM, CIPM and BIPM were set up under the convention.
- General Conference on Weights and Measures (Conférence générale des poids et mesures or CGPM) – a meeting every four to six years of delegates from all member states.
- The International Committee for Weights and Measures (Comité international des poids et mesures or CIPM) – an advisory body to the CGPM consisting of prominent metrologists.
- The International Bureau of Weights and Measures (Bureau international des poids et mesures or BIPM) – an organisation based at Sèvres, France that has custody of the international prototype of the kilogram, provides metrology services for the CGPM and CIPM, houses the secretariat for these organisations and hosts their formal meetings.

Both the European Union and the International Organization for Standardization have issued directives/recommendations to harmonise the use of units of measure. These documents endorse the use of SI for most purposes.

- European units of measurement directives
- ISO/IEC 80000

== Future of the metric system ==
- 2019 revision of the SI – changes in the definitions of the International System of Units, which are based on defined values of physical constants, in use since May 2019.

== Metrication groups and authorities ==
- US Metric Association (USA, 1916–current)
- Metric Commission (Canada, 1971–1985)
- Metrication Board (United Kingdom, 1969–1981)

== Metric system publications ==
- Plan for Establishing Uniformity in the Coinage, Weights, and Measures of the United States text (Thomas Jefferson 1790)

== Persons influential in the metric system ==
- Simon Stevin (1548–1620)
- Gabriel Mouton (1618–1694)
- Marquis de Condorcet (1743–1794)
- Pierre Méchain (1744–1804)
- Pierre-Simon Laplace (1749–1827)
- Jean Baptiste Joseph Delambre (1749–1822)
- Adrien-Marie Legendre (1753–1834)
- James Clerk Maxwell (1831–1879)
- William Thomson, 1st Baron Kelvin (1824–1907)
- Giovanni Giorgi (1871–1950)

== See also ==
- Imperial units
