= Peruvian units of measurement =

Units of measurement used in Peru

A number of units of measurement were used in Peru to measure length, mass, area, etc. The metric system adopted in 1862 and has been compulsory since 1869 in Peru.

== System before metric system ==
Units from Spanish Castilian were used.

=== Length ===
One vara was equal to 0.83598 m. One pie was equal to 0.27866 m/3 varas.

=== Mass ===
Several units were used to measure mass. One libra was equal to 0.46009 kg. Some other units are given below:

1 arroba = 25 libra

1 quintal = 100 libra

1 fanega = 140 libra.

=== Area ===
One topo was equal to 2706 m^{2}. One fanegada was equal to 6459.6 m^{2}.

== See also ==
- Metrication in Peru
