= Argentine units of measurement =

Units of measurement used in Argentina

A number of different units of measurement were used in Argentina as its national system was derived from Castilian Spanish. The metric system was legally optional since 1863 and has been compulsory since 1887.

== Pre-metric units ==
A number of different units were used before 1887.

=== Length ===
A number of different units were used to measure length. These units varied from one province or city to another. In the province of Buenos Aires, one vara (yard) was 0.8666 m. Some other units used in the province of Buenos Aires are given below:

1 línea (line) = 1/432 vara

1 pulgada (inch) = 1/86 vara

1 palma (palm) = 1/4 vara

1 pié (foot) = 1/3 vara

1 braza (fathom) = 2 vara

1 cuadra (block) = 150 vara

1 legua (league) = 6000 vara.

==== Railway measures ====
There were some other units used on the railways. One legua was equal to 600 varas (0.3231 mile). One milla was equal to 1.85 km (1.149 miles)

=== Mass ===
Different units were used to measure mass. These units were vary from one province or city to another and, in the province of Buenos Aires, one libra (pound) was equal to 459.4 g while one "Libra de Farmacia" (apothecary pound) was equal to 3/4 libra or 344.5 g. Some other units in the province of Buenos Aires are provided below:

1 lb (Argentine Confederation libra) = 1.0127142432 lb (US pound 1893) = 1.01271544757245 lb (Avoirdupois) = 0.45936 kg

1 grano (grain) = 1/9216 libra

1 adarme (dram) = 1/256 libra

1 onza (ounce) = 1/16 libra

1 arroba = 25 libra

1 quintal (hundredweight) = 100 libra

1 tonelada (ton) = 2000 libra.

The marco used for gold and silver was equal to 3544.4 grains.

=== Capacity ===
Dry and liquid units were used for capacity. These units varied from one province or city to another.

==== Dry ====
1 fanega = 137.1977 l

1 Cuartilla = 1/4 Fanega

1 Tonelada = 7 Fanega

1 Lastre = 12 Fanega.

=== Liquid ===
Units included:

1 Frasco (gallon) = 2.375 l

1 Octava (pint) = 1/8 Frasco

1 Cuarta (quart) = 1/4 Frasco

1 Baril (barrel) = 32 Frasco

1 Cuerta = 48 Frasco

1 Pipa = 192 Frasco.

== Units after metric adoption ==
Although theoretically the metric system was compulsory, a survey in 1920 revealed the widespread use of both traditional Spanish units and US customary units (particularly in trade with the US).
