= Greek units of measurement =

Traditional units of measurement used in modern Greece

Traditional Greek units of measurement were standardized and used in modern Greece before and alongside the adoption of the metric system in 1836. Metric units were finally made legally compulsory in 1922.

== Units used before the metric system ==
=== Length ===
One piki varied from 0.640 m to 0.670 m.

1 pic was equal to 1 piki.

The small piki of Constantinople (also known as the endeze) was equal to 0.648 m

The large piki of Constantinople (also known as the arsin) was equal to 0.669 m

A masonry piki (also known as the meimar zire) was equal to 0.750 m.

Two types of piki were used to measure cloth. The measurement for silks was equal to 25 inches, and for linen and woolens it was equal to 27 inches. The piki was sometimes regarded as equal to a metre and a kilometre was called a stadion.

The metre was introduced in a royal decree of 1836, and was originally subdivided in 10 palms, 100 digits and 1000 lines.

=== Mass ===
Units used to measure mass were:

1 dramme = 3.2 g

1 livre (also known as a pound) (Venetian) = 450 g

1 mina = 1.5 kg

1 royal mine 1.5 kg

1 oka = 0.85331 royal mine = 1.280 kg =

1 stater = 56.32 kg

1 talanton = 150 kg.

One cantaro was equal to 44 oke, but the value varied from 112 to 128 lb depending on locality. One tseki was 176 oka in Istanbul and 136 oka in Thessaloniki.

=== Area ===
One stremma was equal to 1000 m^{2}. The hectare varied from 900 - 2500 m^{2} depending on region.

=== Capacity ===
Units used to measure capacity include:

1 oka = 1.333 to 1.340 litres

1 baril = 74.236 litres.

A staro was equal to 3 bachels, and was also equal to 2.54835 bushels.
