= Mexican units of measurement =

Units of measurement used in Mexico

A number of units of measurement were used in Mexico to measure length, mass, area, capacity, etc. The metric system was optional from 1857, and has been compulsory since 1896.

== System before metric system ==
The units of the system (from Spanish, Castilian) were legally defined during the transition period of the metric system.

== Length ==
A number of units were used. One vara (lit. "pole", "yard") was equal to 0.838 m (32.99 inches) as it was legally defined also use inches and feet. Some other units and legal equivalents are given below:

1 linea (lit. "line") = 1/432 vara

1 pulgada (lit. "thumbful", "inch") = 1/36 vara

1 pie (lit. "foot") = 1/3 vara

1 milla (lit. "mile") = 5000 pies

1 legua (lit. "league") = 5000 varas.

== Mass ==
A number of units were used. One libra (lit. "pound") was equal to 0.46024634 kg as it was legally defined. Some other units and legal equivalents are given below:

1 tomin = 1/768 libra

1 adarme = 1/256 libra

1 ochava ("eighth") = 1/128 libra

1 onza ("ounce") = 1/16 libra

1 arroba = 25 libras

1 quintal ("hundredweight") = 100 libras

1 terco = 160 libras

== Area ==
A number of units were used. One fanega was equal to 35662.8 m^{2} as it was legally defined. Some other units and legal equivalents are given below:

1 caballeria = 12 fanegas

1 labor = 18 fanegas

1 sitio = 492.28 fanegas.

== Capacity ==
Two systems, dry and liquid, were used.

=== Dry ===
Several units were used. One cuartillo (lit. "quart") was equal to 1.8918 L as it was legally defined. Some other units and legal equivalents are given below:

1 almud ("gallon") = 4 cuartillos

1 fanega = 48 cuartillos

1 carga = 96 cuartillos.

=== Liquid ===
Several units were used. Some units and legal equivalents are given below:

1 cuartillo (for wine) = 0.456264 L

1 cuartillo (for oil) = 0.506162 L

1 jarra = 18 cuartillos.

One frasco was equal to 2 1/2 quarts, and one baril was equal to 20 gallons, with local variations.
