= Okka =

Okka means various things:

- For the Ottoman unit of weight, see Oka (measure)
- For the water-pipe, see Hookah

It might also refer to:

- Okka Rau (born 1977), German beach volleyball player
- Okka Disk, an American jazz record label
