= Uruguayan units of measurement =

A number of units of measurement were used in Uruguay to measure quantities. Metric system was optional in Uruguay since 1866, and has been compulsory since 1894.

== System before metric system ==
The older system was the Spanish (Castilian) system with some modification.

=== Mass ===
One libra was equal to 460 g (1.014286 lb).

=== Capacity ===
One fanega was equal to 274 L (7.776 bushels).
