= History of measurement systems in Pakistan =

Historical units of measurement were standardized and used in the Mughal Empire (1526–1857) used standard measures to determine land holdings and collect land tax as a part of Mughal land reforms. British units of measurement were adopted in South Asia as first the East India Company and later colonial rule gained foothold but were abandoned in Pakistan and officially replaced on October 1967, when the Government of Pakistan adopted the International System of Units (SI).

== History ==
The history of measurement systems in Pakistan begins in early Indus Valley Civilization with the earliest surviving samples dated to the 5th millennium BCE.

== Distance ==
A guz (also spelled gaz, from Persian گز), or Mughal yard, is a unit of length used in parts of Asia. Historically, it was a regionally variable measurement similar to the English yard both in size and in that it was often used for measuring textiles. Values of the guz ranged from 610 to 1,040 millimetres (24 to 41 in) over time. Kos is an ancient unit of distance used in South Asia which is about 3.62 kilometres (2.25 mi). Kos may also refer to about 1.8 km (1.1 mi) or 3.2 km (2.0 mi). The Mughal Empire used Farsang (Parsang) for distance, which was in principle the distance a horse would walk in an hour, about 4.8 kilometres (3 mi) = 12,000 cubits.

== Area ==
A Kanal is a unit of area. Under British rule the Marla and Kanal were standardized so that the Kanal equals exactly 506 square metres (605 sq yd) or 1/8 acre. A Kanal is equal to 20 marlas. The Marla is a traditional unit of area that was used in Pakistan and Marla was standardized under British rule to be equal to the square rod, or 272.25 square feet, 30.25 square yards, or 25.2928 square metres. As such, it was exactly one 1/160 of an Acre.

== Time ==
Paher, is a traditional unit of time used in South Asia, including Pakistan. One pahar nominally equals three hours, and there are eight pahars in a day. The timing of Salat (Namaz) were also used to measure time of the day.

Salat	Time
Fajr (فجر)	Dawn to sunrise, should be ready at least 10–15 minutes before sunrise
Zuhr (ظهر)	After true noon until Asr
Asr (عصر)	Afternoon
Maghrib (مغرب)	After sunset until dusk
Isha (عشاء)	Dusk until dawn

== Weight/mass ==
Two systems of weight were in use, an ordinary one in common use, and a British system.

Pakistani System	Urdu	British / troy System	Metric System
1 Tolä	تولہ	≈ 0.375 t oz	11.66375 g
1 Sèr (80 Tolä)	سیر (۸۰ تولہ)	2.5 t lb ≈ 2.057 lb ≈ 2 lb 1 oz	0.93310 kg
1 Maund (40 Sèr)	من (۴۰ سیر)	100 troy lb	37.324 kg

The current definitions as per the UN are:

Pakistani System	Metric System
1 Tolä	11.664 g
1 Sèr (80 Tolä)	933.10 g
1 Maund (40 Sèr)	37.324 kg

== See also ==
- Metrication
