= Paraguayan units of measurement =

A number of units of measurement were used in Paraguay to measure quantities including length, mass, area, capacity, etc. Metric system had been optional since 1890, and adopted since 1899 in Paraguay.

== System before metric system ==
Spanish system was used before metric system.

=== Length ===
A number of units were used to measure length. According to legal equivalents, one vara (old) was 0.83856 m. One cuerda or One cordel was 83 1/3 vara or 69.88 m, according to legal equivalents. One vara was 0.866 m, according to legal equivalents. Some other units and their legal equivalents are given below:

1 pulgada (inch) = 1/36 vara

1 linea (line) = 1/432 vara

1 piede (foot) = 1/3 vara

1 pouce = 1/36 vara

1 ligne = 1/432 vara

1 cuadra = 100 vara

1 lieue (league) = 5000 vara.

== Mass ==
Several units were used to measure mass. According to legal equivalents, One libra was 0.459 kg (One libra (old) was 460.08 kg). Some other units and their legal equivalents were given below:

1 onza (once) = 1/16 libra

1 arroba = 25 libra

1 quintal (hundredweight) = 100 libra

1 tonelada (tonne) = 2000 libra.

== Area ==
Several units were used to measure area. Some units and their legal equalents are given below:

1 lifio (old) = 4883.2 m^{2}

1 lifio = 100 square vara = 75 m^{2}.

== Capacity ==
Two main systems, dry and liquid, were used to measure capacity.

=== Dry ===
One fanega was 288 L and one almude was 1/12 fanega.

=== Liquid ===
Several units were used to measure liquid capacity. One frasco was 3.029 litres. Some other units and their legal equivalents are given below:

1 cuarto = 1/4 frasco

1 baril = 32 frasco

1 pipe = 192 frasco.
