= Obsolete Serbian units of measurement =

A number of units of measurement were used in Serbia to measure length, weight, etc. Metrication was carried out in 1873 in Serbia.

== System before metric system ==
A number of units were used.

=== Length ===
One notable unit was archine. One archine was 28.0 in (0.711 m).

=== Mass ===
Some units of mass are given below:

1 litra = 100 drachm

1 oka = 4 litra = 2.8188 lb = 1.2786 kg.
