= Belgian units of measurement =

Units of measurement used in Belgium

Before it adopted the metric system in 1816, the area that now constitutes Belgium used a number of units of measurement to measure different types of quantities including length, mass, and area. Since 1820, the International System of Units has been compulsory in Belgium. When the metric system began to be used in Belgium, different names were used for some of its units.

== Pre-metric units ==
Before 1820, different units were used in the area that now constitutes Belgium. Belgium became an independent country in 1830.

=== Length ===
One perche was equal to 6.497 metres (21.32 ft). One pied was equal to 1/20 perche.

=== Mass ===
A number of units were used to measure mass in Belgium. One livre was equal to 489.5 grams (17.27 oz). Some other units are provided below:

- 1 loth = 1/32 livre
- 1 once = 1/16 livre
- 1 marc 1/2 livre
- 1 stein = 8 livre
- 1 quintal = 100 livre
- 1 chariot = 165 livre
- 1 balle = 200 livre
- 1 schiffpfund = 300 livre
- 1 charge = 400 livre

=== Area ===
One arpent was equal to 400 square perches (130.6 a)

== Metric units ==
In the starting era of the metric system in Belgium other names were used for metric units, including aune for metre, litron for litre, livre for kilogram, once for hectogram, lood for decigram, and wigtje for gram.
