= Mauritian units of measurement =

Units of measurement used in Mauritius

A number of units of measurement were used in Mauritius. The metric system was adopted in 1876, and has been compulsory in Mauritius since 1878.

== System before metric system ==
Systems including old French and British were used.

=== Capacity ===
In addition to old French and British units, the following were used:

1 cash = 227.11 litre

1 velt = 1/30 cash.
