= Malay units of measurement =

Units of measurement used in Malaysia and neighbouring countries include the kati, a unit of mass, and the gantang, a unit of volume.

== Mass ==
For mass, the catty equals 0.6 kg. Another unit is picul which equals 60 kg.

== Volume ==
The gantang is equivalent to an imperial gallon, or 4.54609 cubic decimetres.

Table of equivalences
Unit	Imperial gallon	Millilitres
kepul	1/16	284.130625
leng	1/8	568.26125
cupak	1/4	1136.5225
gantang	1	4546.09
sukat	4	18184.36
nalih	16	72737.44
kunca	160	727374.4
Note: The millilitre equivalences are exact.
