= Tunisian units of measurement =

Units of measurement used in Tunisia

A number of different units of measurement were used in Tunisia to measure length, mass, capacity, etc. In Tunisia, Metric System has been compulsory since 1895.

== System before the metric system ==
A number of units were used. Some of these units were still used even in the 1920s, for example.

=== Length ===
Several units were used. The unit, pic was used depending on the measuring object. Some of the units are given below:

1 pic Arabic = 0.488 m

1 pic Turc = 0.637 m

1 pic endazé = 0.673 cm.

Dra's hendaseh, for woolen goods, was equal to 26.49 in. Pik for linen was equal to 18.62 in, and pik for silk was equal to 24.83 in.

=== Mass ===
A number of different units were used. One uckir was equal to 31.495 kg. Some other units are given below:

1 rottolo attari = 16 uckir

1 rottolo sucki (for meat, etc.) = 18 uckir

1 rottolo khaddari (for vegetables) = 20 uckir

1 cantaro = 100 uckir (1 cantart (attari) = 100 rottolo attari = 1600;1 cantart (sucki) = 100 rottolo sucki = 1800 unkir;1 cantaro (khaddari) = 100 rottolo attari = 2000 uckir).

According to some sources, one rottolo (rotl) was equal to 1.1175 lb, and rotl sucky for meat, etc. was equal to 1.2582 lb, and one rotl ghredari for vegetables was equal to 1.4098 lb. One metical for gold and silver was equal to 59.7 grains.

=== Capacity ===
Several units were used.

==== Liquid ====
One metter (mitre) was equal to 2.6417 gallon.

==== Dry ====
One cafisso (cafiz) was equal to 496 L, and one millerole (Marseilles) was approximately equal to 64 L. Some other units are given below:

1 saah= 1/128 cafisso

1 whiba = 1/16 cafisso.
