= Metrication in Chile =

Chile adopted the metric system in 1848. Previously, the Spanish system of measures was used.

Since colonization, Chile had always used a unit system based on the Spanish customary units. In 1843, a law was passed formalizing it, and defining its fundamental unit, the vara, as a fraction of a metre.

Later, during the presidency of Manuel Bulnes, a law was passed on 29 January 1848, adopting the Metric System. Finally, Chile signed the Metre Convention in 1908.

== Current exceptions ==
- Timber and pipes are sold in metres, but their width, thickness, and diameter are measured in inches.
- Nail mass is measured in grams, but length is measured in inches.
- Tins of paint are usually sold in multiples of US gallons.
- Display sizes for the screens of televisions and computer monitors have their diagonals measured in inches.
- Tire pressure is measured in pounds per square inch.
- The most common paper size is letter (carta). A4 paper is rarely used.
- The price of copper, Chile's most exported material, is usually quoted in dollars per pound.
- In the Chiloé islands, the almud (a Spanish unit) is used as a volume measurement for "drys" (between six or eight litres).
- McDonald's sells its Quarter Pounder with cheese as "Cuarto de Libra con Queso", which translates from Spanish as "Quarter Pound with Cheese".
- Like in most countries, aviation (altitude and flight level) is measured in feet.
