= Metrication in Peru =

Peru adopted the metric system in 1862, replacing Spanish customary units.

== History ==
In 1862, the Peruvian government decreed the metric system to be official in Peru. However, several years later the old measurements were still used. In 1869, a new law made the metric system compulsory.

In 1875 Peru adhered to the International Bureau of Weights and Measures in Sèvres, France.

The most current law regarding the measuring system is Law 23560 1982.

== Current exceptions ==
Peru, has completed its metrification with a few unique exceptions:

- Coca leaves and potatoes are sometimes still sold in arrobas.
- Gasoline, diesel, and kerosene are sold by the US gallon.
- Nails are sold in inches.

The following are common exceptions in metric countries such as Australia:

- McDonald's sells its Quarter Pounder with cheese as "Cuarto de Libra con Queso", which translates from Spanish as "Quarter Pound with Cheese".
- Aviation (altitude and flight level) is still sometimes measured in feet.
- Display sizes for the screens of TVs and computer monitors may be described as having their diagonals measured in inches instead of or as well as centimetres, e.g., a TV screen may be advertised as 42 in (1,100 mm).
