= Metrication in New Zealand =

Adoption of the metric system of measurements in New Zealand

New Zealand logo of metrication

New Zealand started metrication in 1969 with the establishment of the Metric Advisory Board (MAB) and fully completed metrication on 14 December 1976. Until the 1970s, New Zealand traditionally used the imperial system for measurement, which was due to historically being a colony of the United Kingdom.

== Strategy toward metrication ==
Prior to metrication, the accounting system was decimalised on 10 July 1967, with one dollar equal to one hundred cents, or ten shillings in the pre-decimal system.

The New Zealand metric symbol was introduced in March 1971. To give metrication a human face, a baby girl named Jeannie Preddey became the mascot, known as Little Miss Metric. News and pictures of her progress were intermingled with press releases about the progress of metrication. By the end of 1972, the temperature scale, road signs, and measures used in the sale of such items as wool and milk had been metricated. Only a few letters voiced outright opposition to the changeover.

== Exceptions ==
Although New Zealand completed metrication in 1976, a 1992 study of university students found that at that time, there was a continued use of imperial units for birth weight and human height alongside metric units. On the thirtieth anniversary of the introduction of the metric system in December 2006, the New Zealand Consumer Affairs Minister, Judith Tizard, commented that "Now 30 years on the metric system is part of our daily lives" but noted some continuing use of imperial measurements in some birth announcements of baby weights and also with people's heights.

A few uses of imperial measurements remain, mostly to do with interoperability:

- The aviation industry is one of the last major users of the imperial system: altitude and airport elevation are measured in feet, distances in navigation in nautical miles, and speeds in knots. All other aspects (fuel quantity, aircraft weight, runway length, etc.) use metric.
- Where exact fitting of parts is required, such as between nuts and bolts, or between tyres and wheel rims.
- Since the late-1990s, display sizes for screens on televisions, computer monitors, tablets and mobile phones have reverted to having their diagonals advertised solely in inches; the legality of such advertising has not been tested in court.
