= Algerian units of measurement =

Units of measurement used in Algeria

This is a list of Algerian units of measurement that were used before 1843 for things like length, mass and capacity. After that, Algeria adopted the French system of units (i.e., the metric system).

== Length ==
Before the 1843 changeover, different units were used to measure length. One pic (dzera à torky) was equal either to 0.64 m or 0.623 m), while a different pic (dzera à rabry) was equal to 0.48 m or 0.467 m). Some other units are given below:

1 termin = 1/8 pic

1 rebia = 1/4 pic

1 nus = 1/2 pic.

== Mass ==
A number of different units were used to measure mass. One ukkia (ounce) was equal to 0.03413 kg. One metical (metsquat) was equal to about 0.0047 kg. Some other units are given below:

1 rottolo à thary = 16 ukkia

1 rottolo à khadhary = 18 ukkia

1 rottolo à kebyr = 24 ukkia

1 cantar = 100 rottolo (cantar (kebyr) = 100 rottolo à kebyr, cantar (khaldary) = 100 rottolo à khadhary, and cantar (thary) = 100 rottolo à thary).

In addition to above units, one gyral was equal to 207 mg.

== Capacity ==
Two different systems were used to measure capacity: one for dry measure, and another for liquid measure. Some units used to measure dry capacities are given below:

=== Dry ===
1 caffiso (or calisse) = 317.47 L (Note: in an old publication, one caffiso was equalised to 8 saah, even though the given values are mismatched.)

1 saah (or ssah) = 58 L

1 tarri (or tarie) = 1/12 caffiso.

=== Liquid ===
One khoull (or khoul or kolleh) was equal to 16 2/3 l (1 hectoliter = 6 khoull ) or 16 L. One Metalli (oil) was equal to 17.90 L.
