= Metrication in Guatemala =

In Guatemala the metric system is official but it uses a mixture of U.S., metric and Spanish customary units.

== History ==
In May 1910 most of Central America adopted a common system of measurements.

In May 1921 Guatemala became officially metric.

== Non metric units used today ==
Among the Guatemalan units of measurement some are based on old Spanish units; they include the vara and cuadra linear measurements; the vara cuadrada, the manzana and the cuerda units of area; and the libra, arroba, quintal and garrafón units of weight and volume.

The vara cuadrada or square vara is commonly used in land transactions in Guatemala and 10,000 square varas equal one manzana.

One square vara equals 0.6987 square meters (7.521 sq ft), while one manzana equals 6,987 square metres (1.727 acres).

The term cuerda can refer to areas of different sizes. Cuerdas can refer to areas that are 50 x 50, 40 x 40, 30 x 30, 25 x 25 or 20 x 20 varas (i.e. 2500, 1600, 900, 625, or 400 square varas). In addition, some sources describe a cuerda as 32 x 32 varas. In Guatemala, the linear vara is 0.8421 meters. (The length of vara varies slightly among different Latin American countries.)

- One cuerda of 50 x 50 varas = 1,746.84 square meters (18,802.8 sq ft)
- One cuerda of 40 x 40 varas = 1,117.98 square meters (12,033.8 sq ft)
- One cuerda of 30 x 30 varas = 628.87 square meters (6,769.1 sq ft)
- One cuerda of 25 x 25 varas = 436.71 square meters (4,700.7 sq ft)
- One cuerda of 20 x 20 varas = 279.50 square meters (3,008.5 sq ft)

A Spanish pound (libra) is 460 grams.

=== US Customary Units Used in Guatemala Today ===
Some United States customary units are also used in Guatemala. These include gallons inches, feet, miles, pounds (note the Spanish pound is also used) and ounces.

- Gasoline and diesel fuel are sold by the US gallon.
- Some food items such as meat, sugar and coffee are sold by the pound.
- Display sizes for screens on television sets and computer monitors have their diagonal measured in inches.
- McDonald's sells its Quarter Pounder with cheese as "Cuarto de Libra con Queso", which translates from Spanish as "Quarter Pound with Cheese".
- Like in most countries, aviation (altitude and flight level) is measured in feet.
