= Estonian units of measurement =

Overview of units of measurement once used in Estonia

A number of units of measurement were used in Estonia to measure length, mass, area, capacity, etc.

== Units used during the first half of the 20th century ==
Several units were used in Estonia. These units were Russian and local units.

== Length ==
Several units were used in Estonia to measure length. One archine (Russian) was equal to 0.7112 m.

1 elle (Kuunar) = 0.75 archine

1 Foute = 3/7 archine

1 faden = 3 archine.

== Mass ==
A number of units were used in Estonia to measure mass. One pfund was equal to 430 g (0.430 kg). Some other units are provided below:

1 quent = 1/128 pfund

1 loth = 1/32 pfund

1 liespfund = 20 pfund

1 centner = 120 pfund

1 tonne = 240 pfund

1 schiffspfund = 400 pfund.

== Area ==
Several units were used in Estonia to measure area.

=== Reval (now Tallinn) ===
Some of Reval units are given below:

1 lofstelle = 1855 m^{2}

1 tonnland = 5462.7 m^{2}.

=== Livonian ===
Some of the Livonian units are given below:

1 lofstelle = 3710 m^{2} (accuracy is up to 3 digits)

1 tonnaland = 5194 m^{2}.

=== Capacity ===
A number of units were used to measure capacity. 1 hulmit was equal to 11.48 L.

==== Reval ====
One lof (Reval) was equal to 3 hulmit.

==== Livonian ====
One lof (Livonian) was equal to 6 hulmit. One tonne (Livonian) was equal to 12 hulmit.
