= Malagasy units of measurement =

Units of measurement used in Madagascar

A number of units of measurement were used in Madagascar to measure length, mass, capacity, etc. The Metric system was introduced in Madagascar in 1897.

== System before metric system ==
Several units were used.

=== Length ===
One rahf was equal to 1.18 m (46.46 in) (the value was double in the northern part of Madagascar).

=== Mass ===
==== For gold and silver ====
Units included:

1 vari = 3 nanki = 2 g

1 sompi = 2 vari = 4 g (~60 grain).

=== Capacity ===
One bambou was equal to 2 L (0.0568 bushel).
