= Metrication in Jamaica =

Jamaica started metrication in the 1970s. However, it was not completed until the 2000s.

During an early 1970s Caribbean Free Trade Association (CARIFTA) meeting, all members agreed to move to the metric system in a move to pave the way for a regional market economy.

Since the 1970s, metric units were introduced into the curriculum of the primary and secondary school systems. The Common Entrance and CXC examinations syllabus use metric units. The Ministry of Education also supports a policy of procuring metric-only textbooks for use in the school system. The informal sector involving vocational, adult literacy and retraining facilities were also being transformed.

The adoption of the metric system was officially announced during the Throne Speech of April 1973. The following year, it became legal to use the metric system for commercial purposes. An advisor from New Zealand (where the metric system had just been applied) was the principal advisor to devise the switch.

Large producers of staple foods such as flour, rice, salt, sugar, chicken and other meats, supply products in metric units. A main objective of the Bureau of Standards, a targeted area of work of its Metrication Department, is to have outlets supplying everyday breakbulk items trade in metric units. While not yet a majority, large and medium-sized wholesale and retail outlets, such as supermarkets and fabric stores, have converted islandwide, particularly in the capital Kingston and adjoining urban centres.

On 10 June 2015, the Jamaican government passed the Road Traffic Bill 2014, which formally repealed and replaced the Road Traffic Act and Regulations 1938. The act included updates to Jamaica's traffic laws along with the use of the metric system within regulatory descriptions.

On 18 September 2015, the Jamaican government amended the Weights and Measure Act to include considerable fines to business owners who do not use the metric system.

In 2018, the government recognized that people had still not all switched to the metric system, arguing that local stores prefer to align their measures to their customers' expectations. It was also mentioned that Jamaica's largest trade partner, the USA, might have an influence in Jamaicans' habits with pounds and gallons. The use of the metric system has helped the Ministry of Justice to create effective statistical methods to track the court system nationwide.

== See also ==
- Metrication
