= Latvian units of measurement =

Units of measurement used in Latvia

A number of units of measurements were used in Latvia to measure length, mass, area, and so on. Russian and local measures were used since 1845, and the former system before those, was that of the Netherlands. Latvia officially adopted the international metric system on 1 January 1924. Beer and beverage makers were allowed to use bottles measured in the previous Russian system (e.g. 1 stops or shtof of beer corresponded to 1.28 liters), if the volume in the metric system was also displayed, for an extra one year.

== System before metric system ==
A number of units were used in Russian and local systems.

=== Length ===
Units included:

1 elle = 0.537 m

1 quartier = 1/4 elle

1 meile = 7 verste (Russian) = 7.468 km.

=== Mass ===
One pfund was equal to 0.419 kg.

=== Area ===
One kapp was equal to 148.64 ^{2}. Some other units included:

1 pourvete = 25 kapp

1 loofstelle = 25 kapp

1 tonnstelle = 35 kapp.

=== Volume ===
One faden was equal to 4.077 m^{3}.

=== Capacity ===
One stoof was equal to 1.2752 L. Some other units included:

1 kanne = 2 stoof

1 kulmet = 9 stoof

1 anker = 30 stoof

1 poure = 54 stoof

1 loof = 54 stoof

1 tonne = 108 stoof.
