= Hungarian units of measurement =

A number of units of measurement were used in Hungary to measure length, area, volume, and so on. The metric system was adopted in Hungary in 1874 and has been compulsory since 1876.

== Unit before the metric system ==
The system before the metric system was the old Vienna system.

=== Length ===
Several units were used to measure length. Some units are given below:

- mérföld – Mile, 24000 láb, 7.585944 km (4.713687 mi)
- rúd – Rod, 2 öl, 6.32162 m (20.7402 ft)
- öl – Fathom, 10 láb, 3.160810 m (10.37011 ft)
- kettőslépés – Double step, 6 láb, 1.896486 m (6.22207 ft)
- lépés – Step, 3 láb, 94.8243 cm (3.11103 ft)
- rőf – Ell, 2 láb, 63.2162 cm (2.07402 ft)
- láb – Foot, 31.6081 cm (1.03701 ft)
- arasz – Span, 10 ujj, 19.7551 cm (7.7776 in)
- tenyér – Palm, 4 ujj, 7.9020 cm (3.1110 in)
- hüvelyk – Thumb, 1 1/3 ujj, 2.6340 cm (1.0370 in)
- ujj – Finger, 1/16 láb, 1.9755 cm (0.7778 in)

One arsin was equal to 23.01084 in and one stab was equal to 5.18565 ft.

=== Mass ===
One oka was equal from 2.78 to 3.082 lb.

=== Area ===
Several units were used to measure area. Some units are given below:

1 hold = 4316 m^{2} = 1.0665 acre

1 meile^{2} = 6978 ha

=== Volume ===
A number of units were used to measure volume. Some units are given below:

1 akó (eimer) = 54.30 L

1 halbe = 1/64 akó

1 icce = 1/64 akó

1 metzen = 62.53 L

1 akó = 62.53 L

One fass was equal to 52.545 gallons. The value of eimer was varied from 15.03 (in Upper Hungary) to 19.37 (in Lower Hungary).
