= Costa Rican units of measurement =

Units of measurement used in Costa Rica

A number of units of measurement were used in Costa Rica to measure measurements in length, mass, area, capacity, etc. In Costa Rica, metric system has been adopted since 1910, and has been compulsory since 1912, by a joint convention among Costa Rica, Guatemala, Honduras, Nicaragua and Salvador.

== Pre-metric units ==
Before the metric system, a number of modified Spanish (i.e., Spanish Castilian), English and local units were used.

=== Length ===
A number of units were used to measure length. One vara was equal to 0.8393 m. Some other units are given below:

1 cuarta = 1/4 vara

1 tercia = 1/3 vara

1 mecate = 24 varas.

=== Mass ===
Several units were used to measure mass in Costa Rica, Guatemala, Honduras, Nicaragua, and El Salvador. Some units are given below:

1 caja = 16 kg

1 carga = 161 kg.

As a typical coffee measure, fanega was equal to 46 kg of coffee.

=== Area ===
Several units were used to measure area in Costa Rica, Guatemala, Honduras, Nicaragua, and El Salvador. One manzana was equal to 10,000 square varas or 6960.5 m^{2}. One caballeria was equal to 64 manzanas.

=== Capacity ===
Several units were used to measure capacity in Costa Rica, Guatemala, Honduras, Nicaragua, and El Salvador. One botella was equal to 0.63 to 0.67 L. One cajuela was equal to 16.6 L. The capacity of one cuartillo is very variable.
