= Haitian units of measurement =

Units of measurement used in Haiti

A number of units of measurement were used in Haiti to measure length, area, volume, etc. Since 1921, Metric system has been compulsory in Haiti.

== Units before the metric system ==
Older units before the Metric system were British, old French, and Spanish.

=== Length ===
Several units were used in Haiti. One toise was 1.9488 m and one anne was 1.188 m, according to the legal equivalents during the transition period to metric system.

=== Area ===
One carreau was equal to 1292.3 square meters according to the legal equivalents during the transition period to metric system.

=== Volume ===
Several units were used to measure volume. Some units and their equivalents according to the transition period, are given below:

1 baril = 0.1 m^{3}

1 corde = 3.84 m^{3}

1 toise = 8 m^{3}.
