= Icelandic units of measurement =

Units of measurement used in Iceland

A number of units of measurement were used in Iceland to measure length, mass, area, capacity, etc. Since 1907, the metric system has been compulsory in Iceland.

== Unit system before the metric system ==
A number of units were used and these units were analogues to Danish.

=== Length ===
A number of units were used in Iceland to measure length. One foot (fet) was equal to 0.31385 m and one nautical mile (sjómíla) was equal to 1,855 m, as they were defined by their metric equivalents. Some other units are given below:

- 1 line (lína) = 1/144 feet
- 1 inch (þumlungur) = 1/12 feet
- 1 ell (alin) = 2 feet
- 1 fathom (faðmur) = 6 feet
- 1 mile (míla á landi or landmíla) = 24,000 feet
- Þingmannaleið = 20,000 faðmar = 120,000 feet

=== Mass ===
A number of units were used to measure mass. One pound (pund) was equal to 0.5 kg as it was defined by its metric equivalent. Some other units are given below:

- 1 mark (mörk) = 1/2 pound
- 1 fisk = 8 pounds
- 1 fierding = 40 pounds
- 1 liespund = 64 pounds
- 1 barrel of butter (tunna smjörs) = 224 pounds
- 1 skippund = 320 pounds
- 1 batt = 320 pounds

=== Area ===
A number of units were used to measure area. One square fathom was equal to 3.546 m^{2} and one square mile was equal to 56.7383 km^{2}, as they were defined by their metric equivalents. Some other units are given below:

- 1 square inches = 1/5,184 square fathom
- 1 square feet = 1/36 square fathom
- 1 square alin = 1/9 square fathom
- 1 túndagslátta = 900 square fathom
- 1 engjateigur = 1,600 square fathom

=== Volume ===
A number of units were used to measure capacity. One pot (pottur) was equal to 0.9661 L as it was defined by its metric equivalent. Some other units are given below:

- 1 kornskeppa = 18 pots
- 1 anker = 39 pots
- 1 general barrel (almenn tunna) = 120 pots
- 1 barrel of ale (öltunna) = 136 pots
- 1 korntunna = 144 pots
