= Metrication in Sweden =

Sweden decided to adopt the metric system in 1876. After a ten-year transition period starting 1879, the use of legacy units was outlawed by the beginning of 1889.

== History ==
On 28 January 1875 André Oscar Wallenberg suggested to the Swedish parliament that the metric system should be implemented in Sweden. After the suggestion was approved in the Swedish Parliament 22 May 1875, work started to draft a law for metrication.

After about one year of drafts, debates and amendments, the law was approved 14 May 1876. The first part of the law stated that the meter was the basis for measurement of length and the kilogram the basis for measurement of weight. It also stated the prefixes and decimal relation to be used. During the debates, the length of the transition period, first planned until 1883, and the fact that Sweden already had changed to a decimal based measurement system in 1855 were discussed. The law also defined the ny mil as exactly 10000 meter, from the former 10688 meter Swedish mile.

The law stated that the introduction should take place progressively from 1879 to 1888, and that the metric system should be used exclusively from the beginning of 1889.

== Late adoptions ==
- Lumber is sold in metric units, with its width and thickness given in millimetres. Sawn timber is normally available by width and thickness in multiples of 25 millimetres, for example 50 × 100 mm. This is inherited from the former practice of using the 25 mm inch. Planed timber is normally sold in multiples of 25 mm minus 5 mm for planing, for example 45 × 95 mm. Giving the measurements in inches was still common in the late 20th century, about 100 years after the metric system was implemented, but have since become less common.

== Current exceptions ==
- In everyday language, display sizes for television sets and computer monitor screens are often referred to in their diagonal measured in inches. In formal specifications, centimetres are always given.
- The lengths of pipes and watering hoses' are measured and sold in metres, but their diameters are measured in both inches (defined as 25 mm) and in millimetres.
- Textile is normally sold in metres but the thread count is in threads per square inch.
- The price of gold, is quoted in US dollars per ounce.
- McDonald's sells its Quarter Pounder with cheese as Quarter Pounder Cheese or QP Cheese
- The number of teeth on a saw is measured in teeth per inch (TPI)
- Hammers are measured in millimetres but weighed in ounces.
- Sailing yachts are measured in feet.
- Distances larger than 10 to 20 kilometres are usually given in mil, a metric successor of the slightly longer Swedish mile, redefined in 1876 as 10 kilometres. However, road signs use metres and kilometres.
- Traditionally, fuel consumption of cars was usually given in litres per mil. Since joining the European Union, the measure litres per 100 kilometre is legally required and more common in official material and advertising. In everyday use, litres per mil is still common. In some contexts, such as calculating cost of ownership of a vehicle ("milkostnad", i.e. cost per mil) and reimbursement for using a privately owned vehicle instead of a company car ("milersättning"), the mil is even still used in legal texts, in spite of officially not being a legal unit of length.
- World oil price is quoted in US dollars per Barrels.
- The metric yardstick is commonly called tumstock (tum is the Swedish word for inch), instead of meterstock or måttstock. It was during the 20th century usually graded in (English) inches and centimetres, but increasingly only in centimetres.
- The power of fuel powered engines is given in horsepower, though the power of electrical engines is given in watts.
- Like in most countries, aviation (altitude and flight level) is measured in feet.

== See also ==
- Swedish units of measurement
