= Oka (mass) =

Ottoman unit of mass

The oka, okka, or oke (Ottoman Turkish: اوقه) was an Ottoman measure of mass, equal to 400 dirhems (Ottoman drams). Its value varied, but it was standardized in the late empire as 1.2829 kilograms. 'Oka' is the most usual spelling today; 'oke' was the usual contemporary English spelling; 'okka' is the modern Turkish spelling, and is usually used in academic work about the Ottoman Empire.

In Albania, oka varied in weight between 1.25 kg (small oka) and 1.408 kg (large oka) depending on the region. It was formally replaced by the metric system in 1922 but continued to be used until a comprehensive implementation of the metric system in 1946.

In Turkey, the traditional unit is now called the eski okka 'old oka' or kara okka 'black okka'; the yeni okka 'new okka' is the kilogram.

In Greece, the oka (οκά, plural οκάδες) was standardized at 1.282 kg and remained in use until traditional units were abolished on March 31, 1953—the metric system had been adopted in 1876, but the older units remained in use.

In Cyprus, the oka was equal to 1.270058636 kg or 4 onjas, each weighing 100 drams, and it remained in use until 1986, when Cyprus adopted the metric system.

In Egypt, the monetary oka weighted 1.23536 kg. In Tripolitania, it weighed 1.2208 kg, equal to 2½ artals.

The oka was also used as a unit of volume. In Wallachia, it was 1.283 liters of liquid and 1.537 L of grain (dry measure). In Greece, an oka of oil was 1.280 kg, which would have translated to about 1.340 litres (at 0.916 kg/l).
