= Fanega =

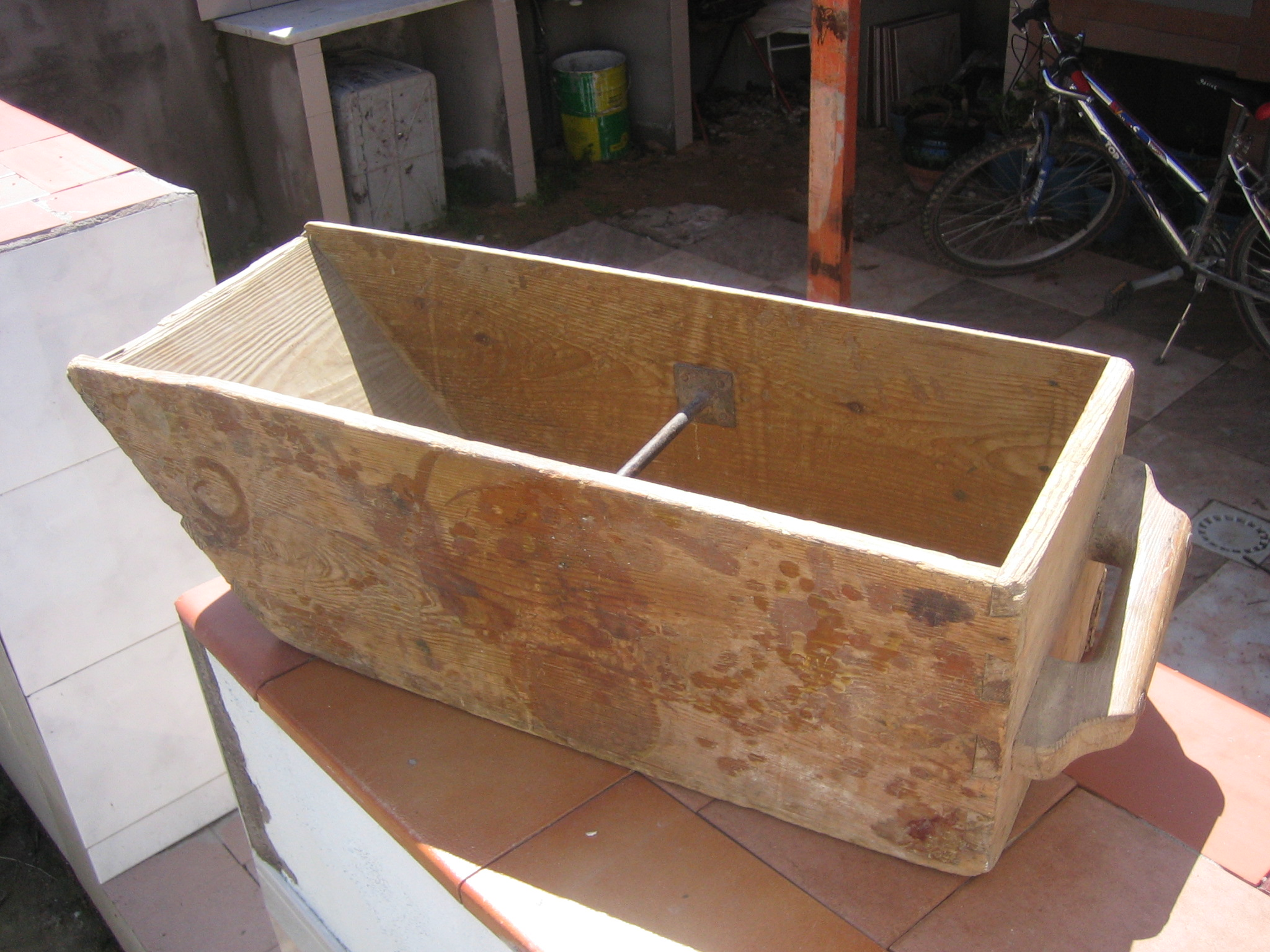
- Fanega

General information
- Unit system: Spanish customary units (colonial era)
- Unit of: Volume (dry capacity) – also used as a land measure in context
- Symbol: Fanega

Conversions
1 Fanega in ...	... is equal to ...
- cajuelas: 20
- Liters: ~400

Fanega was a historical unit of volume used in Spain and colonial-era Costa Rica for measuring dry commodities, especially agricultural produce. Originating as a Spanish measure for grain, the fanega became the standard gauge for bulk goods in colonial administration and trade. In Costa Rica, it was most commonly applied to staple crops like maize and later to coffee. The term also appeared in legal decrees and records, specifying tribute payments or crop tithes. Pérez Zeledón, a key coffee-producing canton, exemplifies the fanega’s enduring role: coffee yields and export volumes there have long been quantified in fanegas, linking local agricultural practice to a colonial measurement tradition. The fanega’s usage persisted into the 19th and 20th centuries, notably in the coffee economy, even as the country transitioned to metric units.

== Etymology and origins ==
The word fanega comes from the Spanish unit of measure of the same name, derived from the Andalusi Arabic faníqa (“measure for grains”), itself from classical Arabic fanīqah meaning “a sack for carrying earth”. In Spain, the fanega was defined as about 55.5 L. By the 19th century in Costa Rica, one fanega equaled twenty cajuelas, a local wooden box measure for coffee cherries (≈ 400 L).

== Colonial administration and usage ==
During Spanish colonial rule, the fanega was a crucial unit in administrative records, taxation, and legal decrees. A 1611 tribute arrangement for the indigenous community of Ujarrás required 3 fanegas de maíz to be delivered, valued at 18 reales. In a 1605 report, the provision to parish priests included sixty fanegas of maize, along with wine and cattle.

== The fanega in the coffee economy ==
=== Adoption for coffee measurement ===
As coffee became Costa Rica’s dominant export crop in the 19th century, the fanega became synonymous with coffee volume, defined as 20 cajuelas. This volumetric measure was codified by the coffee authorities and favored ripe cherry selection, improving coffee quality.

=== Coffee production in Pérez Zeledón ===
Pérez Zeledón, settled by farmers from the Central Valley in the late 1800s, measured coffee output in fanegas. A 1930s estate of 150 manzanas yielded 1,800 fanegas annually, plus purchases from smaller growers. In 2022–23, Pérez Zeledón produced 215,000 fanegas, second only to Tarrazú.

== Regional variations and synonyms ==
In Costa Rica, one fanega equals 20 cajuelas (≈ 400 L), whereas in Nicaragua it was about 187.5 L and in some regions over 1,100 L.

== Legacy and cultural significance ==
Despite full legal metrication in 1887, Costa Rica’s coffee sector retains the fanega internally, linking modern practice to colonial-era measurement traditions.

== See also ==
- Bushel
