= Spanish units of measurement =

Spanish and Portuguese units of measurement

Castilian system of distance units
| Spanish | English | Length in pies | Length in SI |
|---|---|---|---|
| punto | "point" | 1/1728 | 0.1613 mm |
| línea | "line" | 1/144 | 1.935 mm |
| pulgada | "inch" | 1/12 | 2.3216 cm |
| pie | "foot" | 1 | 27.86 cm |
| vara | "yard" | 3 | 83.59 cm |
| paso | "pace" | 5 | 1.3932 m |
| cordel | "chain" | 150 | 41.795 m |
| milla | "mile" | 5,000 | 1.3932 km |
| legua legal antigua | "old league" | 15,000 | 4.1795 km |
| legua | "league" | 20,000 | 5.5727 km |

There are a number of Spanish units of measurement of length or area that are now virtually obsolete due to metrication. They include the vara, the cordel, the league and the labor. The units of area used to express the area of land are still encountered in some transactions in land today.

== Vara (unit of length) ==
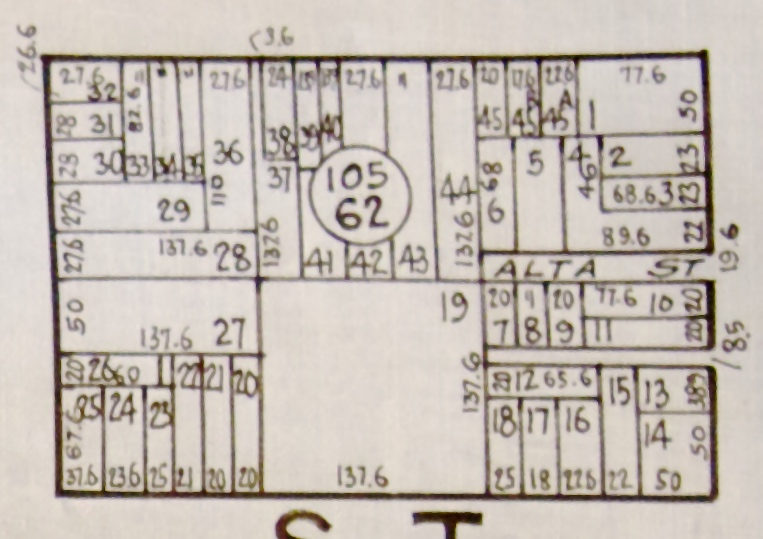
This street block is made up of six (2 × 3) 50-vara plots. The California vara is 33 inches (840 mm), so 50 vara results in 137.6-foot (41.9 m) plots. Subplots are within the original boundary lines. The San Francisco business district bounded by Union, Kearny, Filber, and Montgomery Streets was originally called the 50 Vara District.

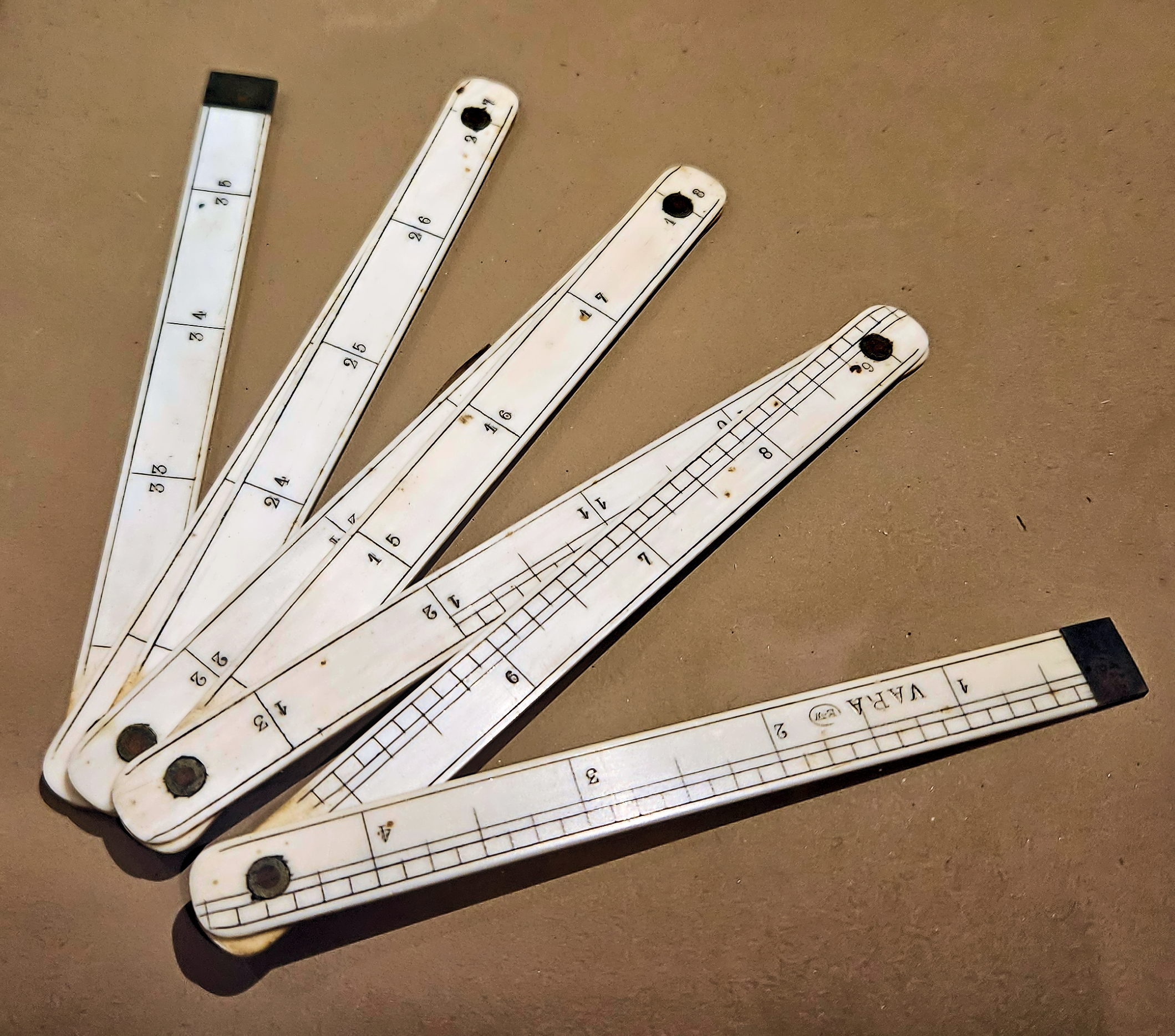
Ivory vara (yardstick) used by Franciscan missionaries during the California Mission period.

A vara (meaning "rod" or "pole", abbreviation: var) is an old Spanish unit of length. Varas are a surveying unit that appear in many deeds in the southern United States due to the land previously being part of Mexico, and becoming part of the United States under the Treaty of Guadalupe Hidalgo. Varas were also used in many parts of Latin America. It varied in size at various times and places; the Spanish unit was set at about 835.905 mm (32.91 in) in 1801. In Argentina, the vara measured about 866 mm (34.1 in), and typical urban lots are 8.66 m (28.41 ft) wide (10 Argentine varas). At some time a value of 33 inches (838.2 mm) was adopted in California.

Standardisation of measurement in Texas came with the introduction of varas, cordeles, and leagues. In Texas, a vara was defined as 33 1/3 inches (846.67 mm), or 1 yard = 1.08 vara. The vara and the corresponding unit of area, the square vara, were introduced in the 19th century to measure Spanish land grants. Stephen F. Austin's early surveying contracts required that he use the vara as a standard unit. The vara can be seen in many deeds as late as the mid to late 1900s. 1 acre (0.405 ha) is equivalent to 5,645.376 Texan square varas. A league is equivalent to 5,000 varas squared or 4,428.4 acres (1,792.11 ha).

A measure of 100 by 100 varas (Spanish) is almost 7000 square meters, and is known traditionally throughout Spain and Latin America as a manzana (i.e., a "city block"). As well, lumber is still measured in Costa Rica using a system based on 4 vara, or 11 feet, for both round and square wood. With square wood, using inches, the width is multiplied by the depth to get a measurement called pulgadas, or inches. The lumber is charged 'per inch', which is a measurement of 2.2 litres (11/12 board foot).

=== Palmo and coto (unit of length) ===
The palmo ("palm") measured the distance between the tip of the thumb and the tip of the little finger with all fingers splayed. Its standardized value is 20.873 cm (8.2177 in) (9 pulgadas). Half of a palmo in Castile was called the coto, described as six fingers and defined as 10.4365 cm (4.10886 in). The ancient Romans had a similar, smaller unit called the palmus, which was 7.3925 cm (2.91043 in).

=== Other Units of length ===
- Estado, a unit of length used for measuring depths (similar to the fathom); 7 pies
- Pulgada (inch: 23 mm) used in Spain.
- Jeme, measure of length, from the tip of the thumb to the tip of the index finger of an extended hand.
- Legua (league), a unit of length.
- Toesas, unit of length equal to 66.72 inches (1.695 m)

== Labor (unit of area) ==
The labor (/ləˈbɔːr/ in West Texas) is a unit of area, used to express an area of land, that is equal to 1 million square varas. A labor is equivalent to about 177.1 acres (71.67 ha). It was used in the archaic system of old Spanish land grants affecting Texas and parts of adjoining states. The labor is often used as an approximate equivalent to a quarter-section (that is, one quarter of a square mile of land). It is still encountered in modern real estate transactions.

=== Other Units of area ===
- Manzana, a unit of land measure in Honduras.
- Caballería, a unit of land measure in Cuba.
- Quiñón, a unit of land measure in the Philippines.
- Tahúlla, a unit of land measure in Valencia.

== League (unit of area) ==
A league can also be a unit of area, used to express the area of land, that is equal to 25 million square varas. A (square) league is equivalent to about 4,428.4 acres (1,792.11 ha). It was used in the archaic system of old Spanish land grants affecting Texas and parts of adjoining states and this use of league is used throughout the Texas Constitution.

A common Texas land grant size, discussed in James A. Michener's Texas, was a "labor and a league": a labor of good riparian land and a (square) league of land away from the river.

The (square) league is still encountered in modern real estate transactions.

== Local units ==
Although some standardisation was achieved with the law of 1801, particularly in defining the league as 6666 2/3 varas long, varying measures continued to be used in various cities and regions.

| Town | Vara (m) | Libra (kg) | (Media) Cántara or Arroba (wine) (l) | Arroba (oil) (l) | Media Fanega (l) | Legua (km) |
|---|---|---|---|---|---|---|
| Alava | 0.836 | 0.4601 | 16.133 | 12.563 | 55.501 (Fanega) | 5.5727 |
| Albacete | 0.837 | 0.458 | 6.365 | | 28.325 | |
| Alicante | 0.912 | 0.533 | 0.60 | 11.55 | 20.775 | 5.555 |
| Almería | 0.833 | 0.460 | 8.18 | —N/a | 27.531 | 5.573 |
| Ávila | 0.836 | 0.460 | 7.96 | —N/a | 28.20 | |
| Badajoz | 0.836 | 0.460 | 8.21 | 6.21 | 27.92 | 5.573 |
| Balearic Islands | 0.782 | 0.407 | | | 35.17 | |
| Barcelona | 1.555 | 0.400 | 30.35 | 4.15 | 34.759 | |
| Burgos | 0.836 | 0.4001 | 7.05 | —N/a | 27.17 | 5.573 |
| Cáceres | 0.836 | 0.456 | 1.73 | 1.60 | 26.88 | |
| Cádiz | 0.836 | 0.460 | 7.922 | 6.26 | | 5.573 |
| Canary Islands | 0.842 | 0.460 | 5.08 (Santa Cruz); 5.34 (Las Palmas) | | 31.33 (Santa Cruz) | |
| Castellón | 0.906 | 0.358 | 11.27 | 12.14 | 16.60 | 5.573 |
| Ciudad Real | 0.839 | 0.460 | 8.00 | 6.22 | 27.29 | 6.687 |
| Córdoba | 0.836 | 0.460 | 16.31 | —N/a | 27.60 | 5.573 |
| A Coruña | 0.843 | 0.575 | 15.58 (wine); 16.43 (Aguardiente) | 12.43 | 16.15 (flour) | 5.573 |
| Cuenca | 0.836 | 0.460 | 7.88 | —N/a | 27.10 | |
| Girona | 1.559 | 0.400 | 15.48 | —N/a | 18.08 | 3.762 |
| Granada | 0.836 | 0.460 | 8.21 | —N/a | 27.35 | 5.573 |
| Guadalajara | 0.836 | 0.460 | 8.21 | —N/a | 27.40 | |
| Guipuzcoa | 0.837 | 0.492 | | | 27.65 | |
| Huelva | 0.836 | 0.460 | 7.89 | —N/a | 27.531 | 5.573 |
| Huesca | 0.772 | 0.351 | 9.98 | 0.37 | 22.46 | 4.1173 |
| Jaén | 0.839 | 0.460 | 8.02 | 7.12 | 27.37 | |
| León | 0.836 | 0.460 | 7.92 | —N/a | 18.11 | |
| Lleida | 0.778 | 0.401 | 11.38 | —N/a | 18.34 | |
| Logroño | 0.837 | 0.460 | 16.04 | —N/a | 27.47 | 5.573 |
| Lugo | 0.855 | 0.573 | 0.47 | | 13.13 | |
| Madrid | 0.843 | 0.460 | 8.15 | —N/a | 27.67 | 5.573 |
| Málaga | 0.836 | 0.460 | 8.33 | —N/a | 26.97 | 5.573 |
| Murcia | 0.836 | 0.460 | 7.80 | —N/a | 27.64 | 5.573 |
| Navarra | 0.785 | 0.372 | 11.77 | 0.41 | 28.13 | 5.495 |
| Ourense | 0.836 | 0.574 | 15.96 | 13.88 | 18.79 | |
| Palencia | 0.836 | 0.460 | 7.88 | 6.12 | 27.7505 | |
| Pontevedra | 0.836 | 0.579 | 16.35 | 15.58 | 20.86 | |
| Salamanca | 0.836 | 0.460 | 7.99 | | 27.29 | 5.573 |
| Segovia | 0.837 | 0.460 | 8 | —N/a | 27.30 | |
| Sevilla | 0.836 | 0.460 | 15.66 | —N/a | 27.35 | 5.573 |
| Soria | 0.836 | 0.460 | 7.90 | —N/a | 27.57 | |
| Teruel | 0.768 | 0.367 | 10.96 | —N/a | 21.40 | 5.573 |
| Toledo | 0.837 | 0.460 | 8.12 | 6.25 | 27.75 | 5.573 |
| Valencia | 0.906 | 0.355 | 10.77 | 11.93 | 16.75 | |
| Valladolid | 0.836 | 0.460 | 7.82 | —N/a | 27.39 | 5.573 |
| Vizcaya | 0.836 | 0.488 | | 6.74 | 28.46 | 5.573 |
| Zaragoza | 0.772 | 0.350 | 9.91 | 13.93 (aceite); 13.33 (aguardiente) | 22.42 | 5.573 |

== Other units ==
- Units of weight
  - Onza (ounce), a unit of weight (28 grammes) used for chocolate.
  - Adarme, subdivision of the ounce.
  - tomín, subidivision of the adarme.
  - Dracma subdivision of the ounce, used for pharmaceuticals.
  - Libra (pound), a unit of weight equivalent to 16 onzas.
  - Quintal, a unit of weight equivalent to 100 Libras.
  - Arroba, the fourth part of a quintal
- Units of volume
  - Almud, a unit of volume.
  - Celemín, a unit of volume equivalent to approximately 4.625 L.
  - Fanega, measure of grain by volume
  - Ferrado (of which there are 12 cuncas) used in Galicia in northwestern peninsular Spain.

== See also ==
- International System of Units
- Metrication in Guatemala
- Portuguese customary units
- Systems of measurement
- Units of measurement
