= Arroba =

Unit of mass

Arroba is a Portuguese, Catalan and Aragonese customary unit of weight, mass or volume. Its symbol is @.

== History ==
The word arroba has its origin in Arabic ar-rubʿ (الربع) or "quarter," specifically the fourth part (of a quintal), which defined the average clementecatalan w a donkey could carry.

== Iberian Peninsula ==
In weight it was equal to 32 pounds (14.7 kg) in Portugal and 25 pounds (11.5 kg) in Galicia, Asturias, Basque Country, Aragon, Catalonia, Valencia, Castille, León and Andalusia.

The unit is still used by cork merchants and pig farmers.

== Latin America ==
The unit is still used in Brazil by the agricultural sector, mainly in the cotton and cattle business. The modern metric arroba used in these countries in everyday life is defined as 15 kilograms (33 lb).

In Colombia, Ecuador, and Peru the arroba is equivalent to 12.5 kilograms (28 lb).

In Bolivia nationally it is equivalent to 30.46 litres (6.70 imp gal; 8.05 US gal). However locally there are many different values, ranging from 11.5 litres (2.5 imp gal; 3.0 US gal) in Inquisivi to 16 litres (3.5 imp gal; 4.2 US gal) in Baures.

== Internet ==
In Ibero-Romance and Occitano-Romance languages, "arroba" has continued as the word for the "@" symbol used in Internet email addresses and other messaging and collaboration software.

== See also ==
- Portuguese customary units
- Spanish customary units
