= Headlight flashing =

Act of flashing a motor vehicle's headlights

Typical dashboard icon indicating that high beams are illuminated

Headlight flashing is the act of either briefly switching on the headlights of a car, or of momentarily switching between a headlight's high beams and low beams, in an effort to communicate with another driver or drivers. The signal is sometimes referred to in car manufacturers' manuals as an optical horn, since it draws the attention of other drivers.

The signal is intended to convey a warning to other drivers of road hazards.

== History ==
Headlight flashing might have come into more common use as a means of attempting driver-to-driver communication by the mid-1970s, when cars began to come with headlight beam selectors located on the steering column—typically activated by pulling the turn signal stalk—rather than the previous foot-operated pushbutton switches. The signal stalk configuration was later wired to permit the momentary activation of the high beams regardless of whether the headlamp switch was turned on or off. Motorcycle headlamp modulators automatically oscillate the intensity of the headlamp in an effort to make the motorcycle more conspicuous to other drivers.

== Uses ==
Headlight flashing attracts attention, and so can be considered the visual equivalent of blowing the horn. Indeed, some car owner's manuals identify headlight control on the steering column as the "optical horn". Like the horn, it has many uses:

- Letting other drivers know of one's presence.
- Acknowledging the presence or actions of other drivers.
- Signaling that the flashing driver is yielding the right of way, for example at an intersection controlled by stop signs.
- Warning other drivers of road dangers, such as crashed cars or police speed traps.
- Giving thanks to other drivers. For example, when one is warned of police presence, it is sometimes considered courteous to flash back.
- Informing other drivers of problems with their car, such as headlamps left off after dark, burned out or misaligned lights, or misuse of high beam rather than low beam in traffic; or to berate a driver who poses a risk to traffic. Headlight flashing coupled with blowing the car's horn can help clear deer from a driver's path.
- Indicating the intention to overtake another driver, or to signal a driver who has just overtaken that they can now return to the original lane. Flashing can request or insist that a leading driver speed up or change lanes to get out of the way of a faster following driver.

Headlight flashing may sometimes play a part in aggressive driving, and can be used in an attempt to intimidate others into speeding or otherwise driving unsafely. Headlight flashing may also indicate protest or celebration of an event or political position.

Some drivers attempt to communicate "I will continue my current behavior!" when flashing their headlights. For example, if such a driver flashes his or her headlights while slowing down, they intend to communicate to another driver who is waiting to merge in traffic: "Go on, I will let you merge!" On the other hand, if such a driver keeps his or her current speed and flashes headlights, they intend to communicate "Stay back, I am not slowing down!"

== Effectiveness and ambiguity ==
Headlight flashing as an effective mode of driver communication has been questioned, and researchers have found the ability of drivers to communicate with one another is about the same as the communication abilities among insects.

Flashed headlamps can have ambiguous or contradictory meanings, with no way for the observing driver to tell for sure what the flashing driver is trying to say. It may mean, for example, that the flashing driver intends to yield the right of way, or instead that they intend to take it. Misinterpretation of the flashing driver's intent can cause crashes.

== Legality and meaning ==
=== Australia ===
Headlight flashing to warn drivers of traffic enforcement cameras is illegal in the state of Queensland, carrying a $30 fine and one demerit point, or a $1,500 fine if the fine is unsuccessfully challenged in court. Officers may either fine a driver for improper use of headlights, or may even arrest and prosecute for hindering police.

In the state of South Australia, headlight flashing by regular drivers (that is, not a police officer, etc.) for any reason is illegal, except in emergency purposes and immediately before overtaking.

In Victoria, Traffic Superintendent Dean McWhirter has said he is happy for motorists to flash their lights to warn other motorists they were approaching a speed camera in 2013.

=== Bangladesh ===
Headlight flashing is common in Bangladesh, where roads are sometimes narrow and lane discipline is lax. It is done by large vehicles such as buses or trucks to alert smaller, more maneuverable vehicles to their presence and to encourage them to make way, for example by moving to the side of the road.

=== Canada ===
In Ontario, the Highway Traffic Act does not prohibit "flashing head beams". Some have brought tickets to court, claiming the law only regulates the use of alternating lights in an attempt to impersonate emergency and law enforcement vehicles, and not a driver's manually flashing his car's headlamps to communicate with other drivers. The section that deals with alternating headlights in Ontario is Section 169 of the Highway Traffic Act. It is an offence to improperly use high-beams at night, which is dealt with by way of section 168 of the Highway Traffic Act.

=== India ===
In India, headlight flashing has different meanings to different drivers in different places and situations, though frequently means a request to give way. Despite government attempts to curb misuse, the high beam is frequently used as the standard for night time driving by a substantial number of vehicles, given the proportionately poorly lit roads and highways.

Tamil Nadu law explicitly prohibits the use of headlight flashing; the Tamil Nadu Motor Vehicle Rules state that ‘lights are not to be used or manipulated in a manner that causes danger or undue inconvenience to a person by dazzle’, under Section 495.

=== Jamaica ===
On some occasions, motorists who flashed their headlights to warn of police activity have unwittingly helped fugitives evade police. In 2008, one of Jamaica's most wanted men went around police checkpoints which had been set up on his most likely routes after a driver had flashed his headlights to warn of police ahead. Drivers were warned that flashing headlights may result in "unwittingly facilitating criminal activity".

=== Philippines ===
Headlight flashing is understood and practiced differently in the Philippines compared to the usual global context. Drivers in the Philippines use headlight flashing to inform vehicles and pedestrians of their presence, which may mean simply yielding to others or asserting one's right of way. Thus, vehicles and pedestrians may proceed with crossing the road or are obliged to stop and give way to the other vehicle that has flashed its headlights. This has become the norm that in crossroads, that whoever flashed their headlights first, gets to safely cross first. Moreover, it has something to do with performing overtakes. A vehicle that wishes to overtake a slower moving one in front of it, may flash its headlights a few times to signify the intent to overtake.

=== United Kingdom ===
Though not all of its rules represent law, the Highway Code states "Only flash your headlights to let other road users know that you are there. Do not flash your headlights in an attempt to intimidate other road users".

Headlight flashing in the United Kingdom is often used as a signal that the driver flashing you is offering to let you go first. Such use is however strongly discouraged because it can lead to accidents where the driver flashing has not seen the approach of another road user. Using it to indicate that you are coming through and the other driver must wait, could lead to an accident.

Drivers should also be aware of the so-called "Flash-for-Cash" scam, in which criminals flash their lights to let other drivers out of a junction, then crash into them on purpose in order to make fraudulent insurance claims for damage and whiplash injury.

=== United States ===
In the United States, although the legality of headlight flashing varies from state to state, a federal court ruled that flashing headlights was a constitutionally protected form of speech, issuing an injunction prohibiting a police department from citing or prosecuting drivers who flash their lights to warn of radar and speed traps. On 23 April 2019, another court ruled that headlight flashing may be protected by the First Amendment. Two state circuit courts have also ruled that headlight flashing is protected activity.

Some states consider that drivers have a First Amendment right to flash their headlights. In other states, law enforcement officers may give citations for headlight flashing under laws prohibiting a person from obstructing a police investigation, laws prohibiting a person from having flashing lights on their vehicle, or laws prohibiting shining a vehicle's high beams at oncoming traffic. The specific language of each law varies by state along with courts' holdings on whether their respective laws prohibit headlight flashing. Additionally, although not legally binding, the state driver's manual of some states suggests flashing high beams under specific scenarios (e.g., if an oncoming vehicle is using its high beams, driver's manuals suggest a motorist flash his or her high beams momentarily).

==== Alaska ====
In Alaska, a State Trooper has been found to have probable cause to stop a driver who flashes both a vehicle's high beams and his "moose lights" based upon a violation of 13 AAC 04.020(e)(1).

==== Arizona ====
In Arizona, flashing high beams or headlights is a violation of A.R.S. Section 28-942.1 (Failure to Dim Headlights). However, A.R.S. Section 28-942.2. states: If the driver of a vehicle follows another vehicle within 200 feet to the rear, except when engaged in the act of overtaking and passing, the driver shall use a distribution of light permissible under this article other than the uppermost distribution of light specified in section 28-941, paragraph 1.

==== California ====
In California, headlight flashing is legal in some situations and illegal in others. It is legal for a driver to flash his headlights to indicate intention to pass on a road which does not allow passing on the right. However, headlight flashing on multiple-lane highways is illegal.

Article [21753] Except when passing on the right is permitted, the driver of an overtaken vehicle shall safely move to the right-hand side of the highway in favor of the overtaking vehicle after an audible signal or a momentary flash of headlights by the overtaking vehicle, and shall not increase the speed of his or her vehicle until completely passed by the overtaking vehicle. This section does not require the driver of an overtaken vehicle to drive on the shoulder of the highway in order to allow the overtaking vehicle to pass. (Amended by Stats. 1999, Ch. 724, Sec. 40. Effective January 1, 2000.)

==== Florida ====
In Florida, headlight flashing is protected free speech pursuant to the First Amendment. Additionally, on 1 January 2013, §316.2397(7), Fla. Stat. was amended to legalize headlight flashing. In 2005 and 2011, judges in County Court held that flashing a vehicle's headlights is not a violation of §316.239(7), Fla. Stat.

==== Illinois ====
In Illinois, a "flashing to warn" citation was successfully defended on 7 May 2015 in Boone County, via People vs. White, as the bench trial judge found the use of Illinois Vehicle Code 12-212(b) addresses lighting equipment, but not motorist behavior relative to usage of lighting systems.

==== Louisiana ====
In Louisiana, drivers who flash headlights are typically cited for a violation of Louisiana Revised Statute Title 32:327, Section C which states: Flashing lights are prohibited except on authorized emergency vehicles, school buses, or on any vehicle as a means of indicating a right or left turn, or the presence of a vehicular traffic hazard requiring unusual care in approaching, overtaking or passing.

==== Maryland ====
In Maryland, police officers sometimes ticket drivers for flashing car headlights under a law which prohibits driving in a vehicle with flashing lights and laws prohibiting "obstructing a police investigation". The American Civil Liberties Union of Maryland challenges the current interpretation of the law, contending the law refers to an adjective and not a verb; that automatic flashing lights on non-emergency vehicles are illegal, but the act by a driver of manually flashing a vehicle's headlamps is not. Though ticketing was common in the 1990s, Maryland and Washington DC police say that flashing one's headlights was not against the law in either place.

==== Massachusetts ====
The practice of headlight flashing is technically not forbidden in Massachusetts. A suspicious police officer can ask a motorist if they were flashing their lights to warn oncoming motorists of police presence. If the motorist denies this, the officer can ask if the vehicle has defective lights, which is a violation of Massachusetts General Laws Chapter 90, Section 7.

==== Michigan ====
In Michigan, it is illegal to flash high beams within 500 feet of oncoming traffic.

==== Minnesota ====
In Minnesota, drivers are not prohibited from briefly flashing their high beams in a manner that does not blind or impair approaching drivers.

==== Missouri ====
A trial judge in St. Louis held that drivers have a First Amendment right to flash their headlights.

==== New Jersey ====
In New Jersey, drivers are allowed to flash their headlights to warn approaching drivers about a speed trap ahead. In 1999, The Superior Court of New Jersey Appellate Division held that a statute limiting how far high beams may project is not violated when a motorist flashes his or her high beams to warn oncoming motorists of radar. The Court also concluded that a stop by a police officer based upon high beam flashing is also improper.

==== New York ====
In New York, headlight flashing is not illegal. New York Vehicle and Traffic Law Section 375 [3] requires that headlamps "shall be operated so that dazzling light does not interfere with the driver of the approaching vehicle". In 1994, New York Supreme Court, Appellate Division held that flipping or flicking high beams at approaching vehicles is insufficient to cause the "dazzling lights" prohibited under New York Vehicle and Traffic Law Section 375 [3]. In 2009, the New York Supreme Court Appellate Division (Fourth Department) held that the flashing of lights alone is not a violation of New York Vehicle and Traffic Law Section 375 [3], that stopping a vehicle based upon that is illegal, and all evidence gathered as a result of the illegal stop should be suppressed.

==== North Dakota ====
Under section 39-21-21 of the North Dakota Century Code, it is illegal for a vehicle to flash its high-beam lights for any length of time when an oncoming vehicle within 500 feet, or for any purpose at night.

==== Ohio ====
In Ohio, courts have held that the act of flashing one's headlights so as to alert oncoming drivers of a radar trap does not constitute the offense of obstructing a police officer in the performance of his duties, where there was no proof that the warned vehicles were speeding prior to the warning. In another case, where a driver received a citation under an ordinance prohibiting flashing lights on a vehicle, a court held that the ordinance referred to the noun of flashing lights and did not prohibit the verb of flashing the headlights on a vehicle. In a different case, a court held that a momentary flick of the high beams is not a violation of Ohio R.C. 4513.15 (which prohibits drivers from aiming glaring rays into the eyes of oncoming drivers).

==== Oregon ====
The court of Jackson County has ruled that flashing a vehicle's headlights to warn others about the presence of law enforcement is protected free speech under Article I, section 8, of the Constitution of Oregon.

==== Pennsylvania ====
The Supreme Court of Pennsylvania has ruled that flashing one's highbeams during the day to warn of speed traps is legal.

==== Tennessee ====
In Tennessee, flashing headlights to warn oncoming traffic of a police car ahead is protected free speech under the First Amendment to the United States Constitution.

==== Virginia ====
Headlight flashing to warn of police activity is not against the law in Virginia; however radar detectors remain outlawed. Virginia motor vehicle code specifies an "audible or light signal" to indicate overtaken vehicles should yield in certain situations.

==== Washington ====
Section 46.37.230 of the Revised Code of Washington (RCW) states that drivers may not use their high beams within 500 feet (150 m) of oncoming traffic, or within 300 feet (91 m) of traffic in front of them, meaning that flashing high beams could be considered illegal. However, at least in the case of oncoming traffic, other courts interpreting a statute similar to this one have held that momentary headlight flashing which does not adversely affect the vision of the oncoming driver is not prohibited. Under Washington's law, violating RCW 46.37.230 may result in a $124 traffic infraction.

==== Wisconsin ====
In Wisconsin, the law allows a vehicle operator to intermittently flash a vehicle's highbeam headlamps at an oncoming vehicle whose highbeam headlamps are lit.

== Urban legend ==
Beginning in the early 1980s, a widespread rumor regarding flashing headlights was spread mainly through fax, and later on the Internet. The rumor stated that various gangs across the United States carry out an initiation wherein the initiate drives around at night with his headlights off. Whichever driver flashes his headlamps in response to the unlit car becomes the target; to complete the initiation, the prospective gang member must hunt down and shoot, kill, assault, or rape the target. The story was widely spread by many government organizations, including the New Mexico State Police. This rumor has been proven an urban legend.

The story originated in Montana in the early 1980s, where it was rumored that the Hells Angels bike gang was initiating recruits in this way. By 1984, the story had spread to Eugene, Oregon, where it had morphed into a story of Latino and black gangs targeting whites. In August 1993, the story once again appeared, this time spread through fax and email forwarding. Warning of a "blood initiation weekend" on 25 and 26 September, the rumor this time led some police departments to issue warnings after having received the fake ones. In February 1994, a resident of Massillon, Ohio, revived the rumor by issuing flyers which claimed that killings would take place at Westfield Belden Village. After a night of sending faxes to local businesses, the person was arrested for inciting panic.

The rumor once again spread in October 1998 with a new fax, this time claiming to originate with a Drug Abuse Resistance Education (DARE) officer in Texas. The rumor spread further when officials in the San Diego government circulated the fax among city agencies; this version of the fax, though quickly dismissed within city government when it was found that the Sheriff's office had no real connection to it, now appeared to be a legitimate government-issued document. Also in the fall of 1998, the Sheriff's office of Nassau County, Florida, sent a warning about such gang initiation to the county fire department, who subsequently spread the fax to all county agencies. Police dispatcher Ann Johnson had thought the message urgent enough to send, but had not bothered to check its legitimacy.

A resurgengce of the rumor spread via email in 2006, claiming to be a warning from the police about an initiation ritual by the Bloods. Judy Muller, Assistant Professor of Journalism at the University of Southern California, investigated the accuracy of the rumor for NPR, and easily confirmed it was false with her local police force. She subsequently attended a press conference hosted by a single alleged representative of the gang, Bloodhound, who stated "we believe the police put this out there to make us look like criminals." Bloodhound was unaware this was a rumor that had been spreading for years.

There was a resurgence of this rumor in 2020, fueled via social media platforms such as Instagram and Facebook, and claimed to be from Chubb Electronic Security, who was working with D.A.R.E - despite a South African address on the letterhead.

The rumor provided inspiration for the 1998 film Urban Legend, and served as a plot device in Mark Billingham's 2008 novel In the Dark. An incident inspired by this legend is the catalyst for the 2007 film Death Sentence.

== See also ==
- Motorcycle headlamp modulator
- Wig-wag, automatic headlight flashing device
