= Speed limits in Australia =

Speed limits in Australia range from 5 km/h (3.1 mph) shared zones to 130 km/h (81 mph). Speed limit signage is in km/h since metrication on 1 July 1974. All speed limits, with the sole exception of the South Australian school and roadworks zones, which are signposted at 25 km/h, are multiples of 10 km/h – the last digit in all speed signs is zero. Speed limits are set by state and territory legislation, albeit with co-ordination and discussion between governments.

According to Roads Australia, Australia's default speed limit of 50 km/h "is at odds with the place function and safety of" local roads and streets.

== Default limits ==
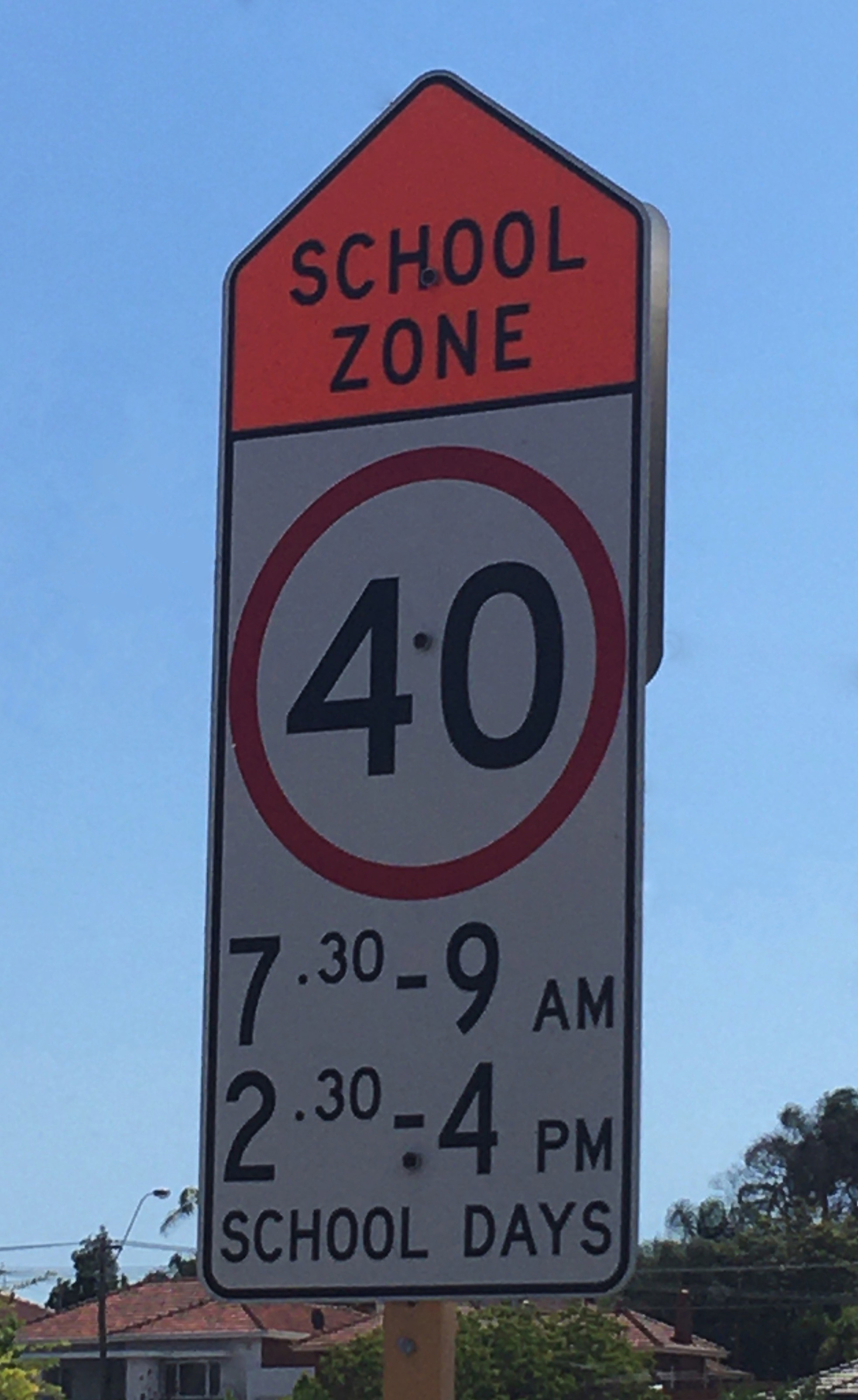
School zone speed limit sign in Western Australia

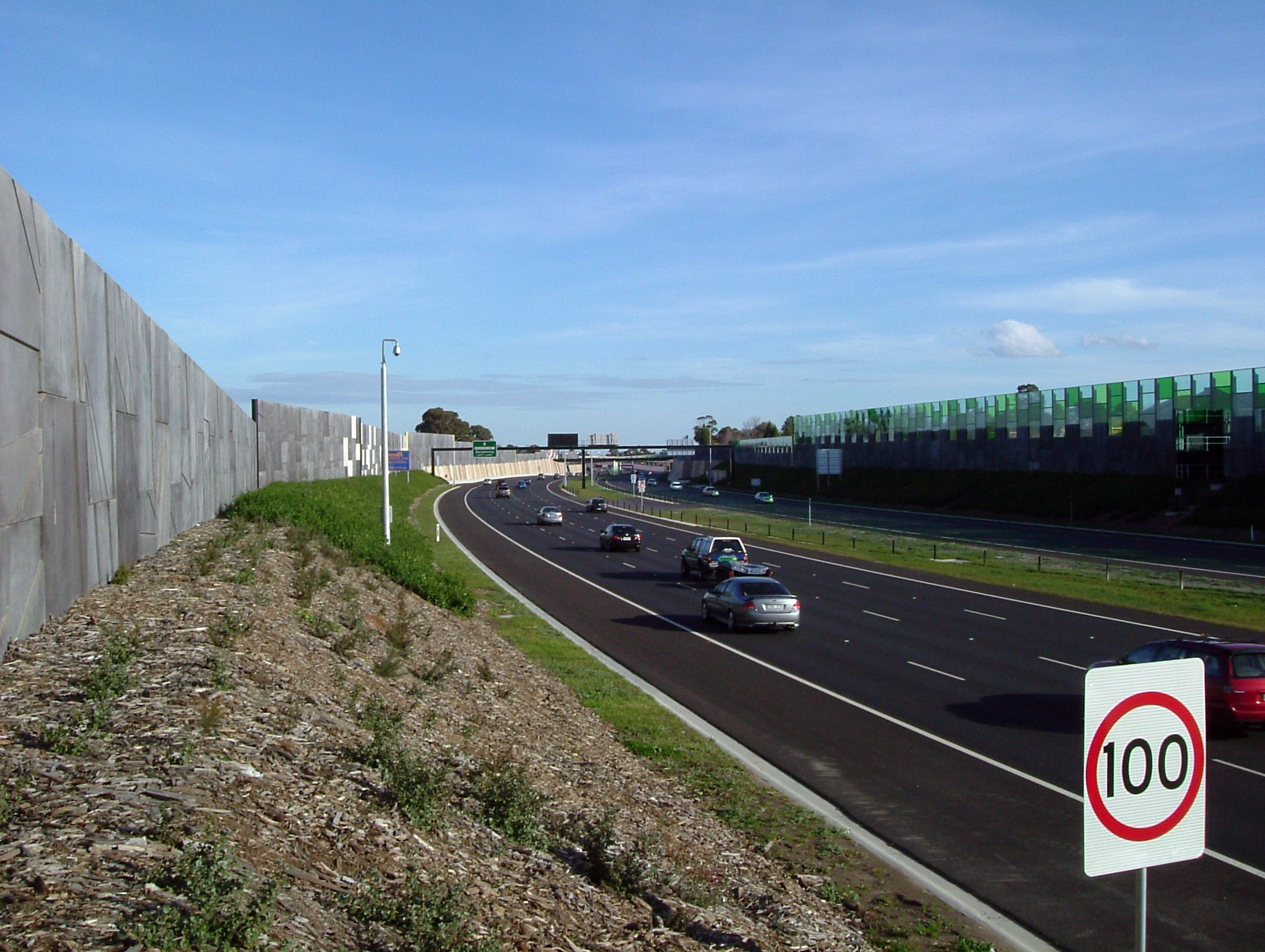
Most urban freeways in Australia have speed limits of 80, 90, 100 or 110 km/h. This example is of the EastLink tolled freeway in Melbourne.

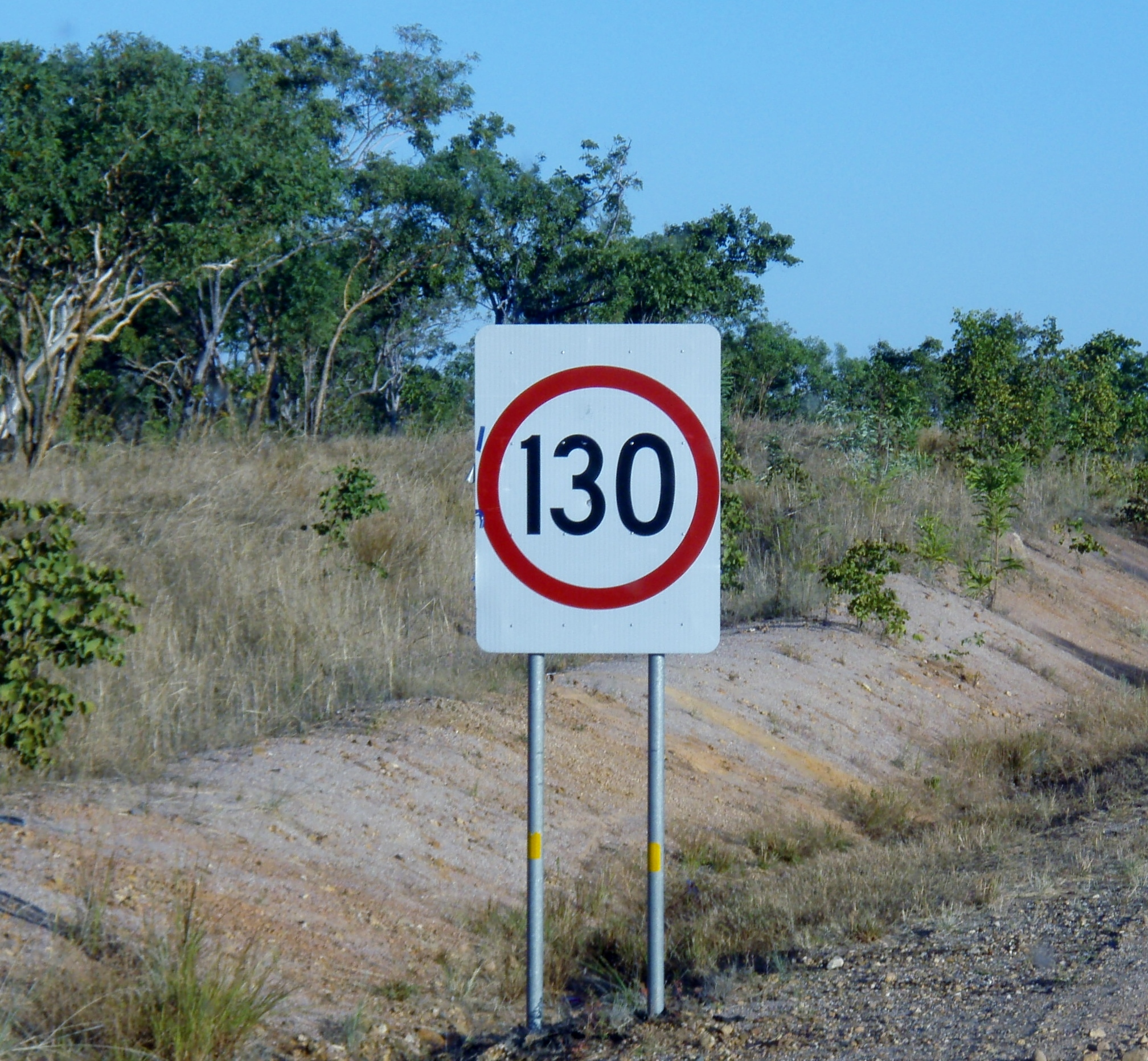
130 km/h speed limits are found on the Stuart, Barkly, Victoria and Arnhem Highways in the Northern Territory

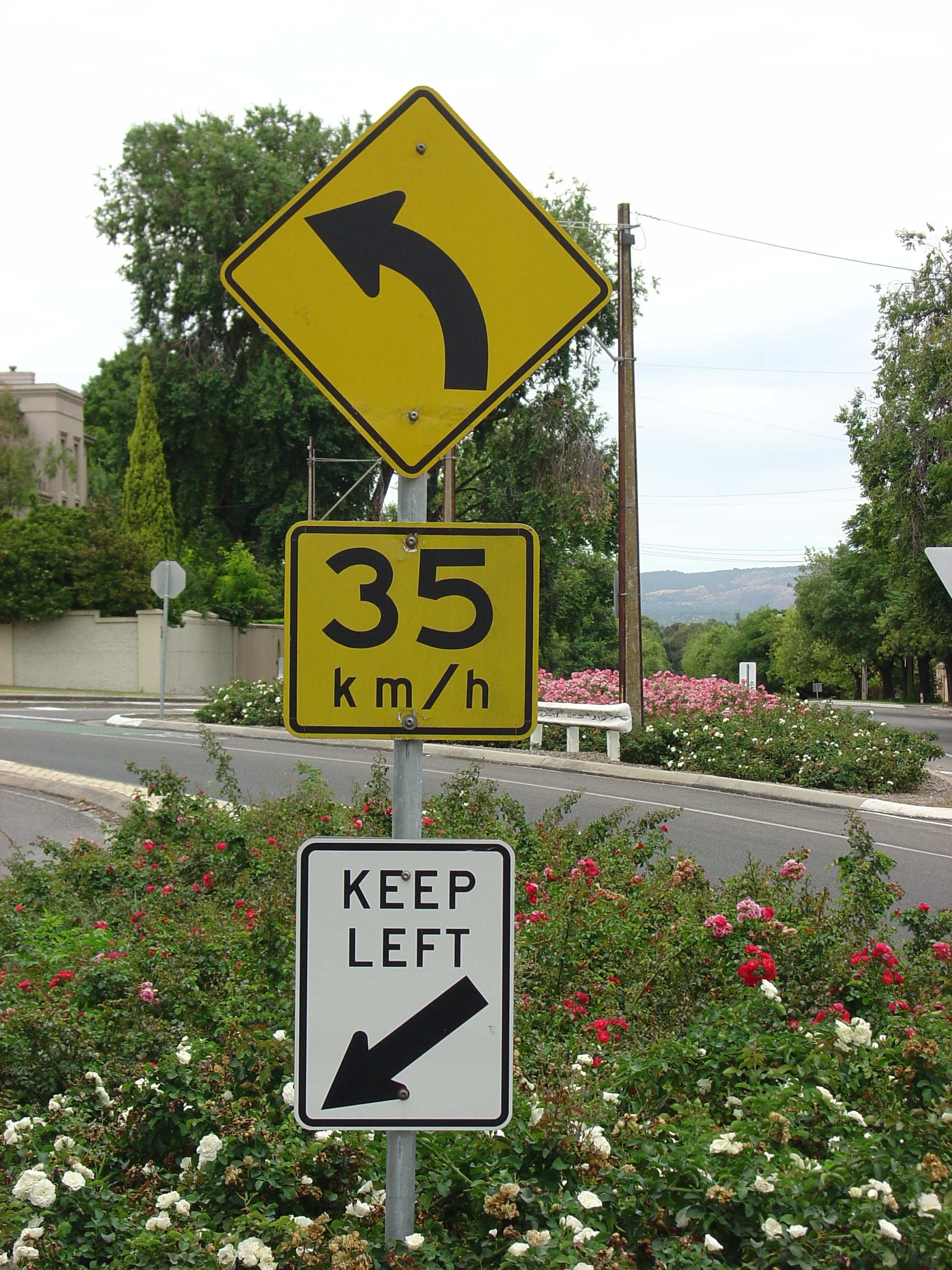
35 km/h speed advisory sign above a keep left sign

Australia uses different default speed limits for roads inside built-up areas and outside built-up areas. These apply automatically in the absence of speed limit signage and vary between the states and territories. The current default speed limits are:

- 50 km/h (31 mph) within built-up areas, except for the Northern Territory which remains at 60 km/h (37 mph)
- 80 km/h outside built-up areas on unsealed roads in Tasmania
- 100 km/h (62 mph) outside built-up areas in ACT, NSW, QLD, SA, TAS (sealed roads only), and VIC
- 110 km/h outside built-up areas in NT and WA

== Common limits ==
Common speed limits are:

- 10 km/h (6.2 mph) shared zones (signposted areas where pedestrians and motorised traffic share the same space)
- 30 km/h (19 mph) in areas where vehicles mix with people walking, cycling or using other forms of transport. 30 km/h limits are increasingly used in Australia on local streets and in high-pedestrian activity areas such as all local streets in Fitzroy and Collingwood.
- 40 km/h (25 mph) school zones are variable speed zones, with a limit applying during gazetted school days (which may include pupil-free days) at specific times of the day. In South Australia, the limit is 25 km/h (16 mph). Some speed limit signs in school zones include flashing lights, that turn on when the lower speed limit applies. In Western Australia, every school has a flashing speed limit sign, most of which are solar powered.
- 40 km/h high pedestrian activity zones, such as shopping and dining precincts, or whole suburbs such as Balmain, Rozelle and numerous regional and local streets in Sydney's Inner West.
- Many sub-arterial roads are zoned 60 km/h (37 mph).
- Major connector roads and smaller highways are zoned 60 km/h (37 mph), 70 km/h (43 mph), 80 km/h (50 mph) or 90 km/h (56 mph).
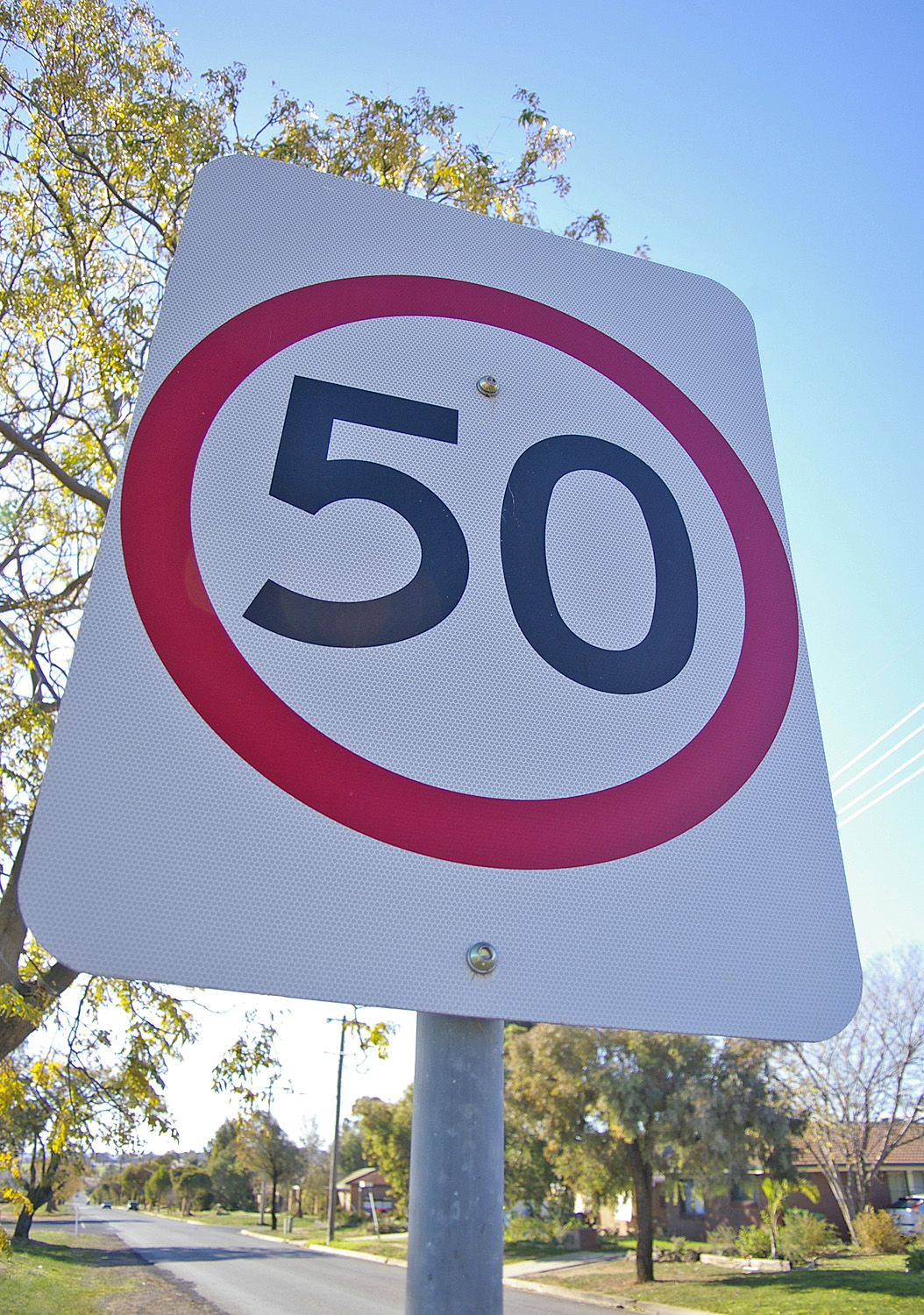
  50 km/h speed limit sign
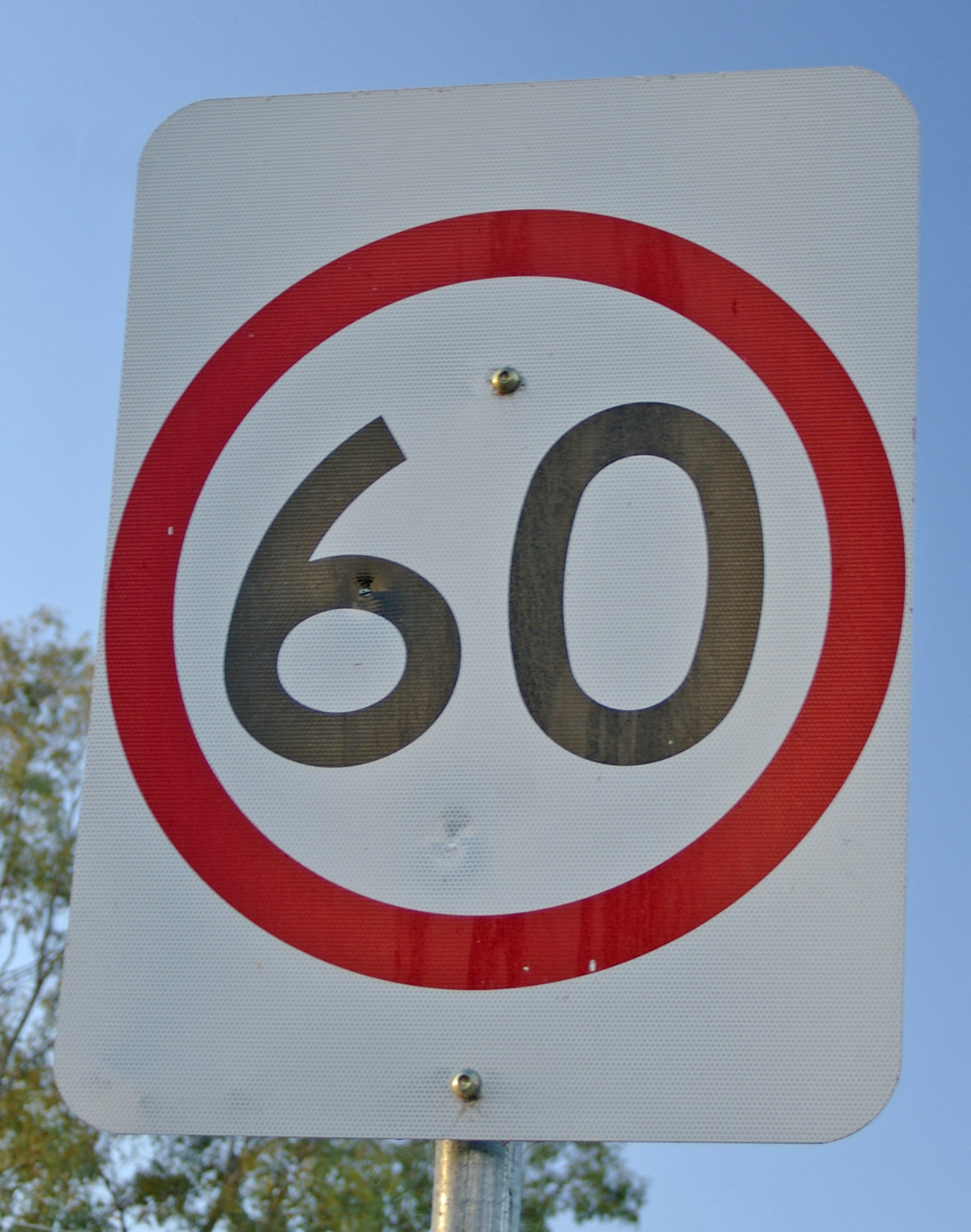
  60 km/h speed limit sign
- Some highways and freeways are zoned 110 km/h (68 mph).
- Most of the Stuart, Arnhem, Barkly and Victoria highways in the Northern Territory are zoned 130 km/h (81 mph).

The "END" speed limit sign is increasingly used throughout Australia to signal the end of a posted speed restriction, or built-up area "default" speed-limit leading to the jurisdiction's "rural" default speed limit. It contains the word "END" and a number in a black circle beneath this, representing the ceasing speed-limit. It is typically used where, according to AS1742.4 the road beyond has certain hazards such as hidden driveways, poor camber, soft edges and other hazards where the road authority feels a posted speed limit sign might be too dangerous or otherwise unwarranted. It is intended therefore to invoke particular caution. This sign is used as a direct replacement for the slash-through speed derestriction signs common in Europe and elsewhere.

Speed limits are enforced in all areas of the country. Tolerance is about 6 km/h in urban areas and 9 km/h on highways, depending on state regulations, so that driving at or below the tolerance speed will not incur a ticket. This is the case in South Australia, and other states have similar tolerances. One exception is Victoria, where they will deduct 2–4 km/h in from the speed reading, so that reasonable doubt is credited to the driver, especially given that earlier Australian Design Rules specified that vehicle speedometers may have up to 10% leeway in accuracy. This was updated in 2006 to require that the "speed indicated shall not be less than the true speed of the vehicle." Detection measures used are radar, LIDAR, fixed and mobile speed cameras (using various detection technologies), Vascar, pacing and aircraft.

== Speed limits by state and territory ==
Despite introduction of model national road rules by the states in 1999, Western Australia, Tasmania and the Northern Territory retain different default speed limits. The table below indicates the default speed limits along with typical school zone limits and the highest zone in each locality.

In the external territories, and in some special cases (such as Lord Howe Island, NSW), the speed limits may differ significantly from those found across the rest of the nation.

State / territory	School zone	Built-up area	Rural area	Highest speed zone
Australian Road Rules	number on school zone sign	50	100	N/A
Australian Capital Territory	40	50	100	100
New South Wales	40 on all roads 40 km/h or more 30 in designated 30 km/h high pedestrian activity areas	50	100	110
Northern Territory	40	60	110	130
Queensland	40 on roads 70 km/h or less 60 on roads 80 km/h and some 90/100 km/h 80 on roads 110 km/h and some 90/100 km/h	50	100	110
South Australia	25 on roads 60 km/h or less	50	100	110
Tasmania	40 on roads 70 km/h or less 60 on roads 80 km/h or more	50	80 (unsealed); 100 (sealed)	110
Victoria	30 in designated active travel precincts 40 on all roads 40 km/h or more (Note: On all roads 70 km/h or less before 2025); 60 on roads 80 km/h or more outside built-up areas (Note: On all roads 80 km/h or more before 2025)	50	100	110
Western Australia	40	50	110	110
External territories				
Christmas Island	40	40	90	90
Cocos (Keeling) Islands	--	30	50	50
Norfolk Island	30	30 - Kingston Foreshore; 40 - Burnt Pine Central Business District	30 - Norfolk Island National Park; 50 - Other areas	50
Special cases				
Lord Howe Island	--	--	--	25

== Limits for Learner, Provisional and Probationary licence holders ==
The table below indicates the different speed limits that apply for each state's licence holders.

The limits apply when the road's stated speed is above the licence's speed limit, e.g.: a person with a NSW P1 licence can drive at a max speed of 90 km/h on 100/110 km/h signed roads in any state. Conversely, a person with a Queensland provisional licence is not speed limited and can drive at the road's stated speed, even while in NSW where local provisional drivers are limited to 90 km/h.

State / territory	Learner	Provisional / Probationary
Australian Capital Territory	normal limit	normal limit
New South Wales	90	P1:90, P2:100
Northern Territory	80	100
Queensland	normal limit	normal limit
South Australia	100	100
Tasmania	90	P1:100, P2: normal limit
Victoria	normal limit	normal limit
Western Australia	100	normal limit

== Limits for trucks and buses ==
New South Wales has a limit of 100 km/h for heavy (more than 4.5 tonne) vehicles which is not a feature of the Australian Road Rules. Additionally particular heavy vehicles (some buses and vehicles more than 13.9 tonne) are required to have speed monitoring devices fitted.

== Signage ==
Standard speed limit sign

Restricted speed area sign

Local traffic area sign

Shared zone sign

School zone sign in NSW and Victoria

Speed limit ends sign

Restricted speed area ends sign

End shared zone sign

Advisory speed sign

Exit advisory speed sign

Speed limit change ahead sign

Community gateway speed limit sign in Victoria

== Historical limits ==
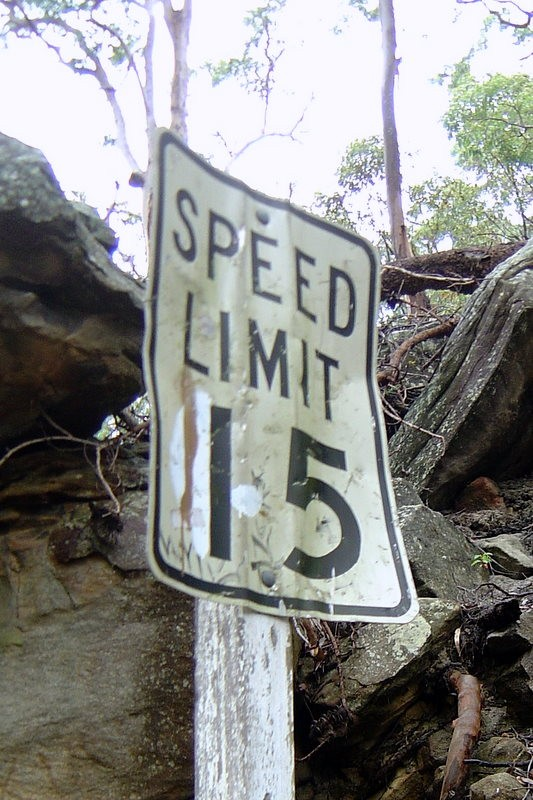
An old speed limit sign in New South Wales, signed in imperial system of units (15 mph speed limit, nowadays the 30 km/h speed limit). Prior to metrication, speed limit signs in Australia had the same design as the American MUTCD counterparts.

Historically, Australia operated a simple speed limit system of urban and rural default limits, denoted in miles per hour. As part of metrication in 1974, speed limits and speed advisories were converted into kilometres per hour, rounded to the nearest 10 km/h, leading to small discrepancies in speed limits. Also, the signage was changed from the design where the words "SPEED LIMIT" appear above the numeric limit (as specified in the current US MUTCD) to the design where the numeric limit is inscribed on a red circle (which is defined by the Vienna Convention and thus it became an international sign for speed limit).

=== Urban limits ===
The urban default, which prior to the 1930s was 30 mph (48 km/h), applied to any "built up area", usually defined by the presence of street lighting. Over the next 30 years, each of the states and territories progressively increased the limit to 35 mph (56 km/h), with New South Wales being the last to change in May 1964. South Australia adopted 35 mph (56 km/h) on 30 November 1950, along with the "new short-right hand turn" in place of a hook turn.

Metrication led to the default urban limits of 35 mph (56 km/h) being converted to 60 km/h, an increase of 3.7 km/h (2.3 mph).

At 60km/h, in 1996/1997 Australia had amongst the highest, if not the highest general urban speed limit in the world.

In the late 1990s and early 2000s, the 60 km/h (37 mph) urban default limit was progressively lowered to 50 km/h (31 mph) nationally for reasons of road, and especially pedestrian, safety. However, many existing roads, especially subarterial roads in urban areas, have had 60 km/h (37 mph) limits posted on them. Queensland's Manual of Uniform Traffic Control Devices (Speed Controls) states that 60 km/h (37 mph) is the general minimum speed limit for traffic-carrying roads. The Northern Territory has retained the 60 km/h (37 mph) limit; however, 50 km/h (31 mph) is also a common speed limit (particularly in residential areas).

=== Rural limits ===
Outside of built up areas, a prima facie speed limit applied. In New South Wales and Victoria, speed limit was 50 miles per hour (80 km/h in New South Wales after metrication). In the 1970s however, most state speed limits were gradually replaced by absolute limits. An absolute speed limit of 70 mph (113 km/h) was introduced to Victoria in 1971, as a trial. This was subsequently reduced to 60 mph (97 km/h) in late 1973. South Australia introduced an absolute speed limit of 65 mph (105 km/h) in 1974.

With metrication in 1974, the rural defaults of 60 mph (97 km/h) and 65 mph (105 km/h) became 100 km/h (62 mph) and 110 km/h (68 mph) respectively. The 50 mph limit in New South Wales became a limit of 80 km/h.

New South Wales introduced an absolute speed limit of 100 km/h (62 mph) in 1979, replacing the limit of 80 km/h (50 mph) The Northern Territory introduced an absolute speed limit of 110 km/h (68 mph) in 2007, along with 130 km/h (81 mph) zones on the Territory's four major highways.

==== NT open speed limits ====
The Northern Territory had no blanket speed limits outside major towns until January 2007, when a general rural speed limit of 110 km/h (68 mph) was introduced, although four major highways had higher 130 km/h (81 mph) zones. Speed-limit advocates note that the per-capita fatality rate in 2006 was the highest in the OECD and twice the Australian average. In 2009, the opposition (Country Liberal Party) unsuccessfully sought the removal of the 130 km/h (81 mph) limits on three out of the four highways where it applied, arguing that total fatalities in the Northern Territory had increased significantly during the first two years of the speed limit. In argument against the motion, the government provided more detailed statistics than normally published; these statistics showed a reduction in fatalities along the highways where 130 km/h (81 mph) limits were introduced. In 2011 the opposition argued for a return to "open speed limits" . For the 2012 election the Country Liberals' transport policy promised an evidence-based approach. After winning government, de-restriction of Stuart Highway was proposed; a planned 12-month de-restriction was initiated on 1 February 2014. The trial on 200 km (120 mi) of Stuart Highway was expanded later in the year to another 72 km (45 mi), and continued indefinitely in January 2015 during a review of the initial results since "in the first 11 months, there were no recorded fatalities." From September 2015, a 336 km (209 mi) stretch of Stuart Highway between Barrow Creek and Alice Springs had speed limits removed for a 12-month trial. 130 km/h (81 mph) speed limits were restored on 20 November 2016 due to the electoral loss of the Country Liberal Party.

=== Derestriction signs in NSW ===
Speed derestriction sign

Often the start of rural default 'limits' or prima facie allowances were signalled by use of the speed derestriction sign, catalogued R4-2 in AS1742.4. (2009 edition has dropped from reference the R4-2 speed derestriction). The speed derestriction sign (//) had developed 'different meaning' over time at state and territory level, although its contract-meaning under Vienna Convention on Road Signs and Signals where the sign is catalogued C17a is "End of all local prohibitions imposed on moving vehicles" and has never changed. In the Northern Territory, they designated the end of speed restrictions. In Victoria and Western Australia they meant that the rural default speed limit applied, whilst in New South Wales, they indicated that the prima facie 50 mph (80 km/h) limit applied.

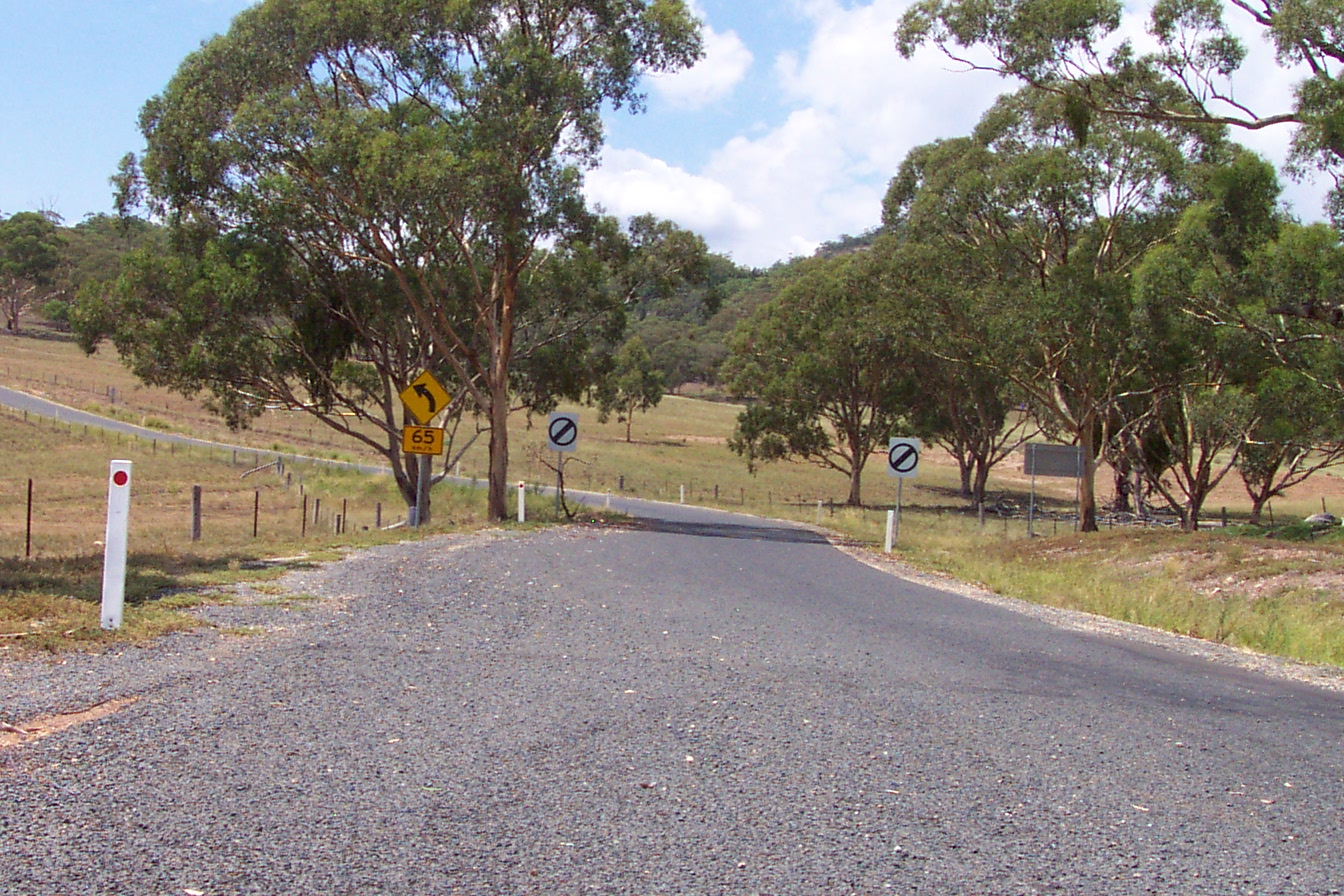
A derestriction signs in NSW photographed in 2007

New South Wales's prima facie 50 mph (80 km/h) limit, often signed by derestriction signs, was only enforced in cases where a driver's speed could be demonstrated to be excessive or dangerous in the context of prevailing road conditions. This was somewhat similar in principle to "reasonable and prudent" limits in other jurisdictions. This led to the widespread but misleading belief that no limit applied, and that derestriction signs indicated an "unlimited" limit. This belief, coupled with repeated studies showing 85th percentile speeds in excess of 120 km/h (75 mph) on major routes, comparatively high road tolls, difficulty in prosecuting speeding offences, and the variance in meaning of the derestriction sign across states, led New South Wales to harmonise its rural default limit to 100 km/h (62 mph) in 1979. The use of derestriction signs in New South Wales was officially discouraged, and on state controlled routes, 100 km/h (62 mph) signs were progressively used instead.

== Proposed limits ==
The National Road Safety Strategy 2021-30 recommended the development of a national guide for "best practice and consistent speed limit setting to prevent fatal and serious injuries to vulnerable road users including consideration of reviewing the default speed in built-up areas".

=== Open road default speed limit ===
In December 2025 a federal proposal to reduce speed limits on some country roads from 100km/h to 80km/h was dumped after 7 years of consideration. The proposal would have required the limits to be set at 80km/h unless a higher limit could be justified on engineering grounds. It was dumped 11 days after "about 11,000" submissions were received.

=== 30km/h urban speed limit ===
Introducing 30km/h speed limits in urban residential areas would reduce the annual number of lives lost on Australian roads by 13 per cent.

One of the "main recommendations" of the Independent Review of NSW Speed Zoning Standard in 2023 was to "Explore use of 30 km/h speed zones outside schools".

In 2023, the City of Sydney filed a formal request with Transport for NSW to lower the city center limit to 30 km/h. In June 2024, Transport for NSW was in "early planning discussions" for 30km/h speed zoning for the Sydney CBD, including Millers Point.

In July 2024 there was significant media coverage regarding the City of Sydney's proposal to reduce speeds in the Sydney CBD to 30km/h. On 10 July, Business Sydney called on John Graham to urge the NSW Government to intervene to prevent changing speed limits on Sydney CBD streets from 50km/h to 40km/h, and opposed 30km/h. The next day, Chris Minns claimed 30km/h in Sydney was over the top and that "You could walk quicker than that." A 16 July Daily Telegraph article (published in the July 17 newspaper) stated "Premier Chris Minns last week signalled he’d oppose the drop to 30km/h...". Ben Fordham interviewed the Transport for NSW Secretary Josh Murray the same day on 2GB, and confirmed there was no plan to reduce speed limits to 30km/h in the city. As of January 2025, Transport for NSW hadn't rejected any 30km/h requests, however were not actively progressing reviews based on the statement in this radio interview.

In 2025 the New South Wales Greens introduced a bill to reduce the limit in residential streets from 50km/h to 30km/h. Business Sydney opposed the reduction claiming it would cause "red tape and confusion". The New South Wales Liberal Party opposed the legislation. Mark Coure stated the Opposition believes speed limit decisions should "continue to be made by the experts within their local communities, supported by Transport for NSW and in partnership with local members, councillors and the communities they represent", and that "nothing in the current framework prevents lower speed limits from being introduced".

In 2025 the Speed Zoning Policy published by the Victorian Department of Transport and Planning recommended a 30km/h limit in built-up areas where pedestrians frequently cross the road.

=== NSW Speed Management Program ===
New South Wales has a Speed Management Program where speed limits are set in accordance with the NSW Speed Zoning Standard. Funding allocation for the Speed Management Program was reduced from $5 million in FY2024/25 to $4.5 million in FY 2025/26.

As of 13 March 2025, 324 speed zone reviews were completed in NSW in the then-incomplete 2024/25 financial year. 259 of these reviews were completed in rural, and 65 were completed in urban areas.

Speed zone reviews are "technical assessments rather than applications for a specific speed".

As of June 2026, there were 55.2km of 30km/h zones across NSW.

== See also ==
- Australian Road Rules
