= National Transport Commission =

Australian Transport commission

Agency overview
- Formed: 15 January 1992; 34 years ago
- Preceding agency: Transport and Infrastructure Council
- Jurisdiction: Australian Government
- Agency executive: Michael Hopkins, Chief Executive Officer (since 2023)
- Website: www.ntc.gov.au

The National Transport Commission (NTC), previously known as the National Road Transport Commission, is an Australian statutory body created to develop regulatory and operational reform for road, rail and intermodal transport.

Under Australia's federal system, transport policy and regulatory responsibilities span across Commonwealth, state and territory, and local governments. Differences between these regulatory systems mean that national transport operators can face inconsistent regulations, creating unnecessary inefficiency and cost.

The NTC is focused on reforms which improve the productivity, safety and environmental outcomes of the Australian transport system. Its work includes delivering a National Rail Action Plan to make rail more interoperable, developing an end-to-end regulatory framework for automated vehicles, improving the National Heavy Vehicle law, maintaining the Australian Dangerous Goods Code and maintaining national model laws, including the Australian Road Rules.

The NTC also plays a role in implementation planning to ensure reform outcomes are relevant and effective. Recommendations and advice are presented to Australia's transport ministers through the Infrastructure and Transport Ministers' Meeting - for approval by majority vote.

Based in Melbourne, the NTC has six commissioners including a Chief Executive. CEO Michael Hopkins was appointed in 2023.

== History ==
=== Hughes & Vale case ===
Australia is a federation that relies on the Constitution to divide power between the Commonwealth (federal) government and the six original States (see federalism in Australia). As the Commonwealth of Australia Constitution Act did not specify Federal control over road transport, it effectively relinquished full jurisdiction of that area to the States.

In 1952, truck drivers were frustrated by the levies on interstate road transport, which were designed to protect the state-owned railways. They placed a copy of the constitution in a barrow and pushed it by hand between Melbourne and Sydney. This journey took 11 days, 2 days quicker than a parcel mailed at the same time and carried by rail.

Their purpose was to challenge the validity of the New South Wales State Transport Act against "Section 92 of the Constitution which provides that trade, commerce and intercourse between the States shall be absolutely free".

Known as the Hughes & Vale case, they eventually led a successful constitutional challenge in the High Court which opened-up the development of interstate road transport and Australia in general.

Hughes & Vale was a significant turning point for the transport industry in Australia. It was the catalyst for the growth of interstate road transport, which in turn highlighted the limitations of having different road transport regulations between states.

=== Razorback Blockade ===
In 1979, 3000 truck drivers staged blockages of major highways at nearly 40 locations in Queensland, Victoria, New South Wales and South Australia to protest against ton-mile taxes and low freight rates. Known as the Razorback Blockade (for a blockage of the Hume Highway at the top of Razorback Mountain, near Picton, New South Wales) truck drivers involved claimed higher charges made them financially worse off. Their efforts were not in vain and ton-mile tax was abolished shortly after the protests.

Apart from charging woes, there was also a demand for a list of reforms such as the establishment of advisory bodies to solve problems in the industry, equal pay for all drivers, licensing to control the number of trucks in the industry and uniform weight and speed limits to be implemented.

=== Establishment of the National Road Transport Commission ===
Both the Hughes & Vale case and the Razorback blockade were contributing factors to the recommendation in the last report of the Inter-State Commission (ISC) proposing significant changes be made for all vehicle charges, and that a National Commission be created.

At the time, microeconomic reform was a central policy of the Labor Commonwealth government. The cooperation of all six States and two Territories was needed as many of its high priority agendas such as transport, and electricity generation and distribution were State governed.

The assembly of leaders at the Special Premiers Conference in 1991, including the notable support of Premier Nick Greiner of New South Wales, a non-Labor Government, gave bipartisan support to the reform process.

In 1991, the National Road Transport Commission was formally established by an inter-governmental agreement.

== 2002 review ==
Under its enabling legislation, the NTC's role and performance must be reviewed every six years by independent steering committee.

The 2002 review of the National Road Transport Commission Act recommended that the NRTC's role be expanded to include rail and intermodal transport to encourage a more holistic approach to land transport reforms.

Rail transport regulations in Australia are also governed by States and Territories and, like road transport, culminated in a number of inconsistencies across the nation. It was noted rail transport system in Australia was ready for a more formal process of reform parallel to that of road transport and that operators and track owners on the national road network needed consistent processes for safety regulation. High priority issues targeted for rail regulatory reform included the establishment of a framework to improve and strengthen the co-regulatory system including application of mutual recognition, and the development of a national policy on key safety issues such as fatigue, testing for drugs and alcohol and medical fitness of safety-critical rail workers.

In 2004, the National Road Transport Commission was formally renamed the National Transport Commission to accommodate the inclusion of rail and intermodal transport into its existing mandate. Consequently, the existing National Road Transport Commission Act 1991 was replaced by the National Transport Commission Act 2003.

=== The National Transport Advisory Council (NTAC) ===
Also included in the 2002 review of the NRTC was a recommendation for the creation of a non-statutory body called the National Transport Advisory Council (NTAC). The proposed function of NTAC was to conduct strategic analyses and give advice to the ATC on strategic priorities for national infrastructure investment, options for pricing of access to road, rail and other transport infrastructure and directions and priorities for modal integration relevant to national freight issues.

The long term intention was for functions of the NTAC to be transferred through to the National Transport Commission after three years if agreed upon unanimously by the ATC. Despite the recommendation, NTAC was never implemented.

== 2009 review ==
A steering committee was appointed in January 2009 to conduct a review and delivered its final report to the Chair of the Australian Transport Council (ATC, the predecessor to SCOTI) in August 2009. The Coalition of Australian Governments (COAG) and the ATC endorsed the recommendations in December 2009.

Key recommendations which were endorsed included:

- Explicitly expanding the NTC's mandate to include working with jurisdictions to develop viable implementation plans
- Monitoring and evaluating national reform outcomes using a broader range of tools, including data collection, post-implementation research and effectiveness reviews
- Focusing on priority projects set by the ATC and regularly reporting on project progress
- The NTC Commissioners to be appointed as a governing board under the Public Governance, Performance and Accountability Act 2013.

== Effectiveness ==
The commission's early projects led to major gains in many areas of road transport, particularly in the heavy vehicle sector. Widely praised early reforms delivered included charges, registration, dangerous goods, licensing, vehicle standards and mass and access. The delivery of the Australian Road Rules in 1999 represented a major reform initiative touching both the light and heavy vehicle sectors.

== Current reform projects ==
Some of the reform projects currently being undertaken or commencing in 2023 include:

- National Rail Action Plan and rail reform to improve interoperability, harmonisation of standards and components and develop a skilled workforce for the future
- Heavy vehicle national law review to improve safety and productivity
- Review of the Australian Road Rules - Release of new medical standard for rail safety workers
- Preparations for the safe introduction of autonomous vehicles onto Australian roads
- Heavy vehicle charges determination and development of a forward-looking cost base
- Reporting on carbon dioxide emissions from Australian light vehicles
- Encouraging women into transport careers through the National Women in Transport initiative.

== Organisational timeline ==
- 1991 – NRTC is formally established with Gordon Amedee as Chairman and Neil Aplin as Chief Executive Officer (CEO).
- 1993 – New appointment, John Hurlstone, Chairman.
- 1996 – New appointment, David O’Sullivan, CEO.
- 1998 – New appointment, Stuart Hicks, Chairman and Jim Stevenson, CEO.
- 2001 – New appointment, Tony Wilson, CEO.
- 2004 - National Road Transport Commission is formally renamed National Transport Commission (NTC)
- 2006 – New appointment, Michael Deegan, Chairman and Nick Dimopoulos, CEO.
- 2009 – New appointment, Greg Martin, Chairman.

2023- New appointment, Michael Hopkins CEO

== See also ==
- Australian Road Rules
- List of Australian Commonwealth Government entities
- Transport in Australia
