= Motorcycle headlamp modulator =

Accessory device for motorcycles

A motorcycle headlamp modulator (or simply headlamp modulator) is an accessory device that oscillates the intensity of a motorcycle headlamp at 240 ±40 cycles per minute (~4 Hz) between approximately 20% and 100% of full intensity. The headlight operates at full intensity 50-70% of the time. United States and Canadian regulations require headlight modulators to include a light sensor that disables modulation when the ambient light level drops below a certain point. When this happens, the headlamps burn steadily.

== Purpose ==
Motorcycles in the United States since 1978 have been wired so as to operate the low-beam headlamp whenever the engine is running. This is not required by any federal regulation but rather is a matter of voluntary industry policy. However, as increasing numbers of vehicles are equipped with daytime running lights, daytime-illuminated motorcycle headlamps may no longer provide a significant conspicuity benefit. Some motorcyclists install headlamp modulators in the belief they increase motorcycle conspicuity in traffic.

== Science ==
While there are no studies supporting the headlamp modulator as an effective motorcycle safety device, some research suggests headlamp modulators may increase the conspicuity of motorcycles.

== Legality ==
=== North America ===
In the United States, Federal Motor Vehicle Safety Standard 108, which regulates all automotive lighting devices and systems, permits motorcycle headlamp modulation systems provided they comply with the performance, operation, and durability requirements contained therein Canada's analogous regulation, Canada Motor Vehicle Safety Standard 108, likewise permits headlamp modulators that meet the same technical requirements as those in force in the USA.

== See also ==
- Headlight flashing
- Motorcycle safety
- Wig-wag (automobile)
