= TIRTL =

Multi-purpose traffic sensor

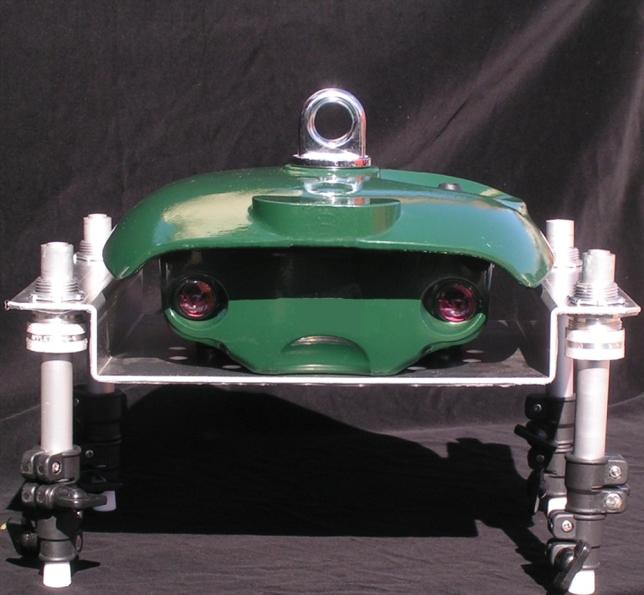
TIRTL receiver on a portable stand (the device is more commonly built into a curb)

The Infra-Red Traffic Logger, more commonly known simply by the acronym TIRTL, is a multi-purpose traffic sensor that can be used as a traffic counter, speed sensor, red light camera sensor, heavy vehicle tracker, overheight vehicle sensor, rail crossing sensor and network management system. The initial development of the device started in 1997 in conjunction with the New South Wales Roads & Traffic Authority and started commercial domestic and international sales in 2002. It is currently in use in sixteen countries.

It uses infrared light cones sent from a transmitter to a receiver situated on opposite sides of the road perpendicular to the flow of traffic. It has the ability to classify, record speed, and record volume for motor vehicles. The unit's data logging capabilities are enhanced by several flexible options for output. These options allow for real time applications, such as variable message sign triggering and traffic enforcement, as well as data logging for statistical purposes.

== Overview ==
TIRTL (The Infra-Red Traffic Logger) is manufactured by CEOS Pty Ltd, and marketed by CEOS Industrial. The device was initially developed in 1997 in conjunction with the New South Wales Roads & Traffic Authority, before the company received a grant from the Government of Australia in 1998 to develop it further before commercial sales started in 2002. It is currently in use in Australia, New Zealand, the Netherlands, Belgium, Luxembourg, Norway, Germany, Denmark, Sweden, South Africa, Turkey, India, Singapore, the United States, Canada, and Mexico. The device is currently in its third generation.

It has the ability to record volume, speed, and classification on a bi-directional, multi-lane roadway. Primary applications for this device include speed verification for enforcement purposes, traffic volume and density data collection for both statistical and real time usage, and vehicle classification by axle spacing. The device is usable in both portable and fixed applications, due to its communication capabilities and rugged enclosure. The unit was originally developed to provide secondary verification for intersection speed and red light cameras deployed in the state of Victoria, Australia. It was first deployed in Australia in July 1998. The unit was introduced to the North American market during the 2004 North American Travel Monitoring Exhibition and Conference (NAMTEC), and was first deployed in May 2006.

== Operations ==
=== Detection Method ===
This system consists of a receiver unit and transmitter unit placed on opposite sides of the road perpendicular to the direction of travel. The transmitter sends two cones of infrared light across the roadway, and the receiver records vehicles as they break and remake these cones. TIRTL transmitter's infrared cones cross each other and form two straight and two diagonal beam pathways. When a vehicle crosses the beam pathways, TIRTL records two beam events; it records one from the vehicle breaking and one leaving the beam pathway. These two beams events are recorded for all four beam pathways. Thus, eight timestamped events are generated per axle. The velocity is derived from the timestamps of these beam events.

Since the velocity of each vehicle wheel is known and a timestamp is recorded for each axle crossing each beam, the interwheel (or interaxle) spacings can be determined. Once the interaxle spacings are known, it is compared to a table of interaxle spacing ranges stored in the unit to determine the correct classification of the vehicle. The results are stored on a per vehicle basis.

=== Classification ===
The unit has a single-board computer running Linux. The computer interprets the supplied traffic classification table (Federal Highway Administration Scheme F, or user supplied) and composes the axle events caused by the parallel beam breaks into a classified vehicle. The classification data is stored in the unit and can optionally be streamed in real-time via a serial or an Ethernet connection. The raw beam event information can also be saved to the unit for verification purposes. The data is output as plain text. Thus, it can be translated to many common file formats used in traffic data collection.

=== Features ===
The devices has two RS-232 ports for data transfer. There are optional inbuilt GSM, PSTN, and satellite phone modems available. The unit has the ability to stream traffic information real-time which can drive intelligent traffic signs and send data back to traffic operation centers. There are also adapters available for connection to traffic cameras for enforcement purposes.

== Studies and approvals ==
- The Australian National Measurement Institute tested the accuracy of the vehicle velocity measurement. They found that there was a 1% deviation at 156 miles per hour (251 km/h).
- TIRTL was reviewed by the Minnesota Department of Transportation. In conjunction with 16 participating state departments of transportation, they conducted a pooled fund study called Portable Non-Intrusive Traffic Detection System (PNITDS). The final report stated that TIRTL correctly classified 94% and 97% of the total vehicles polled.
- TIRTL is under review by the Hawaii Department of Transportation for use as the chief sensor in their traffic monitoring system. The system is in competition with other non-intrusive traffic collection devices.
- In November 2008, the state of New South Wales, Australia, approved the device for use as a sensor for speed measurement.

== See also ==
- Road traffic control
- Traffic counter
- Road speed limit enforcement in Australia
