= Wig-wag (automobile) =

Vehicle headlight flashing mechanism

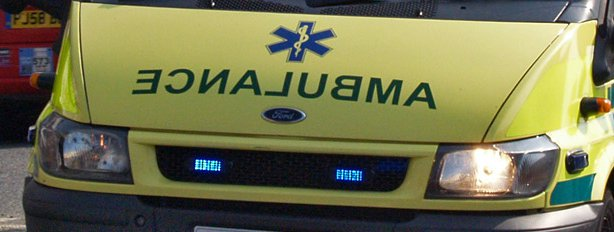
A British ambulance displaying the operation of a wig-wag: only one headlight operates at a time, with the two flashing alternately at a preset rate

A wig-wag is a device for flashing an automobile's headlights, so that only one of the two headlights operates at a time, with the two flashing at a preset rate. In its traditional form, a wig-wag emits the right and left headlights alternately, with each lamp usually lit for around half a second at a time. In the United Kingdom, the wig-wag is only seen on the road on emergency vehicles. The 'standard' wig-wag is often used within a cycle of other illumination patterns, such as swiftly alternating the left and right headlights, alternating the left and right headlights slowly, or flashing both headlights together, and using a mixture of high- and low-beams.

Although the use of flashing headlights does increase the visibility of any vehicle, it can also create problems. When high-beam headlights are flashed, the wig-wag may create glare or temporarily blind the drivers of oncoming vehicles.

Generally, wig-wags are prohibited on all vehicles except emergency vehicles. However, the road rules in New South Wales, Australia, and some areas in the United States allow school buses to have flashing headlights. In New South Wales specifically, additional wig-wag lights (separate from the headlights) are used on all public transport buses. In the United States, motorcycles are similarly allowed to be equipped with a headlamp modulator to increase visibility during the day. In the United States specifically, separate wig-wag lights are used on all public transport buses, and such buses can use white or clear lights to increase visibility during the daytime.

== See also ==
- Daytime running lamp
- Emergency vehicle lighting
- Motorcycle headlamp modulator
