= Australian Road Rules =

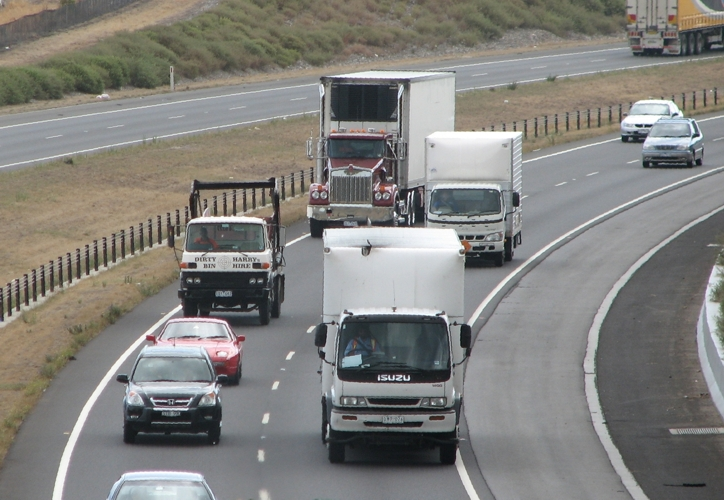
Cars and trucks in traffic on the Craigieburn bypass of the Hume Freeway north of Melbourne

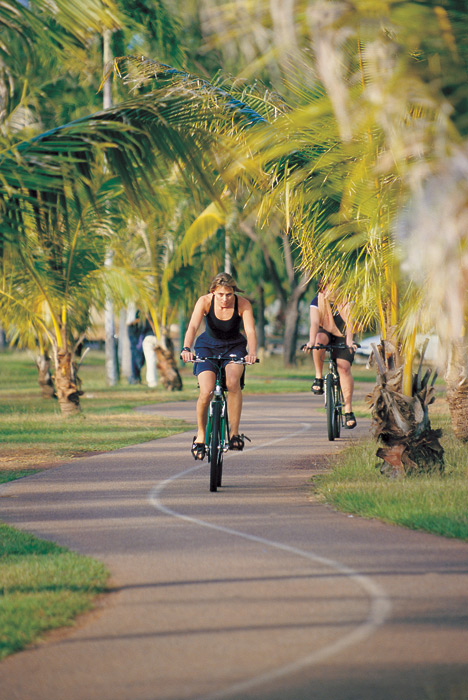
Cyclists on a shared path at Nightcliff, Northern Territory

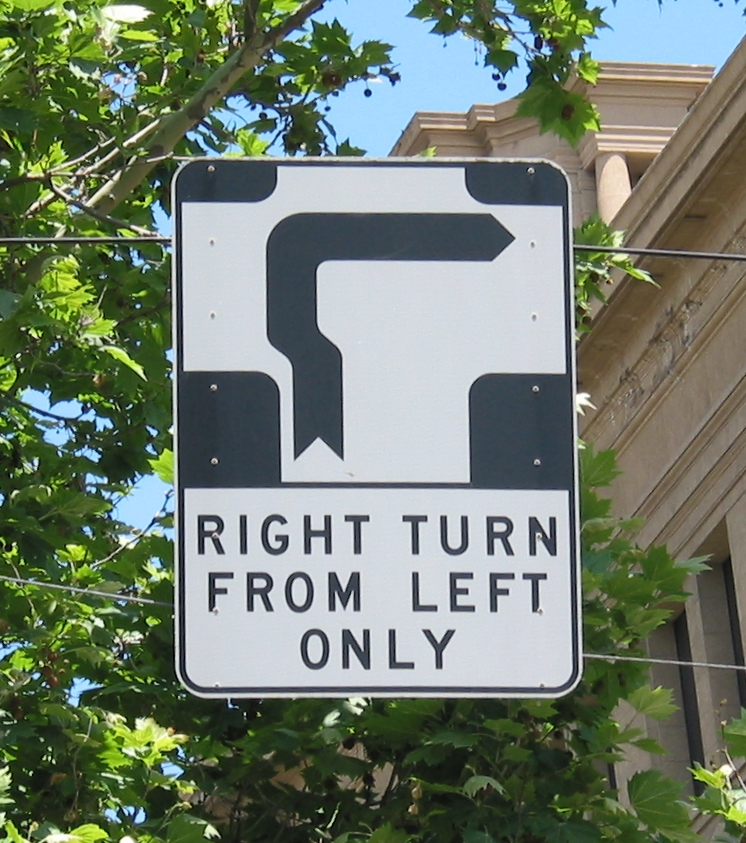
A hook turn sign in Melbourne

The Australian Road Rules are a set of model road rules developed by the National Road Transport Commission which form the basis for state and territory road rules across Australia. The first edition of the rules was published on 19 October 1999, after decades of working towards a shared road safety policy with officials from jurisdictions across Australia. Australians drive on the left.

== History ==
The Constitution of Australia does not provide the federal government legislative power for road transport law. As such, road laws are the responsibility of state and territory parliaments. Historically, there were many differences between the eight sets of traffic rules in force in Australia, for example, the penalties for traffic offences varied and there were differing rules governing the approach to intersections. Calls for a set of uniform road rules for Australia came as early as 1933.

The first genuine attempt to establish national Road Rules was in 1947 when Australian transport ministers (constituted as the Australian Transport Advisory Council) established the Australian Road Traffic Code Committee. The first version of a National Traffic Code was issued in 1958 and the last in 1988. It was not applied uniformly across the country: some jurisdictions adopted parts of the Code; others ignored significant parts of it.

In 1963 the Secretary of the Department of the Interior, Richard Kingsland, convened the 13th meeting of the Australian Road Traffic Committee and called for states to be flexible and to compromise to achieve a national traffic code. By 1965, the Australian Transport Advisory Council had prepared recommendations for nationwide standards for a national road law, for considerations by the states.

The Australian Road Rules project was established in the early 1990s, aimed at establishing a model set of road rules that states and territories across Australia could adopt in their local laws to create improved national uniformity or consistency. Responsibility for the project was passed to the National Road Transport Commission in 1995.

In January 1999, the Australian Transport Council (comprising each of Australia's transport ministers) voted to approve the final draft Rules submitted by the National Road Transport Commission, the Commonwealth and all states and territories except Western Australia approved the rules. The first edition of the rules was published on 19 October 1999 and was available for formal adoption by states and territories from December 1999.

== Status ==
The rules are a template only; the actual laws are those legislated by each state and territory. However most states and territories have adopted the rules as legislation, with minor variations.

== Current activity ==
The National Transport Commission is charged with maintaining the Australian Road Rules. From time to time, the commission develops maintenance packages for the Rules which are submitted to the Australian Transport Council for the approval of Australia's Transport Ministers and for the ultimate adoption and roll out across the states and territories.

== Gallery ==
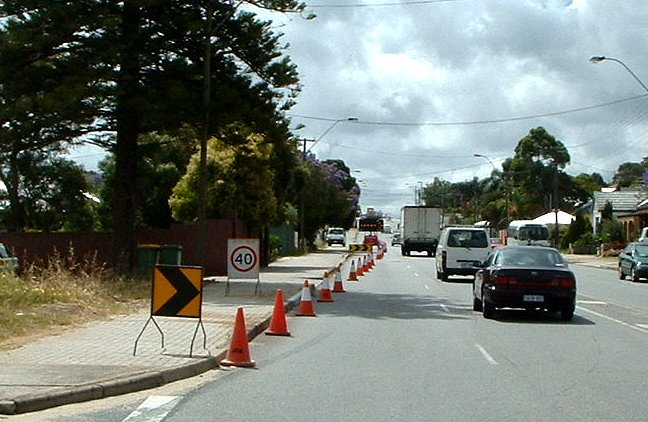
Cone taper for left lane closure in Western Australia showing small chevron (shifter), 40 km/h repeater, chevron and arrow-board

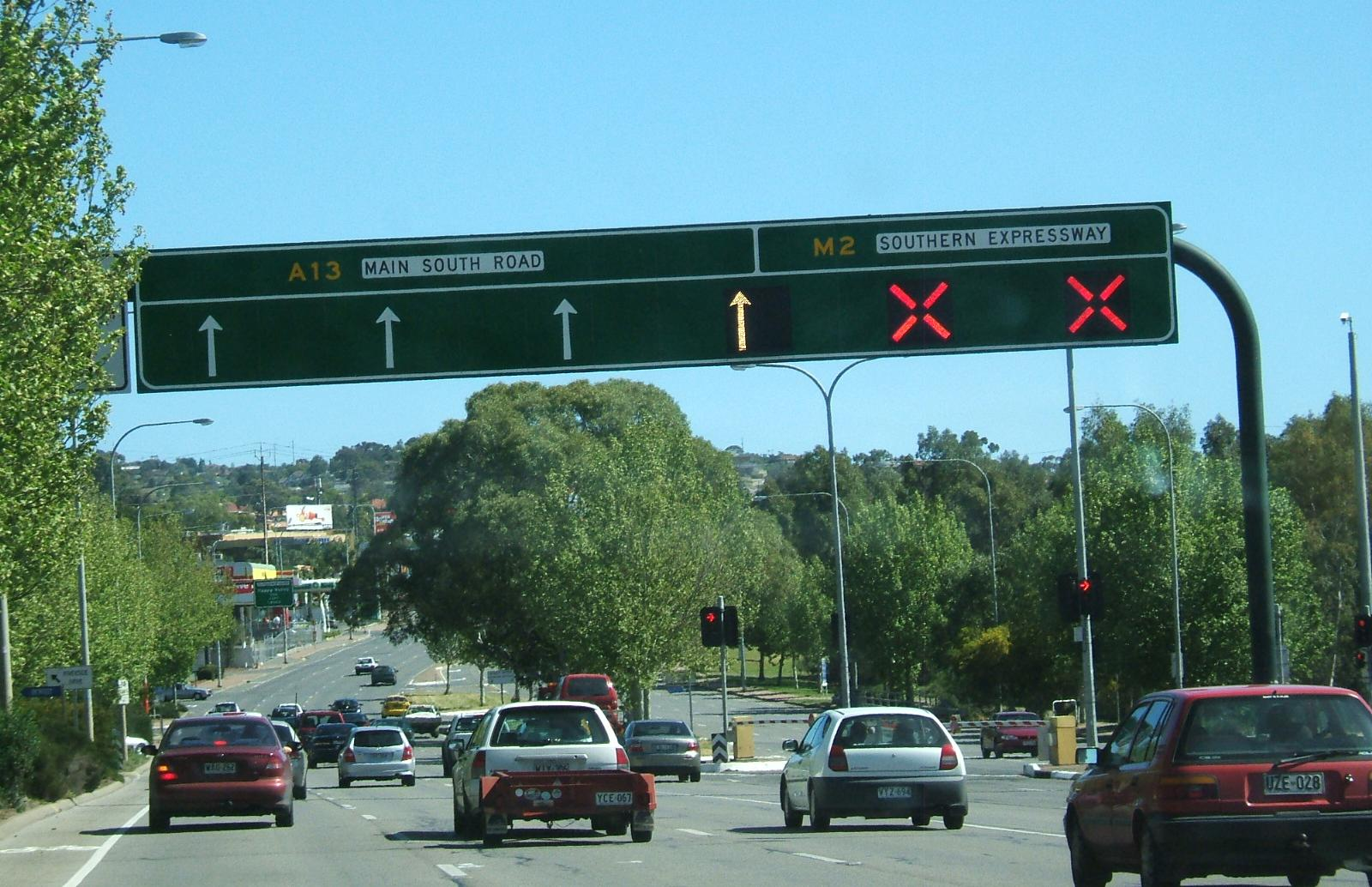
Traffic on the Southern Expressway, Adelaide

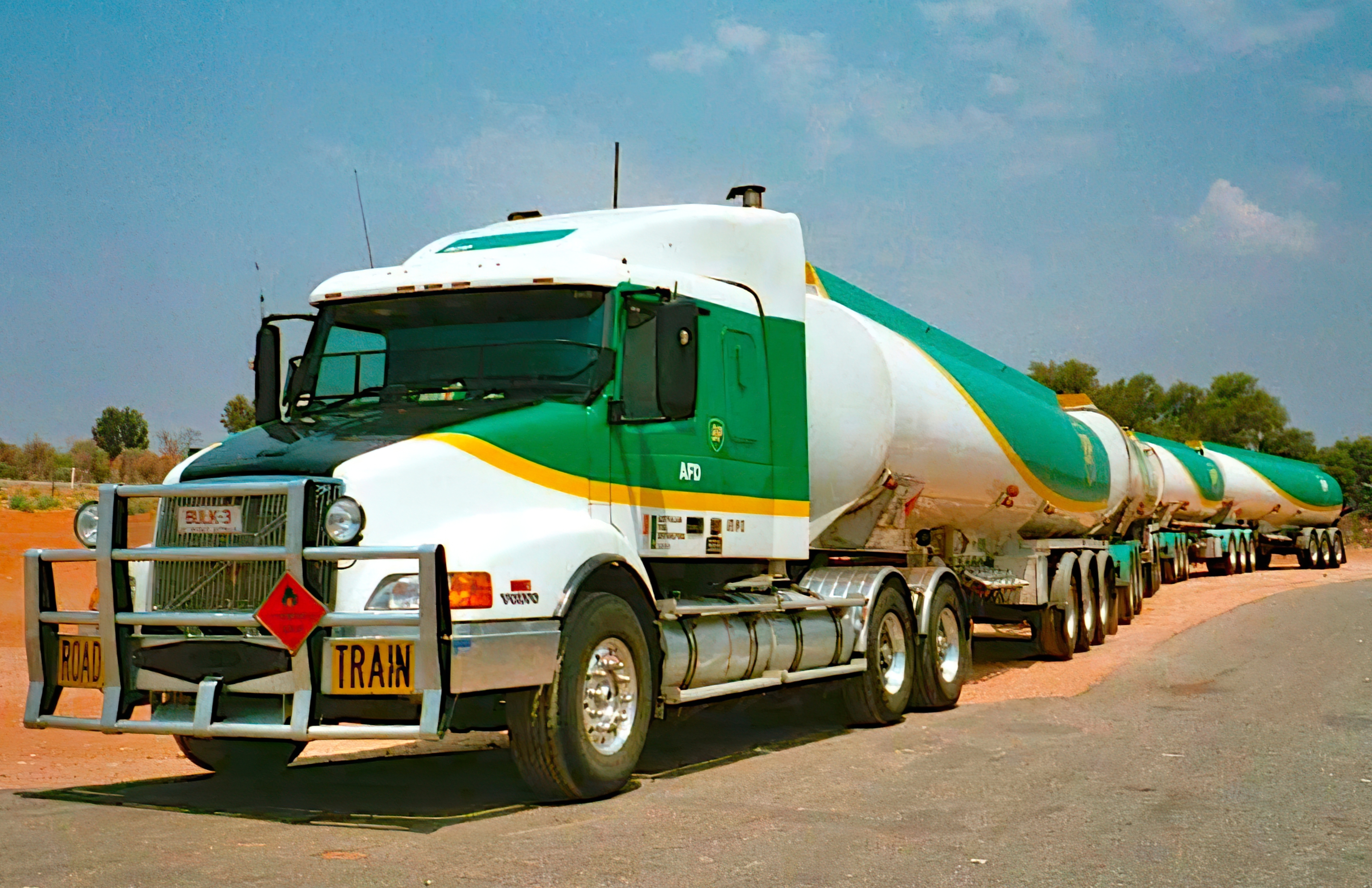
A tanker road train on an outback road. The Australian Road Rules apply to any heavy or light vehicle that operates on Australian roads.

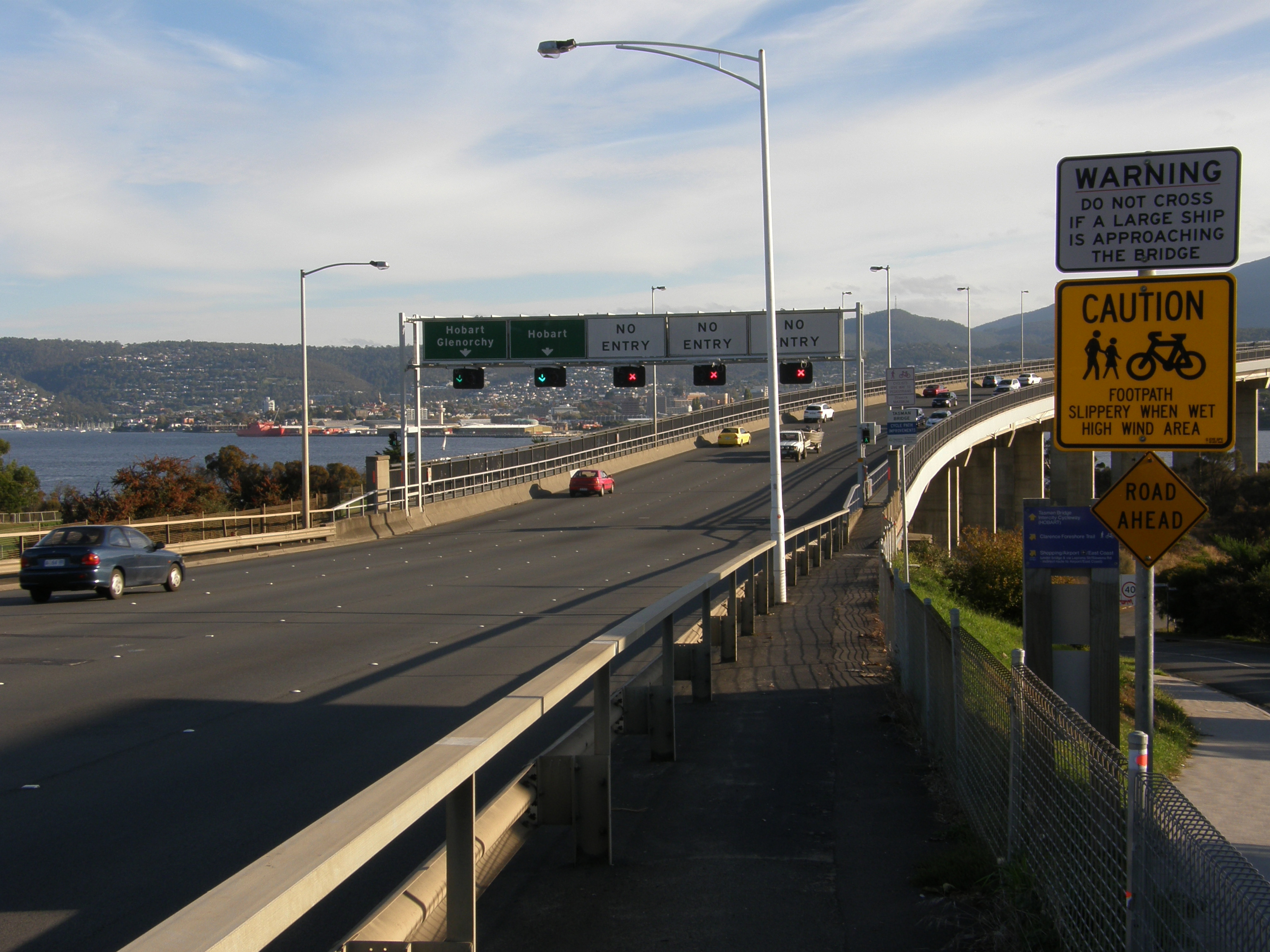
Traffic on the Tasman Bridge in Hobart
