= Metrication in Australia =

Adoption of metric system of measurements in Australia

- Date: 1966–1988
- Duration: 22 years
- Location: Australia
- Type: Metrification

Metrication in Australia effectively began in 1966 with the conversion to decimal currency under the auspices of the Decimal Currency Board. The conversion of measurements – metrication – started in 1971 under the direction of the Metric Conversion Board, and actively proceeded until the board was disbanded in 1981.

Before 1970, Australia mostly used imperial units of measurement, as a legacy of its colonial history under the United Kingdom. Between 1970 and 1988, imperial units were withdrawn from general legal use and replaced with the International System of Units (SI), a process facilitated by legislation and government agencies. SI units are now the only legal units of measurement in Australia. Australia's largely successful transition to the metric system parallels that of metrication in New Zealand but contrasts with metrication in the United States, metrication in the United Kingdom, and metrication in Canada, which was only partial.

== History ==
Although there was debate in Australia's first parliament after federation to consider adopting the metric system, metric units first became legal for use in Australia in 1947 when Australia signed the Metre Convention (Convention du Mètre). However, imperial weights and measures were most commonly used until the federal government began the metric changeover in the 1970s. SI units were subsequently adopted as the basis for Australia's measurement standards, thereby becoming Australia's legal units of measurement.

In 1968, a select committee of the Australian senate chaired by Keith Laught examined metric weights and measures and came to the unanimous conclusion that it was both practical and desirable for Australia to change to the metric system. Some of their considerations included the "inherent advantages of the metric system" that meant that weighing and measuring was facilitated, "often with substantial increases in efficiency". Educationally, the reform would "simplify and unify the teaching of mathematics and science, reduce errors, save teaching time and give a better understanding of basic physical principles". In 1968, more than 75% of Australia's exports went to metric countries and at that time it was noted that all countries (except the United States) were using metric units or were converting to the metric system. It was also noted that, because of Australia's large migrant program, more than 10 percent of people aged 16 or older had used the metric system before coming to Australia. They also noted that school pupils were widely familiar with the metric system because it had been taught in the schools for many years.

By 1968, metrication was already well underway in Australian industry. The pharmaceutical industry had metricated in 1965, and much of the chemical and electronics industries worked in metric units; there were no imperial units for the latter. One of the country's major automobile manufacturers had already declared its intention to metricate before the government announced its decision to change to the metric system. "The change itself provided a unique opportunity to rationalise and modernise industrial practices and bring Australia's technical standard specifications into accord with those adopted internationally".

On 12 June 1970, the Australian Metric Conversion Act passed by the Australian Parliament received royal assent. This Act created the Metric Conversion Board to facilitate the conversion of measurements from imperial to metric. A timeline of major developments in this conversion process is as follows:

- 1971 – The Australian wool industry converted to the metric system.
- 1972 – Horse racing converted in August and air temperatures were converted in September.
- 1973 – All primary schools were teaching the metric system alone: many had been teaching both imperial and metric for some years. All secondary schools were now using the metric system.
- 1974 – Large scale conversion across industries, including packaged grains, dairy products, eggs, building, timber, paper, printing, meteorological services, postal services, communications, road transport, travel, textiles, gas, electricity, surveying, sport, water supply, mining, metallurgy, chemicals, petroleum, and automotive services. Most beverages, aside from spirits, were also converted to metric units by the end of the year. The conversion of road signs took place in July, aided by a publicity campaign to prepare the public.
- 1976 – The building and construction industry completed its change to metric measurements (within two years) by January.
- 1977 – All packaged goods were labelled in metric units, and the air transport, food, energy, machine tool, electronic, electrical engineering, and appliance manufacturing industries converted to metric.
- 1987 – The property industry, the last major industry holdout, converted to metric.
- 1988 – With Western Australia fully implementing the change, metrication was completed nationwide, and the metric system became the only system of legal measurements in Australia.

=== Metric Conversion Board ===
Opposition to metrication was not widespread. The Metric Conversion Board did not proceed with education programs as polling revealed that most people were learning units and their applications independently of each other, rendering efforts to teach the systematic nature of the metric system unnecessary and possibly increasing opposition. The board was dissolved in 1981, but the conversion to the metric system was not completed until 1988. During its 11 years of operation, the board spent A$5.955 million, equivalent to A$26.276 million in 2022, and the federal government distributed A$10 million, equivalent to A$48.5 million in 2022, to the states to support their conversion process. Between 1984 and 1988, the conversion was the responsibility of the National Standards Commission, later renamed the National Measurement Institute in 1988. The cost of metrication for the private sector was not determined, but the Prices Justification Tribunal reported that metrication was not used to justify price increases.

=== Metrication of horse racing ===
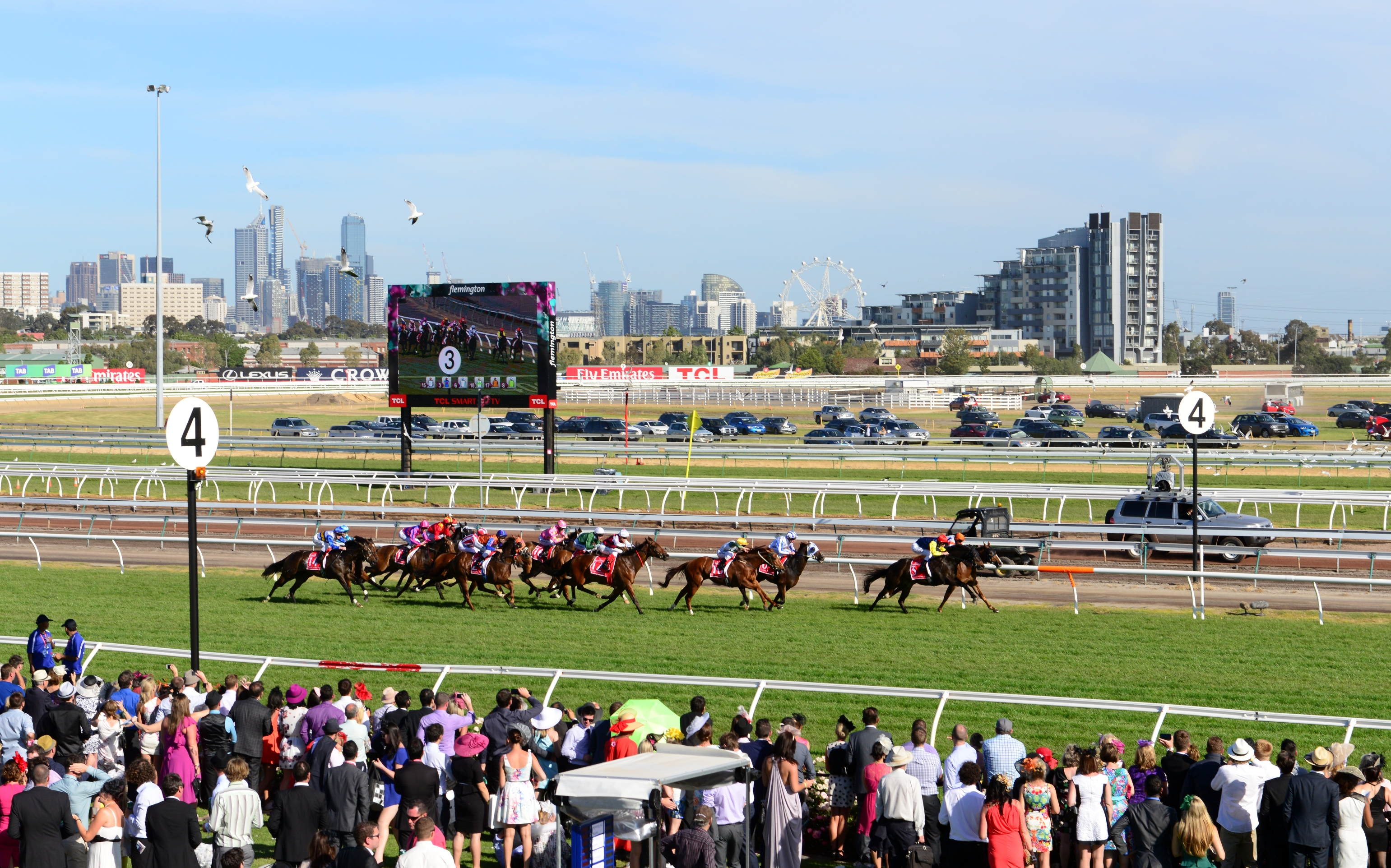
The first metric Melbourne Cup was raced in November 1972

An early change was the metrication of horse racing. This was facilitated because the furlong (201.2 metres or 660 feet) is close to 200 metres (656 ft). Therefore, the Melbourne Cup distance was changed from 10,560 feet (3,219 m) to 3,200 metres (10,499 ft), a reduction of about 0.6%. The first metric Melbourne Cup was run in November 1972.

=== Metrication of weather reporting and forecasts ===
When the Australian Bureau of Meteorology was enlisted to introduce the metric system for weather reporting and forecasts, its public relations officer, Godfrey Wiseman, coined a series of jingles to educate the public, using the terms frosty fives, tingling tens, temperate twenties, thirsty thirties and fiery forties to describe human sensation to temperatures in degrees Celsius. This was very successful because the public soon became aware of the significance of the descriptions.

At the culmination of this campaign, weather reports and forecasts in both Fahrenheit and Celsius were provided for only one month. After that, from 1 September 1972, only Celsius measurements were given for temperature.

Similarly, wind speed was reported only in kilometres per hour (km/h) from 1 April 1973, and rainfall was reported in millimetres – with river depths, snow depths and waves reported in metres – from 1 January 1974.

=== Metrication of the road signs ===
Speed limits signs in km/h had the number indicating the speed limit inside a red circle

An important and very visible sign of metric conversion in Australia was the change in road signs and the accompanying traffic regulations; "M-day" for this change was 1 July 1974. Because of careful planning, almost every road sign in Australia was converted within a month. This was achieved by installing covered metric signs alongside the imperial signs before the change, and then removing the imperial signs and uncovering the metric signs during the month of conversion.

While road signs could not all be changed at the same time, there was little chance of confusion as to what any speed limit sign meant during this short change-over period. This was because the previous mph signs had black-on-white rectangular signage, in the same style as current United States speed limit signs, while the km/h signs that replaced them had the speed limit number inside a red circle, as is done in Europe.

Road distance signs were also converted during this period. To avoid confusion as to whether the distance indicated was in miles or kilometres, new major distance signs had affixed to them a temporary yellow plate showing the symbol km. On the many new kilometre signs on minor roads, a yellow plate which showed the corresponding number of miles was affixed under the now permanent kilometre distance indication. These temporary plates were removed after about one year.

Except for bridge clearance and flood-depth signs, dual marking was avoided. Though people opposed to metrication expressed concern that ignorance of the meaning of metric speeds would lead to accidents on the roads; this did not happen, as most drivers under the age of 25 had been taught metric units at school, and through them, their parents were familiar with metric speeds, if not metric units as a whole.

It was believed that public education would be the most effective way of ensuring public safety. A Panel for Publicity on Road Travel, comprising various motoring organisations, regulatory authorities, and the media, planned a campaign to publicise the change. The resulting publicity campaign cost A$200,000, and the Australian Government Department of Transport paid for it. The board also produced 2.5 million copies of a pamphlet, "Motoring Goes Metric". This was distributed through post offices, police stations, and motor registry offices.

Kevin Wilks wrote:

For about a year before the change, motor car manufacturers fitted dual speedometers to their vehicles and, after 1974, all new cars were fitted with metric-only speedometers. Several kinds of speedometer conversion kits were available.

As a result of all these changes, conversion on the roads occurred without incident.

— Kevin Wilks

=== Building and construction ===
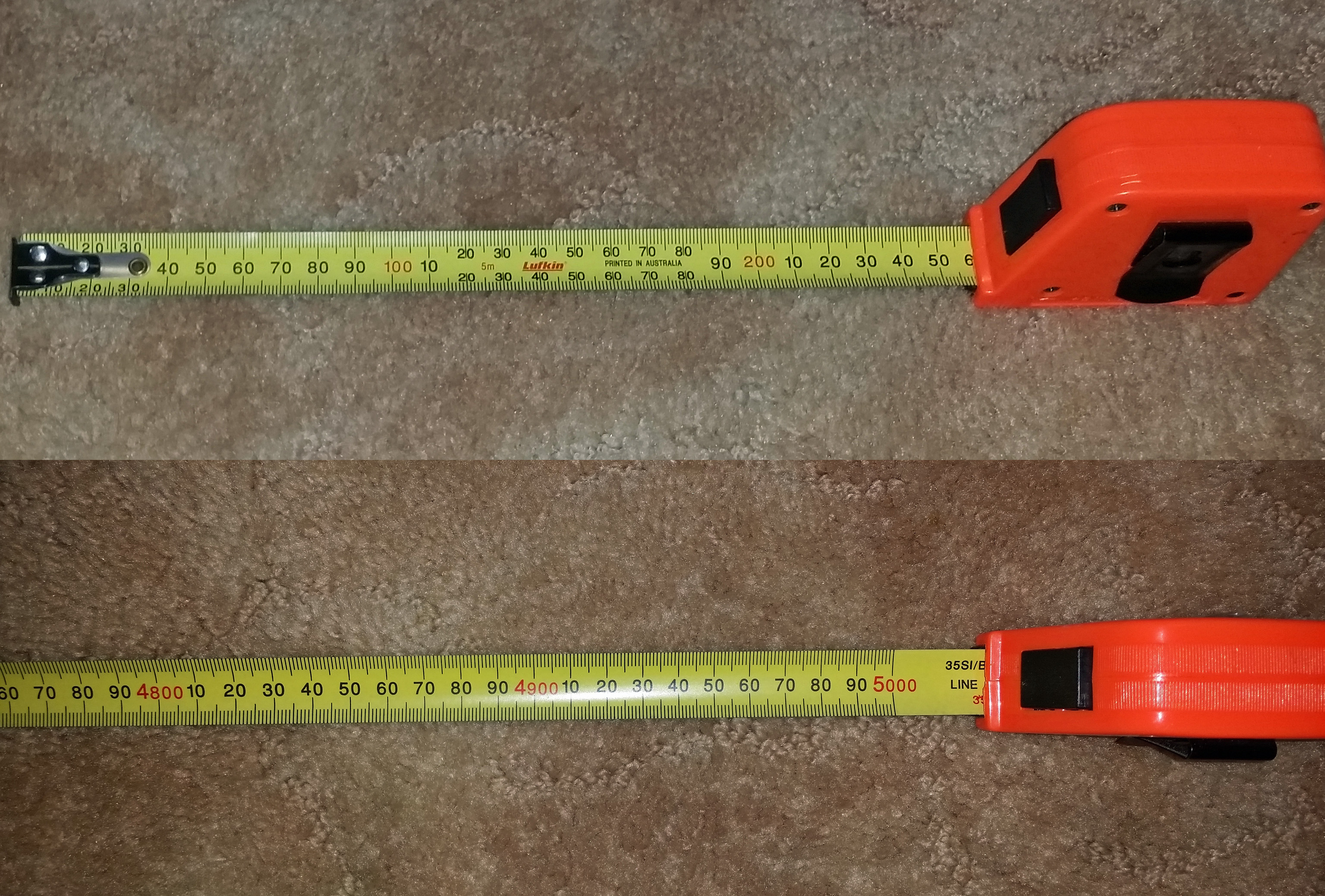
A measuring tape showing millimetres

The building industry was the first major industry group in Australia to complete its transition to the metric system. This was achieved within two years by January 1976 for all new buildings other than those for which design had commenced well before metrication began. The resulting savings for builders and their subcontractors have been estimated at 10% of gross turnover.

In this, the industry was grateful to Standards Australia for the early publication of the standard AS 1155–1974, "Metric Units for Use in the Construction Industry", which specified the use of millimetres as the small unit for the metrication upgrade. In adopting the millimetre as the "small" unit of length for metrication (instead of the centimetre), the Metric Conversion Board relied heavily on experience in the United Kingdom and with the International Organisation for Standardisation, where this decision had already been made.

This was formally stated as follows:

The metric units for linear measurement in building and construction will be the metre (m) and the millimetre (mm), with the kilometre (km) being used where required. This will apply to all sectors of the industry, and the centimetre (cm) shall not be used. [...] The centimetre should not be used in any calculation and it should never be written down [...].

The logic of using the millimetre in this context was that the metric system was designed so that there would be a multiple or submultiple for every use. Decimal fractions would not have to be used. Since the tolerances on building components and building practice would rarely be less than one millimetre (0.039 in), the millimetre became the subunit most appropriate to this industry.

Electrical wiring was converted from imperial measurements such as 1/044, 1/064, 3/036, 7/029 or 7/036 to metric 1.5 mm^{2} (0.0023 sq in), 2.5 mm^{2} (0.0039 sq in) or 4.0 mm^{2} (0.0062 sq in) wire sizes.

== Exceptions ==
Metrication is complete, with some exceptions:

- Road signs solely use metric measurements, as do the speedometers and odometers in motor vehicles produced after 1974. However, there was no requirement for pre-1974 vehicles to have their speedometers and odometers converted to metric, so vintage cars display miles and miles per hour, and privately imported vehicles, such as classic cars, are not required to be converted.
- Vehicle tyres (as in the rest of the world) mark the rim diameter in inches and the width in millimetres, such that a tyre marked '165/70R13' has a width of 165 millimetres (6.5 in), an aspect ratio (profile) of 70% and a 13-inch (330 mm) rim diameter. Tyre pressures may be given in either kilopascals (kPa) or pounds per square inch (PSI).
- In some cases, old imperial standards were replaced with rounded metric values, as with horse racing or the size of beer glasses (rounded to the nearest 5 cm^{3} or 0.31 cu in). The pre-metric names of beer glass sizes, including the pint, have been retained (although in South Australia the "pint" of beer is not an imperial pint, as it is elsewhere in Australia).
- Dressed timber is often sold in lengths such as 1.8, 2.4, 3.0, and 3.6 metres (5 ft 11 in, 7 ft 10 in, 9 ft 10 in, and 11 ft 10 in), each multiples of 300 millimetres (12 in), approximating foot-length increments, while pipes and conduits may be specified as having diameters of 12, 19, 25, and 32 millimetres (0.47, 0.75, 0.98, and 1.26 in) (based on "soft" conversions of 0.5, 0.75, 1, and 1.25 inches or 13, 19, 25, and 32 millimetres).
- In some cases, goods manufactured to pre-metric standards are available, such as some bolts, nuts, screws, and pipe threads.
- Body weight is referred to in kilograms, and baby nappy sizes are specified in grams only. A few parents still convert their baby's hospital-stated birth mass to pounds and ounces.
- Human height is measured in centimetres. In informal contexts, a person's height may be stated in feet and inches.{{efn |At least one Australian internet dating service uses metric units for height with the imperial measurement alongside.
- Domestic and commercial property is advertised in square metres or hectares. Although crop yields are described in tonnes per hectare, rural land area is occasionally reported in acres.
- Weather reports are measured in metric units but occasionally refer to some wave heights in feet.
- Digital typography is measured often in the desktop publishing point (DTP point, PostScript point, colloquially just point, abbreviated to pt), defined as 1/72 or 0.0138̅ of an inch (0.352778 mm), and the CSS pixel (colloquially just pixel, abbreviated to px), defined as 1/96 of a CSS inch (0.264583 mm) for printers and high-resolution displays and a physical screen pixel for low-resolution displays.

Whilst imperial units may sometimes be specified instead of SI units (usually, where the product originates from or is intended for an American market), the use of any measurement except in SI units is not "legal for trade" under Australian legislation.

Further examples where non-metric units are (sometimes) specified are:

- Aviation, as in many other metric countries, specifies horizontal distances in nautical miles and horizontal speed in knots, but horizontal distance for visibility or clearance from clouds is in kilometres or metres, as are runway dimensions. The pressure and temperature are also given in SI units, in hectopascals and degrees Celsius, respectively. Altitude and ascent/descent are given in feet and feet per minute.
- Altitude for skydiving is routinely given in feet, which follows from the above existing aviation conventions. Scuba diving uses metric units.
- Australia uses metric paper sizes for office use and home printing (most commonly A4 size, being 210 mm × 297 mm or 8.3 in × 11.7 in) However, the term dots per inch (dpi) is still used when referring to printing resolution. The photo printing industry uses both imperial and metric sizes for photograph dimensions (e.g. 4 in × 6 in or 10.2 cm × 15.2 cm as well as 10 cm × 15 cm or 3.9 in × 5.9 in).
- Historical writing and presentations may include pre-metric units to reflect the context of the era represented.
- Display sizes for the screens of TVs and computer monitors may be described as having their diagonals measured in inches instead of or as well as centimetres, e.g., a screen may be advertised as 42" (107 cm).
- Firearm barrel length is almost always referred to in inches and ammunition weights are measured in grains.

Cultural influence from the UK and the US has also been cited as a reason for the residual use of imperial units.

== See also ==
- Outline of the metric system

== Sources ==
- Naughtin, Pat (15 May 2001). "[USMA:12782] Re: [ukma] Demand metric road signs!". The Mail Archive.
- Wilks, Kevin Joseph (1992). Metrication in Australia: a Review of the Effectiveness of Policies and Procedures in Australia's Conversion to the Metric System (PDF). Canberra: Department of Industry, Technology and Commerce, Australian Government Publishing Service. ISBN 0-644-24860-2.
