= Highway Traffic Act =

Legislation in Ontario, Canada

Legislative Assembly of Ontario
- Citation: R.S.O. 1990, C. H.8
- Territorial extent: Ontario, province-wide

Related legislation
- Provincial Offences Act

Keywords
- driving
- Status: In force

The Highway Traffic Act (French: Code de la route, HTA; "the Act") is a statute in Ontario, Canada regulating the licensing of vehicles, classification of traffic offences, administration of loads, classification of vehicles and other transport-related issues. First introduced in 1923 to deal with increasing accidents during the early years of motoring in Ontario, and replacing earlier legislation such as the Highway Travel Act, there have been amendments due to changes to driving conditions and new transportation trends. For example, in 2009, the Act was revised to ban the use of cell phones while driving.

Offences under the Highway Traffic Act are the most commonly tried in Provincial Offences court. Over 1.3 million offences are tried each year under the Act, with the most common charges being speeding (559,013 occurrences, s. 128 - Speeding), running a red light (127,836 occurrences, s. 144 - Red light - proceed before green), driving whilst disqualified (117,470 counts, s. 7 - Drive motor vehicle, no currently validated permit), fail to stop (51,263 counts, s. 136 - Disobey stop sign - fail to stop) and telephoning whilst driving (51,210 counts, s. 78.1 - Drive - hand-held communication device).

== Sections ==
Section 1 of the Act covers definitions and application of the Act to places other than highways. The definition of "highway" in the Act is broad in nature to include "a common and public highway, street, avenue, parkway, driveway, square, place, bridge, viaduct or trestle, any part of which is intended for or used by the general public for the passage of vehicles and includes the area between the lateral property lines thereof".

=== Part I: Administration ===
Part I covers the following items in sections 2 to 5 of the Act:

- Powers and duties of the Ministry of Transportation
- Registrar of Motor Vehicles
- Deputy Registrar
- Forms
- Power to do things electronically
- Regulations re fees
- Administrative monetary penalties
- Cancellation of permit, license where false information is provided
- Cancellation of the permit, license where information on permit, the license is incorrect
- Protection from personal liability
- Requirements for applicant

=== Part II: Permits ===
Part II covers the following items in sections 6 to 23 of the Act:

- Permit requirements
- International Registration Plan
- Record-keeping by IRP permit holders
- Examination and inspection
- Sharing examination, inspection findings with other IRP jurisdictions
- IRP inspector's costs
- Assessment and reassessment of fees, etc.
- Interest
- Objections
- Appeal or review from Minister's decision
- False statements on IRP documents
- Permit refusal or cancellation
- Collection and disclosure of information
- Assignment to another minister
- Disclosure to Minister of Finance re taxing statutes
- Regulations
- Fees
- Permit limitations
- False statement, change of name or address, obliterated vehicle no., etc.
- Manufacturer's vehicle information number to be affixed
- Where the transfer of ownership or end of lease
- Used vehicle information package
- Violations as to number plates
- Number plates, further violations
- Improper or invalid number plates and cab cards
- Exceptions as to residents of other provinces, permit requirements, etc.
- Commercial motor vehicles
- CVOR certificates issued, renewed by Registrar
- Revocation of CVOR certificate for dishonoured payments
- Refusal to issue, replace or new CVOR certificates
- Safety ratings, commercial motor vehicle operators
- Person deemed to be operator
- Commercial motor vehicles, enforcement of ss. 16-23, etc.
- Offences, commercial motor vehicles
- Regulations and fees, commercial motor vehicles
- Liability insurance for commercial motor vehicles
- Insurance

=== Part III: Parking Permits ===
Part III covers the following items in sections 26 to 30 of the Act:

- Accessible parking permits
- Offence, accessible parking permit
- Inspection, accessible parking permit
- Regulations, accessible parking permits

==== Part III.1: Electric vehicle charging stations ====
Part III.1 covers the following items in section 30.4 of the Act, with regard to charging stations:

- Definitions
- Improper use
- Penalty
- Regulations

=== Part IV: Licences ===
Part IV covers the following items in sections 31 to 58 of the Act:

- Driving a privilege
- Driver's licence
- Combined photo card in lieu of driver's licence card
- Photo-comparison technology
- As to carrying licences and surrender on demand
- Exemption as to non-residents, licensing requirements
- Displaying licence that has been suspended, altered, etc.
- Driving prohibited while licence suspended
- Drivers under 16 prohibited
- Minimum age to drive motor-assisted, power-assisted bicycle
- Prohibition as to letting or hiring
- Picking up passengers for compensation prohibited without a licence, etc.
- Agreements with other jurisdictions
- Suspension on conviction for certain offences
- Suspension on: reinstatement, reduction, an extension of conviction
- Reinstatement conditions, ignition interlock devices
- Ignition interlock devices, further provisions
- Administrative vehicle impoundment for contravening ignition interlock condition
- Suspension for driving while disqualified
- Suspension while prohibited from driving
- Increased suspension time
- Condition on the licence that blood alcohol concentration level be zero
- When driver may be disqualified
- Defaulted fine
- Suspension and cancellation of licence, etc., general
- Notice, proposed action s. 47 or safety concern
- Administrative licence suspension for blood alcohol concentration above .05
- Short-term administrative licence suspension for drug or drug and alcohol impairment
- Breath testing, novice drivers
- Breath testing, driver accompanying novice
- Breath testing, young drivers
- Administrative suspension of licence for blood alcohol concentration above .08, failing or refusing to provide a breath sample
- Long-term administrative licence suspension for drug or drug and alcohol impairment
- Administrative vehicle impoundment for drug or drug and alcohol impairment, blood alcohol concentration above .08, failing to provide a sample or submit to tests
- Proceedings before Tribunal
- Appeal
- Appeal of ninety-day suspension
- Appeal of long-term vehicle impoundment for driving while suspended
- Appeal of impoundment, commercial motor vehicles
- Penalty for driving motor vehicle when permit suspended or cancelled
- Service of notice of licence suspension
- Driving while driver's licence suspended
- Where person whose permit or licence suspended does not hold permit or licence
- Suspension on appeal
- Long-term vehicle impoundment for driving while suspended
- Short-term vehicle impoundment for driving while suspended
- Demerit point system
- Conduct review programs
- Regulations, novice drivers
- Police request for novice driver's passenger's identification
- Offence, novice driver regulations
- Driving instructors
- Driving schools
- Inspectors

=== Part V: Garage and Storage Licences ===
Part V covers the following items in sections 59 to 60:

- Licence respecting dealing in motor vehicles, etc.
- Second-hand vehicles, offences

=== Part VI: Equipment ===
Part VI covers the following items in sections 61 to 107 of the Act:

- Lamps
- Vehicles with right-hand drive
- Brakes
- Hydraulic brake and system fluid
- Other equipment
- Extended mirrors
- Speedometers required in buses
- Speed-limiting systems
- Tires and wheels
- Regulations and offences, tires
- Rebuilt tires
- Safety glass
- Equipment obstructing the view
- Windows to afford clear view
- Noise, smoke, bells and horns
- Slow-moving vehicle sign
- Sleigh bells
- Display screen visible to driver prohibited
- Hand-held devices prohibited
- Speed measuring warning devices
- Pre-empting traffic control signal devices prohibited
- Attachments required when vehicle drew on highway
- Regulations re bumpers
- Inspections, unsafe vehicles
- Inspections, unsafe commercial motor vehicles
- Regulations re inspection of certain motor vehicles
- Penalty for driving an unsafe vehicle
- Offence if wheel detaches from commercial motor vehicle
- Offence if parts, etc., detach
- Offence of causing parts to detach
- Prohibition where evidence of inspection required
- Certificates and stickers provided by Ministry
- Regulations re inspection of vehicles
- Director
- Safety standards certificate and vehicle inspection sticker
- Motor vehicle inspection station licence
- Motor vehicle inspection mechanic
- Revocation of registration of motor vehicle inspection mechanic
- Hearing re terms of the licence
- Proposal to refuse to issue or revoke licence or registration
- Tribunal hearings, general
- Service of notice
- Inspectors
- Offences
- Regulations, safety standards certificates, motor vehicle inspection stations, etc.
- Regulations, accessories and ornaments
- Regulations, safety devices
- Commercial motor vehicles, further provisions
- Power-assisted bicycles
- Motorcycle and bicycle helmets
- Horse-riders, helmets and footwear
- Sale of new vehicles
- Seat belts
- Inspection and maintenance of commercial motor vehicles

=== Part VII: Load and Dimensions ===
Part VII covers the following items in sections 108 to 113 of the Act:

- Vehicle dimensions
- Permits to exceed dimension and weight limits (use of highway)
- Special permits to exceed dimension and weight limits
- Carrying and production of a special permit
- Suspension, etc., of a special permit
- Additional power of Registrar to suspend, etc., special permits
- Loading vehicles
- Regulations, carriage of explosives, etc.
- Farm vehicles

=== Part VIII: Weight ===
Part VIII covers the following items in sections 114 to 127 of the Act:

- Restrictions as to weight on tires
- Maximum allowable axle unit weights
- Maximum allowable axle group weights
- Maximum allowable gross vehicle weights
- Raw forest products allowance during freeze-up
- Prohibition re operation on Class B Highway
- Operating within permitted weight
- Reduced load periods
- Weight on bridges
- Power of officer to have vehicle weighed, examined
- Offence and penalty
- Overloading by consignor
- Regulations, weight standards

=== Part IX: Rate of Speed ===
Part IX covers the following items in sections 128 to 132 of the Act:

- Rate of speed
- Conversion of the rate of speed set out in by-laws
- Careless driving
- Territory without municipal organization
- Unnecessary slow driving prohibited

=== Part X: Rules of the Road ===
Part X covers the following items in sections 133 to 191 of the Act:

- Direction of traffic by a police officer
- Removal of vehicle, debris blocking traffic
- Right of way at uncontrolled intersections
- Stop at through highway
- Stop signs, erection at intersections
- Yield right-of-way signs
- Right of way on entering highway from private road
- Pedestrian crossover
- Turning at intersections
- Signalling turns and stops
- Requirement to yield to bus from bus bay
- U-turns prohibited
- Traffic control signals and pedestrian control signals
- Blocking intersection
- Portable signal lights
- Traffic control stop and slow signs
- Slow vehicles to travel on right side
- Overtaking and passing rules
- Driving to left of centre prohibited under certain conditions
- Passing to right of the vehicle
- Highways designated for use of paved shoulder
- Meaning of "designated", ss. 141, 153 and 154
- Highway designated for one-way traffic
- Where highway divided into lanes
- Regulations for high occupancy vehicle lanes
- Restricted use of border approach lanes
- Times designation applicable
- Moving from roadway to roadway on divided highways
- Backing prohibited, speed limit over 80 km/h
- Headway
- Approaching, following emergency vehicles
- Towing of persons on bicycles, toboggans, etc., prohibited
- Only one vehicle to be drawn on highway
- Crowding driver's seat
- Vehicles required to stop at railway crossing signal
- Driving of vehicles under crossing gates prohibited
- Opening of doors of motor vehicles
- Passing streetcars
- Approaching ridden or driven horses, etc.
- Use of passing beam
- Alternating beams
- Parking on roadway
- Tow truck services
- Racing, stunts, etc., prohibited
- Nitrous oxide fuel systems prohibited
- Horse racing on a highway
- Railway crossings
- School buses
- School crossings
- Soliciting rides or business from drivers
- Clinging to vehicles, bicycle passengers, etc.
- Duties of a pedestrian when walking along a highway
- Littering highway prohibited
- Deposit of snow on the roadway
- Regulations, signs and markings
- Regulations, tunnels
- Defacing or removing notices or obstructions
- Regulating or prohibiting the use of highways by pedestrians, etc.
- Prohibiting commercial vehicles in the left lane
- Aircraft on highways
- Riding in the house or boat trailers prohibited
- Air cushioned vehicles prohibited on highways
- Commercial motor vehicles, driving rules
- Exemption certificate, hours of work for commercial motor vehicle drivers
- Contracts of carriage

==== Part X.1: Toll Highways ====
Part X.1 covers the following items in section 191 of the Act:

- Toll device required
- Evasion, etc., of the electronic toll system
- Regulations, toll devices

==== Part X.2: Medical Transportation Services ====
Part X.2 covers the following items in section 191 of the Act:

- Medical transportation services
- Regulations, medical transportation services

==== Part X.3: Off-Road Vehicles ====
Part X.3 covers the following item in section 191 of the Act:

- Off-road vehicles on highways regulated by regulations, by-laws

=== Part XI: Civil Proceedings ===
Part XI covers the following items in sections 191 to 193 of the Act:

- Liability for loss or damage
- Onus of disproving negligence

=== Part XII: Municipal By-Laws ===
Part XII covers the following item in section 195 of the Act:

- Effect of by-laws7(1)(b)

==== Part XII.1: Bicycle Lanes ====
Part XII.1 covers the following items in section 195 and Schedule of the Act:

- Minister approval for bicycle lanes required
- Review of bicycles
- Direction to restore
- Existing lanes in the City of Toronto, direction to restore
- Removal of lanes
- Municipality required to provide support or information
- Reimbursement
- No cause of action against Crown, etc.
- Proceedings barred, independent contractors
- Protection from liability, independent contractors
- Protection from liability, municipalities
- No reimbursement, compensation or damages
- No expropriation or injurious affection

=== Part XIII: Suspension for Failure to Pay Judgements or Meet Support Obligations ===
Part XIII covers the following items in sections 196 to 198 of the Act:

- Licence suspended for failure to pay a judgement
- Licence suspension on the direction of Director of Family Responsibility Office
- Personal information
- Protection from personal liability

=== Part XIV: Records and Reporting of Accidents and Convictions ===
Part XIV covers the following items in sections 199 to 205 of the Act:

- Duty to report an accident
- Irreparable vehicles, etc.
- Duty of person in charge of a vehicle in case of an accident
- Notification of damage to trees, fences, etc.
- Reporting by various officials
- Report of a medical practitioner
- Report of an optometrist
- Duties of Registrar
- Collection and disclosure of information

==== Part XIV.2: Red Light Camera System Evidence ====
Part XIV.2 covers the following items in section 205 of the Act:

- Red light camera system evidence
- Application, proceedings commenced by filing a certificate of offence
- Provincial Offences Act, Part I
- Evidence of ownership
- Challenge to officer's evidence
- Certificate evidence
- Limitations on penalty
- Regulations, red light camera system evidence

==== Part XIV.3: School Bus Camera System ====
Part XIV.3 covers the following items in section 206 of the Act:

- Use of automated school bus camera system

==== Part XIV.4: Automated Street Car System ====
Part XIV.4 covers the following items in section 206 of the Act:

- Use of automated street car enforcement system authorized
- Regulations

==== Part XIV.5: Automated Camera Enforcement For Road Safety ====
Part XIV.5 covers the following items in section 206 of the Act:

- Information and data
- Regulations
- Restrictions re payment of camera suppliers or vendors
- Extinguishment of certain causes of action re repeal of Part XIV.1

=== Part XV: Procedure, Arrests and Penalties ===
Part XV covers the following items in sections 207 to 227 of the Act:

- Vehicle owner may be convicted
- Recovery
- Right to damages reserved
- Notice of conviction to Registrar
- Out-of-province evidence re vehicle ownership
- Return of suspended licences to Registrar
- Police officer may secure possession of a suspended licence
- When owner may appear before a justice of the peace
- General penalty
- Community safety zones
- Power of police officer to stop the vehicle
- Power of officer to examine commercial vehicles
- Arrest powers
- Cyclist to identify self
- Suspension of licence upon conviction
- Impounding motor vehicles
- Abandoned or unplated vehicles
- Impounding of the vehicle on appeal
- Appointment of officers for carrying out provisions of Act
- Service on the driver of commercial motor vehicle sufficient
- Inspection of records
- Where proceeding for the offence may be heard, commercial motor vehicles on a journey

=== Part XVI: Pilot Projects ===
Part XVI covers the following items in section 228 and Schedule of the Act:

- Pilot projects
- Certificate of justice

== See also ==
- Revised Statutes of Ontario
