= Road speed limit enforcement in Australia =

Overview of road speed limit enforcement methods applied in Australia

Road speed limit enforcement in Australia constitutes the actions taken by the authorities to force road users to comply with the Speed limits in Australia. Speed limit enforcement equipment such as speed cameras and other technologies such as radar and LIDAR are widely used by the authorities. In some regions, aircraft equipped with VASCAR devices are also used.

Each of the Australian states have their own speed limit enforcement policies and strategies and approved enforcement devices.

== Methods ==
=== Mobile Gatso speed camera ===
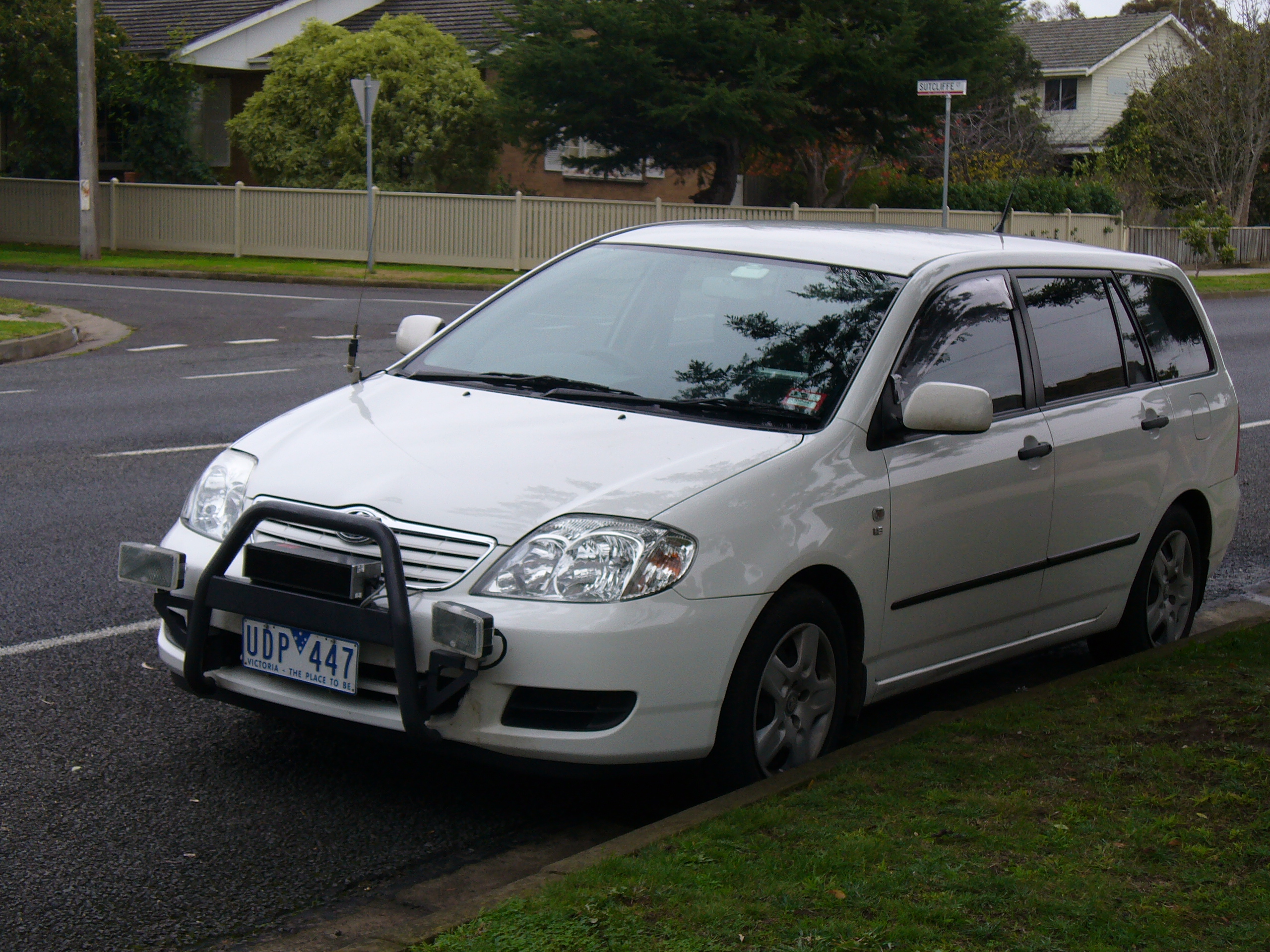
Gatso Mobile Speed Camera, used in Victoria

This mobile speed camera is used in Victoria and Queensland and can be operated in various ways. Without a flash, the only evidence of a speed camera on the outside of the car is a black rectangular box, which sends out a radar beam, about 30 cm by 10 cm, mounted on the front of the vehicle. On the older models of the camera, and on rainy days or in bad light, a cable is used to link it to a box with a flash placed just in front of the vehicle. The operator sits in the car and takes the pictures, which are then uploaded to a laptop computer. In both states unmarked cars are used. In Victoria these cameras are operated by Serco contractors, while in Queensland uniformed police officers operate them.

Many of the modern Gatso cameras now feature full capability, flashless operation. The advent of infra-red flash technology has provided Gatsos with the capacity to capture vehicles exceeding the limit in varying conditions - without emitting a bright flash, which in many cases can be considered distracting to the driver, especially if taken head-on. Infra-red light is invisible to the human eye, but when paired with a camera with an infra-red sensor, can be used as a flash to produce a clear image in low light conditions.

=== Mobile Multanova speed camera ===
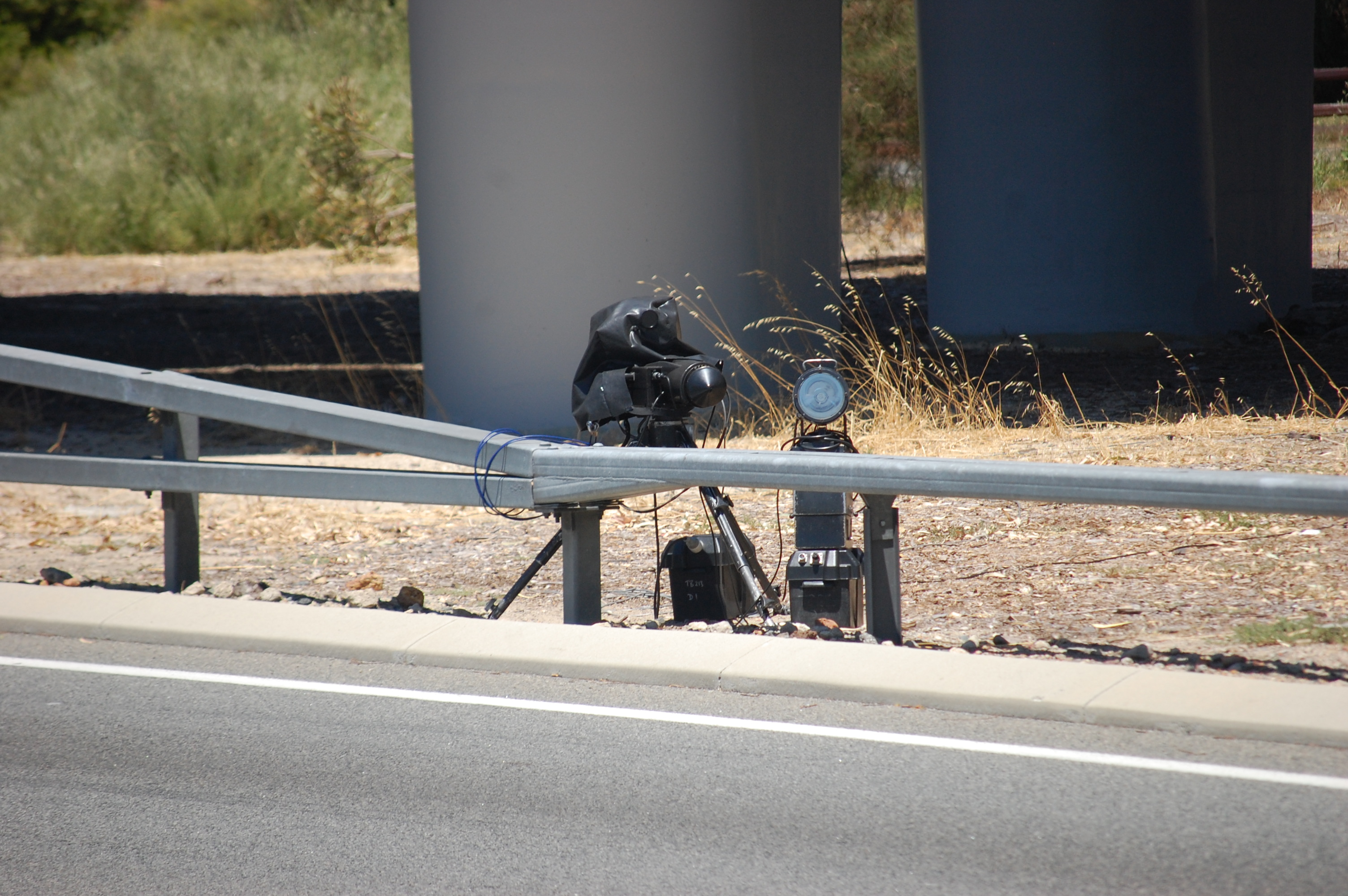
Multanova Speed Camera in the median strip of the eastbound lanes on the Graham Farmer Freeway prior to the northbridge tunnel entrance in Perth, Western Australia

Used only in Western Australia, this Doppler RADAR-based camera is mounted usually on a tripod on the side of the road. It is sometimes covered by a black sheet and there is usually a "anywhere anytime" sign following it chained onto a pole or tree. It is sometimes incorrectly referred to as a "Multinova". Multanovas are manufactured by a Swiss company of the same name - Western Australia utilises the 6F and the 9F models.

During the daytime, the Multanova unit uses a standard "white" flash, but in low light or night time, a red filter is added to the flash so as to not dazzle the driver.

The camera is always accompanied by a white station wagon or by a black or, more commonly a white, silver or brown Nissan X-Trail, staffed by an un-sworn police officer (not a contractor) who is responsible for assembling and disassembling the unit, supervising it and operating the accompanying laptop in the car for the few hours that it is deployed at a location. The Nissan X-Trail usually has a bull bar and spotlights on it and a large, thick antenna. The camera stays usually for about four to five hours. There were 25 in use in Perth at the beginning of 2008.

As of late 2011 Multanova use in WA has been discontinued in favour of LIDAR exclusively.

=== Fixed speed-only camera ===
Speed camera with infrared flash on Princes Freeway West, Geelong

A variable speed limit fixed camera on the West Gate Bridge, Melbourne

These cameras come in many forms, some free standing on poles; others mounted on bridges or overhead gantries. The cameras may consist of a box for taking photographs, as well as a smaller box for the flash, or only a single box containing all the instruments. Recently introduced infrared cameras, do not emit a blinding flash and can therefore be used to take front-on photographs showing the driver's face.

Most states are now starting to replace older analogue film fixed cameras with modern digital variants.

Fixed speed cameras can use Doppler RADAR or Piezo strips embedded in the road to measure a vehicle's speed as it passes the camera.

However ANPR technology is also used to time vehicles between two or more fixed cameras that are a known distance apart (typically at least several kilometres). The average speed is then calculated using the formula: $speed = {distance \over time}$. The longer distance over which the speed is measured prevents drivers from slowing down momentarily for a camera before speeding up again. The SAFE-T-CAM system uses this technology, but was designed to only targets heavy vehicles. Newer ANPR cameras in Victoria are able to target any vehicle.

=== Fixed dual speed and red light camera ===
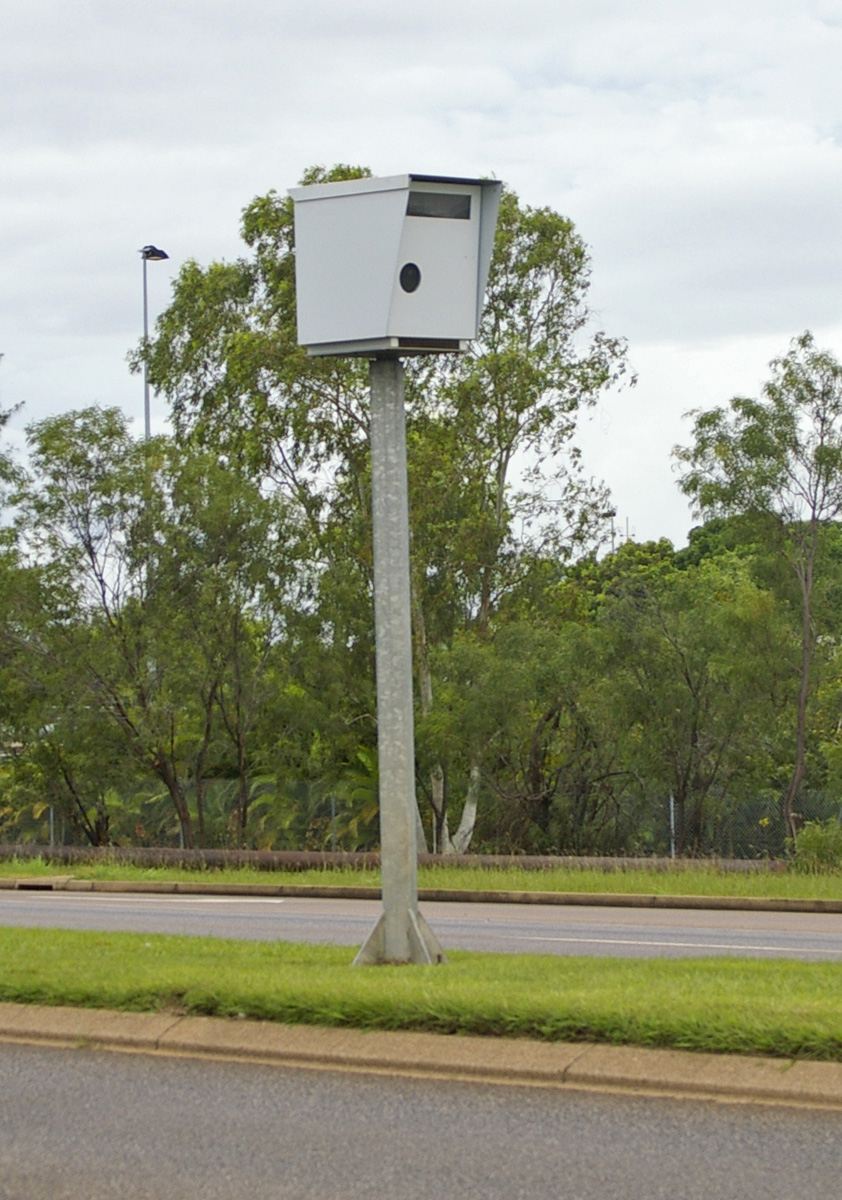
Dual speed/red light camera in Darwin, Northern Territory

These cameras are used in the Northern Territory, South Australia, the Australian Capital Territory, Victoria, New South Wales and Western Australia. They detect speeding at the intersection as well as running a red light. They look the same as red light cameras, except they are digital and look slightly more modern. Some of the Victorian cameras are Traffipax brand.

In New South Wales and South Australia dual redlight/speed cameras are identified by a "Safety Camera" sign.

Queensland is in the process of investigating conversion to dual redlight/speed cameras as the current system is reaching end-of-life.

=== Other speed checking devices ===
Police also use other technology that does not rely photographs being taken of an offence, typically where officers enforce the speed limit in person.

==== 'Silver Eagle' ====
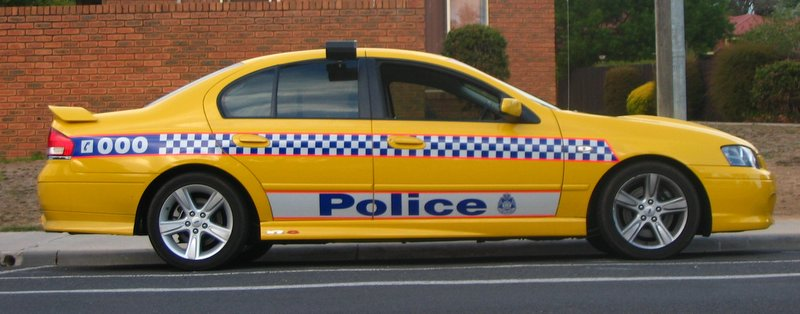
Victoria Police vehicle with 'Silver Eagle' device mounted behind the driver

New South Wales police used the Silver Eagle vehicle-mounted unit. This radar device is typically mounted on the right hand side of the vehicle just behind the driver, and is operated from inside the vehicle. The units are approved for use only in rural areas where traffic is sparse, and may be used from a stationary or moving vehicle.

==== 'Stalker' ====
Police vehicles in New South Wales have recently been fitted with a dual-radar known as the Stalker DSR 2X, which is able to monitor vehicles moving in two different directions at the same time.

==== Other ====
NSW police also use LIDAR devices as well as vehicle speedometers and speed estimates to prosecute speeding motorists.

The TIRTL device is deployed as a speed measurement sensor in Victoria and New South Wales. The device consists of a pair of sensors embedded in the curb that use a series of infrared beams to monitor vehicles at wheel height. Although the sensors themselves are very difficult to see, they are accompanied by a standard Traffipax camera to capture images of the offence. The state of New South Wales approved the device in November 2008 for use in the state as dual red light / speed cameras (named "safety cameras" under the Roads & Traffic Authority's terminology).

Motorcycle and bicycle-mounted police in New South Wales are equipped with the binocular-styled "Pro-Lite+" LIDAR device.

== History ==
=== Victoria ===
Started with a small trial in 1985 using signed cameras with minimal effect. The major introduction was at the end of 1989 with hidden speed cameras starting at around 500 hours/month increasing to 4,000 hours/month by 1992. During the testing of the cameras the percentage of drivers speeding (over the speed camera thresholds) was 24% and by the end of 1992 this had dropped to 4%. The revenue collected by each camera dropped from $2,000/hour to $1,000/hour over 18 months. The road toll dropped from 776 in 1989 (no cameras) to 396 in 1992 (49% drop).

=== New South Wales ===
Mobile speed cameras were first used in New South Wales in 1991. In 1999 the authorities began to install fixed cameras, and signs warning of their presence, at crash black spots.

=== Western Australia ===
The government of Western Australia started using speed cameras in 1988.

== See also ==
- Point system
- Speed limits in Australia
