= Metrication opposition =

The spread of metrication around the world in the last two centuries has been met with both support and opposition.

== Metrication ==
The United States of America officially accepted the Metric System in 1878 but United States customary units remain ubiquitous outside the science and technology sector. The metric system has been largely adopted in Canada and Ireland, and partially adopted in the United Kingdom and Hong Kong, without having fully displaced imperial units from all areas of life. In other Anglophone countries such as Australia, Singapore and New Zealand, imperial units have been formally deprecated and are no longer officially sanctioned for use.

== Technical arguments ==
=== Natural evolution and human scale ===
One argument used by opponents of the metric system is that traditional systems of measurement were developed organically from actual use. Early measures were human in scale, intuitive, and imprecise, as illustrated by still-current expressions such as a stone's throw, within earshot, a cartload or a handful. These measurements' developers, living and working in an era before modern science, gave fundamental priority to ease of learning and use; moreover, the variation permissible within these measurements allowed them to be relational and commensurable: a request for a judgment of measure allowed for a variety of answers, depending on context. In parts of Malaysia, villagers asked the distance to the next village were likely to respond with three rice cookings; an approximation of the time it would take to travel there on foot. Everyone is assumed to know both how long it takes to cook rice, and how fast a person walks. Nominally standard units were also subject to contextual variations. The aune, a French ell used for measuring cloth, depended on the sort of cloth being measured, taking price and scarcity into account: an aune of silk was shorter than an aune of linen.

Nowadays most non-metric units are standardised to fixed values, which eliminates the disadvantage of imprecision while retaining the advantage of human scale. For example, the advocacy group British Weights and Measures Association has argued that metrication led to greater complexity for consumers accustomed to imperial units because, unlike the ounce, a single gram is too small a measurement in everyday life.

=== Divisibility ===
Metric opponents cite easier division of customary units as one reason not to adopt a decimalised system. For example, those customary units with ratios of 12 and 16 have more proper factors, {2, 3, 4, 6} and {2, 4, 8}, than the metric 10: {2, 5}. However, easily divisible numbers can be selected for use with metric units, e.g. 300 mm and its multiples. The number of times that these odd fractional numbers would come up has also been pointed out as a counterargument; in construction and engineering, for example, measurements would not only be likely to be in integers to begin with, but would also rarely be needed to convert to another unit.

The main disadvantage cited by critics of customary measures is the proliferation of units, their (sometimes) non-unique definition and the difficulty in remembering the ratios between them.

=== Duplication in naming and usage ===
A common argument for the metric system is that it avoids duplication of naming and the associated confusion. The most commonly cited example is pound (force) vs pound (mass), which have the same symbol and are both commonly written simply as "pounds", which can lead to costly and dangerous shipping and engineering errors. Opponents of metrication argue that this issue only occurs due to misuse; when used "properly", there is no cause for confusion.

Separately, it is also argued that customary units feature too many overlapping units. The most commonly cited examples are in liquid volume, where metric has simply litres while customary has gallons, pints, quarts, fluid ounces, and the rarely used gill, and minim, all of which cover volumes of liquid in similar ranges. Metrication opponents argue that this allows for easily listing amounts that are awkward in metric (e.g. 1 liquid pint = 568.3 mL in the UK and 473 mL in the US) but are commonly used and avoids "excessive" use of decimals and fractions. These problems however would disappear if metrication continues and they cease to become as common, replaced with a metric equivalent. For example, a pint is often rounded down to 0.5 L, otherwise sometimes rounded up to 0.6 L.

=== Industry-specific product sizing ===
Metric-opposed artisans and practitioners may be concerned by certain dimensions being less memorable with metric units. As the table below shows, industries have addressed such concerns by using a "hard conversion" into metric units of the dimensions involved. (Metric conversion also gives the opportunity to "rationalize" the range of sizes which are available.):

Industry	Common reference	Metric reference
Carpentry	4 ft × 8 ft plywood	1219 mm × 2438 mm (exact); 1200 mm × 2400 mm (Europe); 2400 mm × 1200 mm (Australia/NZ – Largest value first)
Carpentry	2" by 4"	50.8 mm × 101.6 mm (exact – however planing makes the actual dimensions narrower.); 50 mm × 100 mm (Europe) (However, planing makes the actual dimensions 3~8 mm narrower); 90 mm × 45 mm (Australia/NZ – Accurate "rationalized" planed values are used, with the largest value first.)

== Political arguments ==
=== Tradition ===
Traditionalists consider the retention of traditional non-metric units as a form of traditionalism, valuing historic usage spanning centuries.

Non-metric units often have had different values in different times and places, and some units such as the stone even had different definitions depending on the type of object measured. At the time of the French Revolution there were over 5000 different foot measures. The current UK imperial system is based on the Weights and Measures Act 1824 (5 Geo. 4. c. 74), dating from about 30 years after the founding of the metric system, and some of its units differ very significantly from the United States customary units of the same name.

By contrast, the metric system has remained unchanged (for most practical purposes) since it was first defined. Even though the metre was initially defined to equal one ten-millionth of the length of the meridian through Paris from pole to the equator, the first prototype metre bar was subsequently found to be short by 0.2 millimetres (because researchers miscalculated the flattening of the Earth). Nevertheless, this original reference metre was retained, leaving the exact distance from equator to pole slightly more than ten million metres. The need for a more practical and reproducible definition of the metre and advances in metrology have led to increased precision in the definition, so that it is now defined as the length travelled by light in a vacuum during the time interval of 1/299,792,458 of a second. In addition, a reference standard (a rod of platinum-iridium alloy) is maintained by the inter-governmental organisation the International Bureau of Weights and Measures, and calibration of a standard metre is usually achieved (to one part in a billion, or slightly better in some recent installations) by counting 1,579,800.298728 wavelengths of the ultra-fine (3s^{2} to 2p^{4}) emission line of helium–neon laser light (this wavelength being approximately 632.99139822 nm in a vacuum).

=== Government compulsion ===
The adoption of metric units has required some government compulsion and some have argued that such policies are wrong in principle. Compulsory standards of weights and measures go back as far as Magna Carta. In 1824 in Britain, the Weights and Measures Act ("An Act for ascertaining and establishing Uniformity of Weights and Measures") consolidated the various gallons in use at the time and established a new imperial gallon, and prohibited the use of the older units, including what the United States now calls customary US measure.

Anti-metrication in the UK often manifests itself in conjunction with Euroscepticism, though the UK had taken steps toward compulsory metrication prior to European Union membership: in 1951, a Board of Trade committee unsuccessfully recommended metrication to the government, ten years before the UK first applied to join the EEC. The Board of Trade initiated metrication in 1965, with a target completion date of 1975 and the Metrication Board was established in 1968, five years before the UK actually joined the European Economic Community (on its second attempt). The EU's own Units of Measurement Directive dated from 1971 and was substantially revised in 1979.

All Statutory Instruments about metrication since 1985 have relied on powers derived from the UK European Communities Act 1972. This helped to reinforce anti-EU sentiment, as the British Parliament does not vote on such measures. More recently, opponents of metrication have asserted that legal compulsion under the Weights and Measures Act 1985 to adopt the metric system instead of their traditional weights and measures is an infringement of the right to freedom of speech, though this claim has been consistently rejected by the courts. On 25 February 2004, the European Court of Human Rights rejected an application from some British shopkeepers who said that their human rights had been violated.

On 8 May 2007, several British newspapers including The Times used correspondence between Giles Chichester MEP and EU Commissioner Günter Verheugen to report that the European Commission had decided to allow meat, fish, fruit and vegetables to continue to be sold in pounds and ounces. These reports did not mention that pounds and ounces would only retain supplementary unit status. On 10 September, the EU Commission published proposed amendments to the Units of Measurement Directive that would permit supplementary units (such as pounds and ounces) to be used indefinitely alongside, but not instead of, the units catalogued in the Units of Measurement Directive. The reporting of this decision in the British press was sufficiently misleading that the Roger Marles, Head of [British] Trading Standards, issued the following statement:

The legal position on the use of imperial measures has not changed. Pre-packed goods and goods sold loose from bulk, such as fruit and vegetables, are still required to be sold in metric quantities and weighing scales must be calibrated in metric units of measurement. Suggestions that goods can now be sold in pounds and ounces are incorrect.

In the US, there is also government compulsion with weights and measures. Federal and state laws control the labelling of goods for sale in the supermarket, drugs, wine, liquor, etc. The US Fair Packaging and Labeling Act mandates that measurement must be in both metric and US customary units. However, wine must be bottled in 50 ml, 100 ml, 187 ml, 375 ml, 500 ml, 750 ml, 1 litre, 1.5 litre, or 3 litre sizes. Containers over 3 litres must be bottled in quantities of whole numbers of litres. No other sizes may be bottled. Spirits must also be sold in metric quantities.

NASA, the United States' space agency, has taken a less compulsory approach. On 29 March 2010, NASA decided to avoid making its proposed Constellation rocket system metric-compliant, especially due to pressure from manufacturers; ultimately the program was discontinued. It had been predicted that it would cost US$368 million to convert to metric measurements for parts made by both NASA and external companies. Constellation would have borrowed technology from the 1970s-era Space Shuttle program, which used non-metric measurements in software and hardware. NASA's non-compulsory position has contributed to at least one major mission-failure: in 1999, Lockheed Martin's use of English units caused the disintegration of NASA's $328 million Mars Climate Orbiter. Despite NASA's non-compulsory policy, commercial space manufacturer SpaceX currently designs its systems (e.g., Dragon and Falcon 9) using metric units.

=== High modernism and legibility ===
Commentator Ken Alder noted that on the eve of the French Revolution a quarter of a million different units of measure were in use in France; in many cases the quantity associated with each unit of measure differed from town to town and often from trade to trade. He claimed that the metric system originated in the ideology of Pure Reason from the more radical element of the French Revolution, that it was devised in France to try to make France "revenue-rich, militarily potent, and easily administered", and that it was part of a conscious plan to transform French culture, meant to unify and transform French society: "As mathematics was the language of science, so would the metric system be the language of commerce and industry." In his 1998 monograph Seeing Like a State: How Certain Schemes to Improve the Human Condition Have Failed, James C. Scott argued that central governments attempt to impose what he calls "legibility" on their subjects. Local customs concerning measurements, like local customs concerning patronymics, tend to come under severe pressure from bureaucrats. Scott's thesis is that in order for schemes to improve the human condition to succeed, they must take into account local conditions, and that the high-modernist ideologies of the 20th century have prevented this. Scott cites the enforcement of the metric system as a specific example of this sort of failed and resented "improvement" imposed by centralizing and standardizing authority. While the metric system was introduced in the French law by the revolutionary government in April 1795, it did not immediately displace traditional measurements in the popular mind. In fact, its use was initially associated with officialdom and elitism as François-René remarked in 1828: "Whenever you meet a fellow who, instead of talking arpents, toises, and pieds, refers to hectares, metres, and centimetres, rest assured, the man is a prefect." However, it was largely used in France and in other countries by July 1837 when the decimal metric system was finally decided upon and considered the only official measurement system to be used in France.

=== Price inflation ===
The advocacy group British Weights and Measures Association argues that adopting metric measures in shops, especially in supermarkets, gives an opportunity for traders to increase prices covertly. They give numerous examples of packaged groceries to back up this contention.

When Pepsi became the first in the United States to sell soft drinks in two-litre bottles instead of two-quart (US) (1.89 litre) bottles, it was a success, and two-litre bottles are now well-established in the American soft drink market, though fluid ounces remain the usual unit of measure for cans.

The move to smaller units (e.g., millilitre vs fluid ounce, gram vs ounce) allows manufacturers to move sizes of packaging up and down with more precision using whole numbers. For example, a 2-ounce bag of chips may be altered to 50 grams, then to 45 grams. Likewise, a variety of packaging sizes may arise, such as 690 grams (about 24 oz) or 1200 grams (about 42 oz), resulting from conversion and rounding of customary units. However, the precise adjustment of packaging sizes is also possible using customary units, e.g., the 2-ounce bag can be downsized to 1.8 and 1.6 ounces as well.

The Australian experience of metric conversion showed no evidence of price inflation caused by metrication.

== British Weights and Measures Association ==
British Weights and Measures Association
- Abbreviation: BWMA
- Formation: 1995
- Type: Advocacy group
- Website: bwmaorg.uk

The current British Weights and Measures Association, or BWMA, is an advocacy group established in the United Kingdom in 1995, founded by Vivian Linacre. The current body was established in 1995, but there had also been a predecessor organisation, also called the BWMA, that was established in 1904, and lapsed after the First World War.

=== Aim of the BWMA ===
The BWMA's stated aim is to uphold the freedom to use the Imperial system and to oppose the compulsory imposition of the metric system in the UK. The BWMA's campaign parallels the evolution of the Eurosceptic viewpoint of the UK's relationship with the EU – its founder, Vivian Linacre, stood for election as a UK Independence Party candidate in 1995, the same year as he founded the BWMA – famously asking the controversial eurosceptic Enoch Powell for endorsement of his political campaign.

By the time of the modern BWMA's founding, metrication in the United Kingdom was far advanced, having begun in 1962. British schoolchildren had been educated using only metric measures since 1974 (earlier in some places), and British industry had changed to using metric tools and equipment during the 1980s and were, in most cases, manufacturing to metric standards.

=== Opposition ===
The UK Metric Association (UKMA) is a rival organisation that campaigns for compulsory Metrication in the United Kingdom for all legal and official purposes, including trade and road signs.

== See also ==
- Decimal time
- Frank Mankiewicz
- French Republican Calendar
- Lyn Nofziger
- Mesures usuelles
- Metrication in the United Kingdom
  - Metric Martyrs
- Metrication in the United States
- SI prefix
- Units of measurement
