= UK Metric Association =

British advocacy group for metrication

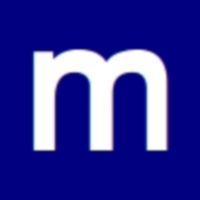
- Abbreviation: UKMA
- Formation: 1999 (Constitution adopted in 2002)
- Type: Advocacy group
- Purpose: Promote metrication in the United Kingdom
- Website: ukma.org.uk

The UK Metric Association, or UKMA, is an advocacy group in the United Kingdom that argues for completion of metrication in the United Kingdom and advocates the use of the metric system among the general public in the UK.

== History ==
UKMA was founded by Chris Keenan in 1999 and formally associated in 2002 as an independent, non-party political, single-issue organisation. Later, an e-mail forum was started for supporters of metrication. In 2005, a website called ThinkMetric to help and encourage the general public to think in metric units was launched. In 2006, a blog called MetricViews was launched.

The current chair of UKMA is Peter Burke, and the secretary is Ronnie Cohen. As of April 2023, its patrons are Gavin Esler, Jim Al-Khalili, Lord Kinnock and Lord Taverne.

== Campaigns ==
In July 2004, UKMA published its report, "A Very British Mess", as part of its campaign to end the simultaneous use of imperial and metric measurements and for the Government to complete the switch to metric units. In the foreword, its patron Geoffrey Howe confesses that "I didn’t challenge the decision to abolish the Metrication Board, when I was Chancellor of the Exchequer. I didn’t often run away from difficult decisions - but this is one that I did duck."

In February 2006, UKMA called for the Government to set a date for the conversion of road signs from imperial to metric units.

== Opposition ==
The aims of UKMA contrast with those of the British Weights and Measures Association (BWMA), which opposes what it describes as "compulsory use of the metric system". BWMA also campaigns against what it calls "unlawful metric pedestrian signs". It claims that "hundreds of unlawful metric signs have been converted back to imperial, following letters of complaint by BWMA and its supporters".

== See also ==
- Metric Martyrs – a group of English greengrocers who were convicted for using unapproved scales
- Metrication
- US Metric Association – the US metrication advocacy group that inspired the founding of the UKMA
