= Metrication in the United Kingdom =

Adoption of the metric system of measurements

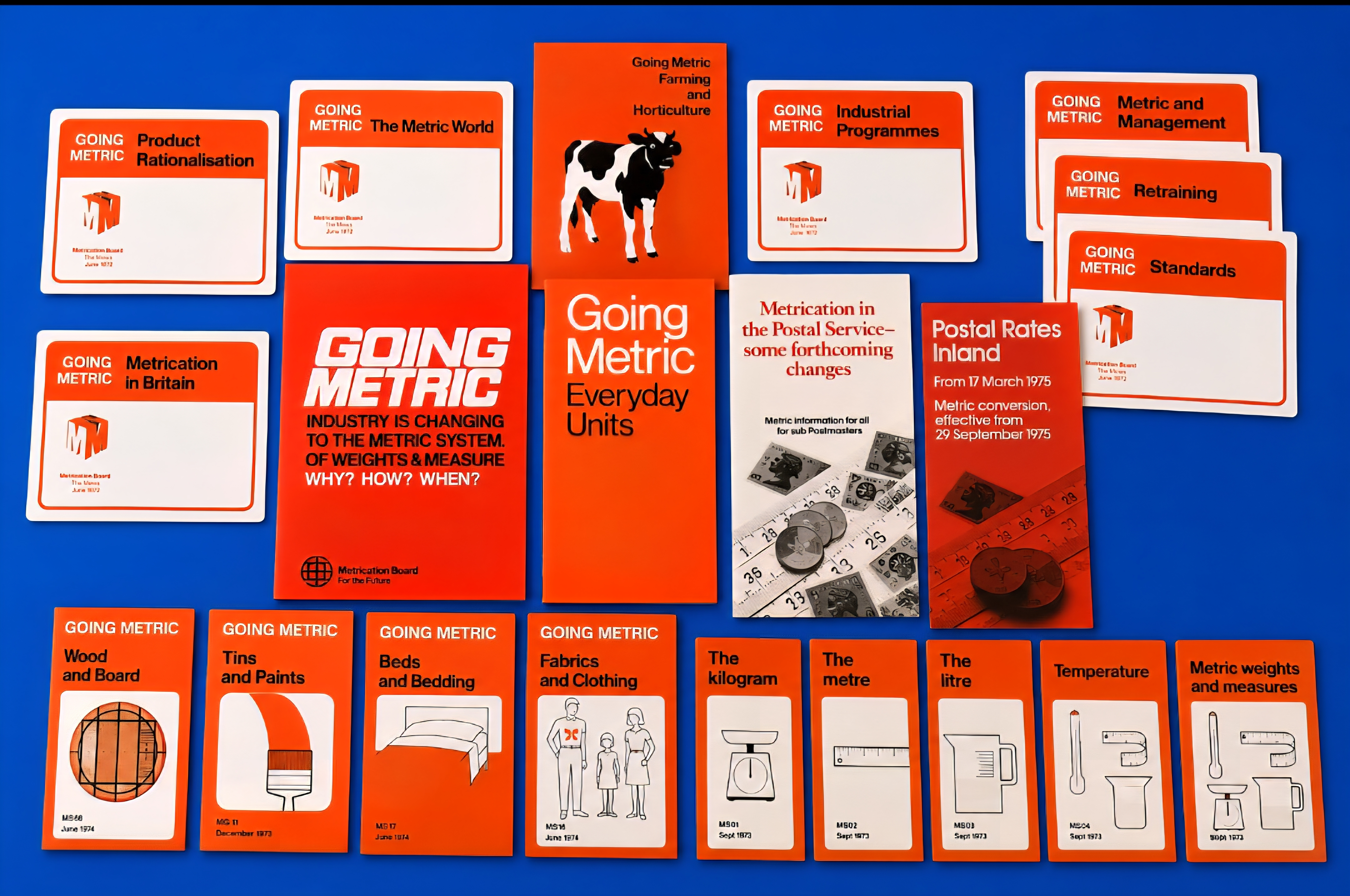
Metrication Board publications and educational materials produced during the United Kingdom metrication programme in the 1970s

Metrication is the act or process of converting to the metric system of measurement. The United Kingdom, through voluntary and mandated laws, has metricated most of government, industry, commerce, and scientific research to the metric system; however, the previous measurement system (imperial units) is still used in society.

As of 2026, imperial units remain authorised as primary units only for road traffic signs and speed measurement (the mile, yard, foot and inch); (Note: The yard was soft-metricated in 1959, when the UK and US redefined it as exactly 0.9144 metre; the 1959 agreement was later carried into statute by the Weights and Measures Act 1985, which fixes the yard as exactly 0.9144 metre, the foot as one third of a yard (30.48 cm), the inch as one thirty-sixth of a yard (2.54 cm), and the mile as 1,760 yards (1.609344 km).) for draught beer and cider and for milk sold in returnable containers (the pint); (Note: Under Schedule 1 to the Weights and Measures Act 1985, the gallon was soft-metricated at exactly 4.54609 litres (4,546.09 ml), with the pint, one eighth of a gallon, equal to 568.26125 ml.) and for transactions in precious metals (the troy ounce). (Note: Under Schedule 1 to the Weights and Measures Act 1985, the troy ounce was soft-metricated at exactly 31.1034768 grams.) Their use is compulsory for road distance and speed signs and for draught beer and cider, but optional for milk and precious metals, which may equally be sold in metric units. Imperial units may also be used alongside metric units as "supplementary indications" for trade.

Due to metrication many imperial units have been phased out. In England, the national curriculum requires pupils to use metric units and to know approximate equivalences with the imperial units still in common use. The public is familiar with both systems, and which units people use depends more on context and age than on a general preference for one over the other: imperial units persist for personal height and weight, while younger people are more likely than older people to use metric units for cooking and short distances.

A royal commission considered a decimal system of weights and measures as early as 1819 and rejected it, and Parliament declined to make metric units compulsory on several occasions thereafter. Some industries and government agencies had nonetheless metricated, or were in the process of metricating, by the mid-1960s. A formal government policy to support metrication was agreed by 1965. This policy, initiated in response to requests from industry, was to support voluntary metrication, with costs picked up where they fell. In 1969, the government created the Metrication Board as a quango to promote and coordinate metrication. The treaty of accession to the European Economic Community (EEC), which the United Kingdom joined in 1973, obliged the United Kingdom to incorporate into domestic law all EEC directives, including the use of a prescribed SI-based set of units for many purposes within five years. From 1976 the government began issuing statutory instruments making metric quantities mandatory in certain sectors, an approach reinforced after a voluntary agreement among carpet retailers collapsed in 1977 when a large chain reverted to pricing by the square yard rather than the square metre to make its prices appear cheaper.

In 1980, government policy shifted again to prefer voluntary metrication, and the Metrication Board was abolished. By the time the Metrication Board was wound up, all the economic sectors that fell within its remit except road signage and parts of the retail trade sector had metricated, and most pre-packaged goods were sold using the prescribed units. Mandatory use of prescribed units for retail sales took effect in 1995 for packaged goods and in 2000 for goods sold loose by weight. The use of "supplementary indications" or alternative units (generally the traditional imperial units formerly used) was originally to have been permitted for only a limited period, that period being extended a number of times due to public resistance, until in 2009 the requirement to ultimately cease use of traditional units alongside metric units was finally removed.

British scientists and engineers have been at the forefront of the development of metrication. In 1861 a committee of the British Association for the Advancement of Science (BAAS), whose members included James Prescott Joule, William Thomson (later Lord Kelvin) and James Clerk Maxwell, began the work that led to the definition of several electrical units. In 1882 the British company Johnson, Matthey & Co manufactured standard metres and kilograms for the signatories of the Metre Convention.

== Foundations for metrication (pre-1965) ==
=== Nineteenth-century proposals ===
A royal commission on weights and measures reported in 1819 against a decimal system, concluding that the existing subdivisions were more convenient in practice than a decimal scale and that there was no sufficient reason to alter the established standards of length. The commission acknowledged the French metre, giving its length in inches, but saw the advantage of a standard derived from nature as slight. Its recommendations formed the basis of the Weights and Measures Act 1824, which established a single set of imperial units for the whole United Kingdom, replacing the various English, Scottish and local measures then in use.

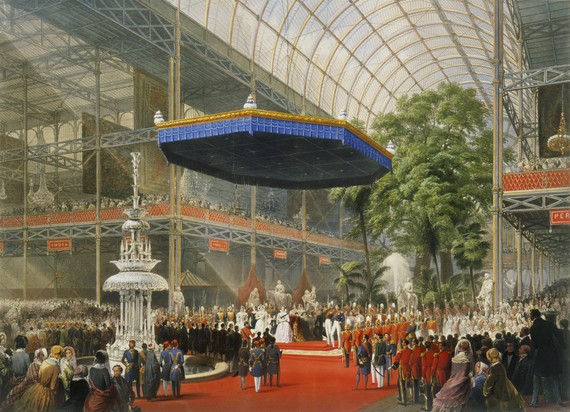
Queen Victoria opens the Great Exhibition in the Crystal Palace in Hyde Park, London, in 1851. Judges in the exhibition were hampered by the variety of units of measure in use.

The difficulties of handling multiple currencies and systems of units at the Great Exhibition of 1851 triggered calls for the standardisation of units across Europe, with the metric system suggested as the natural choice. In 1854 the mathematician Augustus De Morgan was influential in setting up the Decimal Association to lobby for the decimalisation of both measurement and coinage. In 1862 the Select Committee on Weights and Measures favoured introducing decimalisation alongside metric weights and measures, and a Royal Commission on the introduction of the metric system reported in 1869.

A bill that would have mandated the use of the metric system throughout the British Empire passed its first and second readings in the House of Commons, but was rejected at committee stage as impractical. After pressure from the astronomers George Airy and Sir John Herschel, it was watered down to legalise the use of the metric system in contracts only, and passed in that form as a Private Member's Bill in 1864. Ambiguous wording in the 1864 act meant that traders who possessed metric weights and measures remained liable to arrest under the Weights and Measures Act 1835 (5 & 6 Will. 4 c. 63).

=== Failed attempts at compulsion ===
Parliament passed the Weights and Measures (Metric System) Act 1897 (60 & 61 Vict. c. 46), which legalised metric units for all purposes without making them compulsory. A select committee reporting the same year went further, recommending that metrication become compulsory by 1899.

In 1902 an Empire conference decided that metrication should be compulsory across the British Empire. A Weights and Measures (Metric System) Bill originated by Lord Kelvin was introduced in the House of Lords by Lord Belhaven in 1904, supported by petitions in favour of the metric system. The government offered no opposition to the second reading on the understanding that the bill would be referred to a select committee. A select committee reported in 1907, and a bill was drafted proposing compulsory metrication by 1910 together with the decimalisation of coinage.

The matter was dropped in the face of war and depression, and was not raised again until the White Paper of 1951, which followed the Hodgson Committee report of 1949. That report unanimously recommended compulsory metrication and currency decimalisation within ten years, framing the question as whether to maintain two legal systems of measurement or to abolish the imperial one. It also recommended that any change be made in concert with the Commonwealth and the United States, that the United Kingdom adopt a decimal currency, and that the United Kingdom and United States harmonise their definitions of the yard by reference to the metre. British industry rejected the Hodgson report, but in 1959 the two countries redefined their yards as 0.9144 m exactly.

=== Renewed interest ===
The British Standards Institution (BSI) began formally stimulating discussion about metrication in May 1962 by issuing a short statement on the subject. The introduction of the metric system was also discussed at the Fifth Commonwealth Standards Conference in Sydney in October 1962. In October 1963, following inquiries by its committees, the BSI stated that changes in the field of measurement were inevitable and that they should be directed towards making the metric system the primary system of weights and measures in the United Kingdom as soon as possible.

== Principal phase of metrication (1965–1980) ==
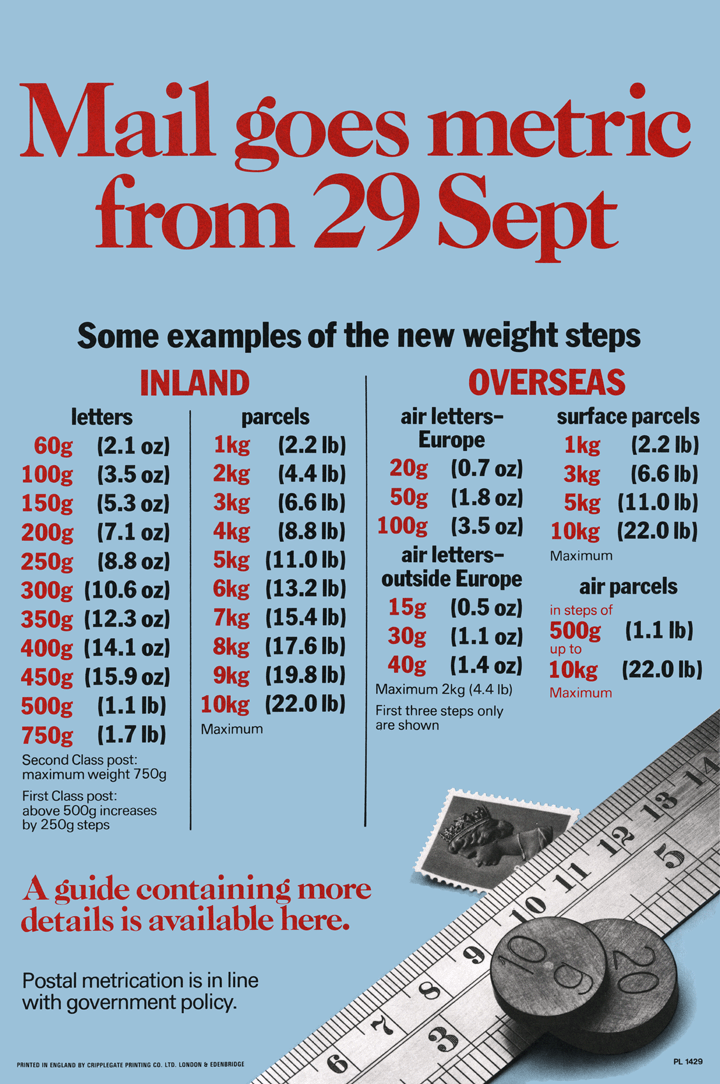
A 1975 UK Post Office poster explaining the introduction of metric postal weight steps as part of the wider British metrication programme

In 1965, the then Federation of British Industries informed the British government that its members favoured the adoption of the metric system, though some sectors emphasised the need for a voluntary system of adoption. The Board of Trade, on behalf of the government, agreed to support a ten-year metrication programme. The programme was to be voluntary and the costs of change were to be borne where they fell, though the need for legislation was accepted without a date being set for it.

Work on adapting specifications started almost as soon as the government first gave its approval in 1965. The BSI took the lead in coordinating the efforts of industry, and where appropriate working with the International Organization for Standardization (ISO), CEE, CEN and CENELEC while the Royal Society liaised with professional societies, schools and the like. Initially the BSI targeted 1,200 basic standards which were converted to metric units by 1970. Most of the remaining 4,000 standards were converted in the ensuing five years.

There were three principal ways in which metrication was implemented:

- Hard metrication, which resulted in new products based on round metric quantities: for example A4 paper (Note: A sheet of A4 paper has an area of 0.0625 m^{2} (i.e. 1/16), A3 an area of 0.125 m^{2} (i.e. 1/8) ... and A0 an area of 1 m^{2}.) replaced both foolscap and quarto paper; and in rugby union 5-, 10-, and 22-metre lines replaced the 5-, 10-, and 25-yard lines respectively.
- Soft metrication, where existing standards were rewritten to convert imperial measurements to metric without changing the item itself.
- Revision of measurement techniques, in cases where the concepts behind the existing standard or practice were found to be archaic. One such revision was to define the strength of alcoholic drink as a percentage alcohol by volume rather than, in the case of whisky, in "degrees proof".

=== The Metrication Board ===
Metric Britain logo, Metrication Board

In July 1968, following the publication of a report from the Standing Joint Committee on Metrication, the government announced that an advisory metrication board would be set up as soon as possible, to oversee the metrication process, with a target completion date of the end of 1975. The report favoured the board being made up of part-time members drawn from commerce and industry, with government, education and consumer interests also being represented. In December 1968, the government announced the set-up of the Metrication Board to coordinate the metrication programme, with Lord Ritchie-Calder being appointed as chairman. By this time much of the groundwork, especially rewriting of many British Standards using metric units, had been done and many of the industries that stood to benefit from metrication had already metricated, or had a metrication programme in progress.

=== Policy review ===
The general election of 18 June 1970 resulted in a change of government and four months later, on 27 October 1970, following an anti-metrication motion being tabled calling on the newly elected Conservative Party government not to continue with the previous government's metrication commitments, the government announced that a White Paper would be produced to examine the cost, savings, advantages and disadvantages of a change to the metric system. During the debate when the announcement was made, Conservative MPs complained that metrication was being introduced by stealth.

The White Paper on Metrication was published in February 1972, and it set out the case for metrication and refuted the charge of metrication by stealth as metric units had been lawful for most purposes since 1897. It also reported that metrication would be necessary for the UK to join the European Common Market and that as British industry was exporting to all parts of the world they would benefit. It also reiterated the previous government's policy that metrication should be voluntary and hoped metrication would be mostly complete within ten years. The expectation was also expressed that with both the imperial and metric systems coexisting for many years, that consumers would gradually become familiar and comfortable with the metric system.

=== Progress ===
Shortly after the publication of the White Paper, the Minister of Transport announced postponement of the metrication of speed limits, which had been scheduled for 1973. The rest of the metrication programme continued, with the following completion dates:

- 1970 Electric Cable Makers Confederation, British Aerospace Companies Limited drawing and documentation, London Metal Exchange, flat glass
- 1971 Paper and board, National Coal Board designs, pharmaceuticals
- 1972 Paint industry, steel industry, building regulations
- 1974 Textile and wool transactions, leading clothing manufacturers adopt dual units
- 1975 Retail trade in fabrics and floor coverings, post office tariffs, medical practice
- 1976 Bulk sales of petroleum, agriculture and horticulture
- 1977 Livestock auctions
- 1978 Solid fuel retailing, cheese wholesaling, bread, London Commodity Market

Yet the target of completion by 1975 "in concert with the Commonwealth" was not achieved; Australia, New Zealand and South Africa all completed their metrication processes by 1980.

=== Education ===
In England and Wales, unlike Scotland, education was controlled at county council level rather than at national level. In an Administrative Memorandum of August 1967 the Department of Education and Science drew the attention of local education authorities to the government's 1965 announcement of its intention to change to the metric system, and a further memorandum in October 1969 set out the progress made in further education. In a Circular Letter of March 1968 the Department invited the bodies responsible for examinations and syllabuses in further education to consider what consequential changes would be needed. In science subjects, this meant a conversion from the cgs system to SI, in geography from the imperial system to SI while in mathematics it meant discarding the teaching of mixed unit arithmetic, a topic that took up a significant part of the time allocated in primary schools to arithmetic/mathematics and 7% of total time allocated to all subjects.

In Scotland, virtually all examinations set from 1973 onwards used SI, especially those connected with science and engineering. In England, each examination board had its own timetable: the Oxford Delegacy of Local Examinations, for example, announced a change to SI in 1968, with examinations in science and mathematics using SI by 1972, geography in 1973 and home economics and various craft subjects were converted by the end of 1976.

In 1974 the Department of Education and Science issued advice (which still stands) to schools that teaching should be conducted principally in metric terms while maintaining general familiarity with imperial units.

According to a report in 1982, children were taught the relationship between decimal counting, decimal money and metric measurements, with time being the only quantity whose units were manipulated in a mixed-unit manner.

=== Wholesale, retail and consumer industries ===
Retailing proved the hardest sector for the Metrication Board to move. Margins were thin and competition intense, so shops saw little commercial gain in converting, and the trade associations the Board had to negotiate with were numerous and did not speak with one voice.

Much of the sector nonetheless signed up to a programme coordinated by the Board, under which pre-packaged goods were converted commodity by commodity. The weakness of a voluntary approach was exposed by floor coverings. Carpet retailers had agreed in February 1975 to price by the square metre, but in 1977 a large chain returned to the square yard. The apparently lower figure, roughly £8.36 per square yard against £10.00 per square metre for the same carpet, attracted enough custom that the agreement collapsed and competitors followed. The Confederation of British Industry attributed the breakdown to the fact that traders could not rely on one another to honour voluntary agreements: firms that converted alone were undercut on apparent price by those that had not, so none wished to move first. Velkar characterises this as a network effect that made voluntary conversion in retailing unworkable without a common cut-off date.

Government policy shifted accordingly. Between 1976 and 1978 a series of statutory instruments required metric quantities for a widening range of pre-packed foods, including tea, bread, flour, oats, dried fruit, biscuits, sugar, salt and breakfast cereals. Goods sold loose by weight were not covered. A further order setting a general cut-off date for imperial pricing in the retail trade was drafted but never put to Parliament, and after the 1979 general election the incoming Conservative government abandoned it. Sally Oppenheim, the new Minister for Consumer Affairs, stated that no further compulsory metrication orders would be made.

=== Other sectors ===
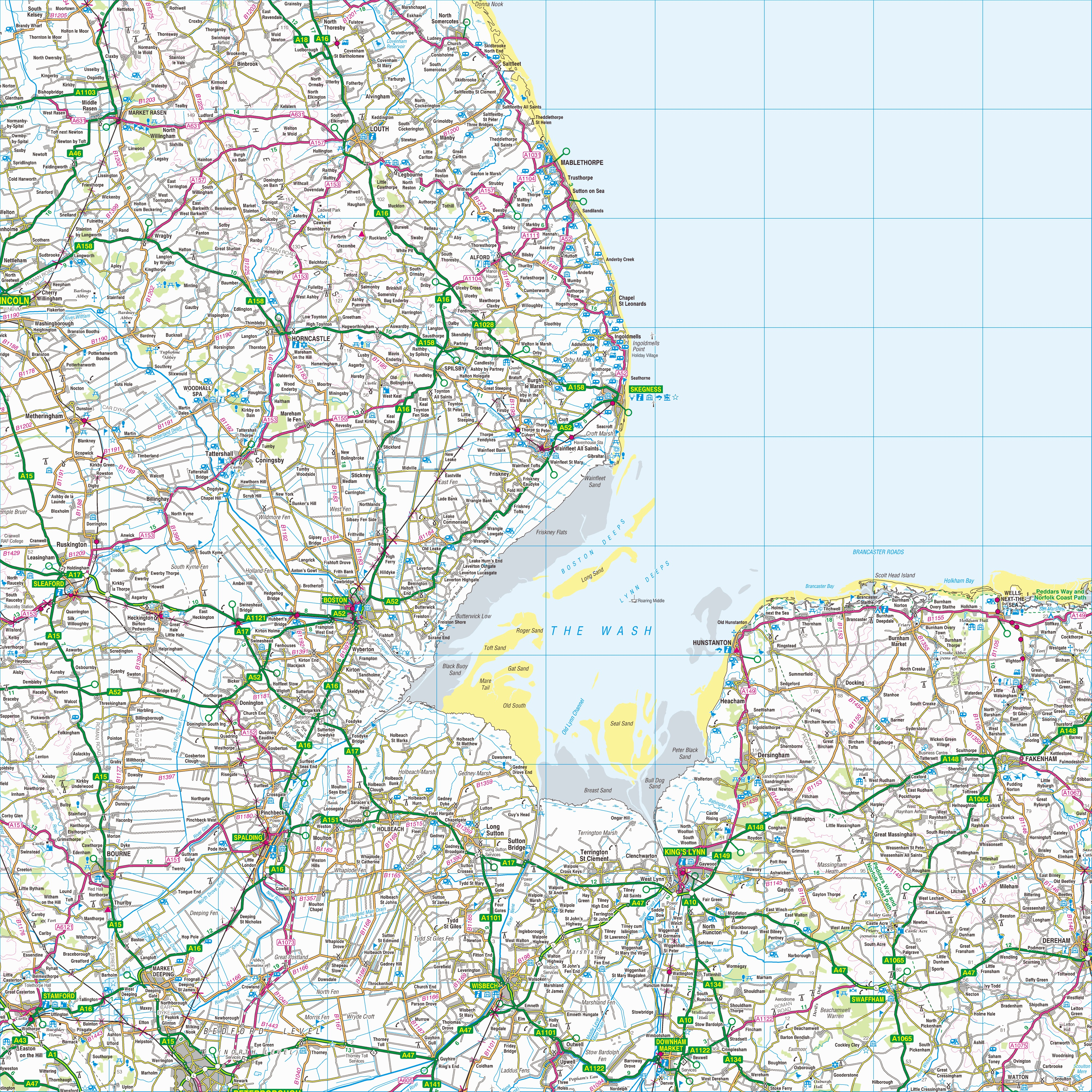
Grid square TF. The map shows The Wash and adjoining areas. The grid square itself has sides of 100 km; the smaller squares shown on the map each have sides of 10 km.

Before the Hodgson Committee, the metrication process was already in operation. A metric National Grid was used as the basis for maps published by the Ordnance Survey, the national mapping agency for Great Britain, from World War II onwards; War Office maps had had a metric grid since 1920. The Ordnance Survey decided on full metrication in 1964. The one inch to the mile (1:63,360) range of maps started being replaced with the 1:50,000 range in 1969. Admiralty tide tables were to be published in metres, and Admiralty charts were being redrawn in metric units as they came up for revision. As of 2021, road and street maps with primary scales in miles per inch were being marketed under the A-Z brand.

Another example was the Met Office, which began publishing temperatures in both Celsius and Fahrenheit in 1962 and stopped using Fahrenheit in their official reports in 1970.

Many other sectors metricated their operations in the late 1960s or early 1970s. This was not visible to the general public, though the financial pages of newspapers displayed metric prices, e.g. in the principal London commodity markets (the London Metal Exchange, and the various agricultural markets, but not the oil industry).

=== Costs ===
The basis of the British metrication programme as announced in 1965 was a voluntary adoption of the metric programme, with the costs being absorbed where they fell. As a result, the costs of and savings from metrication in the United Kingdom have not been comprehensively determined, and studies have tended to focus on specific programmes. As the programme was voluntary, industry was free to take the most cost-efficient approach. In many cases this meant installing equipment calibrated in metric units as part of an ongoing maintenance cycle rather than as part of a specific metrication programme. Such an approach was taken by the gas industry: all newly installed meters record usage in cubic metres, but many older installations still measure in cubic feet.

A 1970s study by the United Kingdom chemical industry estimated costs at £6m over seven years, or 0.25% of expected capital investment over the change period. Other estimates ranged from 0.04% of a large company's turnover spread over seven years to 2% of a small company's turnover for a single year. One large company reported that annual savings were already running at about the same level as the cost of its conversion, with further recurring gains expected.

The 1972 White Paper reported that 58% of United Kingdom exports went to countries that were already metric, and that a further 25% went to countries that had adopted the metric system since 1950 or were in the course of changing to it, giving a total of more than 83%. The principal remaining non-metric market was the United States, where the Fair Packaging and Labeling Act originally required the quantity on consumer packages to be declared in customary inch-pound units, with metric units permitted only as an additional statement. Congress amended the Act in 1992 to require both systems, a requirement that took effect on 14 February 1994.

No authoritative figure for the national cost of metrication was ever produced. The 1972 White Paper noted that unofficial estimates of the overall cost had never been supported by statistical evidence, and concluded that no well-founded estimate existed or could exist, partly because metrication was usually undertaken alongside other changes such as redesign or rationalisation of product ranges, and partly because firms treated their costings as confidential. That absence of reliable figures itself became a rhetorical weapon. The British Equipment Trade Association had estimated in 1968 that the change would cost the country £5 billion, a figure repeatedly cited in parliamentary debate; the CBI dismissed it as a gross overestimate and put the likely national cost at £441–838 million, or at most £1.3 billion. Velkar argues that the wide divergence between such estimates made all of them unreliable, which in turn gave opponents of metrication a ready argument for halting it.

There are real costs to business of manufacturing goods in two units of measurement. A survey of engineering firms published in 1980 put the extra cost of marking goods in both imperial and metric units at about 3% of domestic sales, 9% of gross profit and 14% of net profit, or an average of some £52,000 per firm each year. The same survey estimated that the sector had spent £530 million on metrication to that point, that completing the change would cost a further £2.04 billion, and that £1.24 billion of that was attributable to conversion programmes being left unfinished. The CBI used these figures in pressing the government for compulsory metrication.

=== European Economic Community ===
In 1973 the United Kingdom joined the European Economic Community. Metrication had by then been under way for eight years, and directive EEC directive 71/354/EEC required the United Kingdom to define formally in law a number of units of measure, hitherto formally undefined in law, including those for electric current (ampere), electric potential difference (volt), temperature (degree Celsius and kelvin), pressure (pascal), energy (joule) and power (watt).

In the late 1970s, the UK government asked the EEC to postpone the deadlines for the introduction of metric units. The result was the repeal of directive 71/354/EEC and the introduction of directive 80/181/EEC.

- A number of units that had been proscribed under Directive 71/354/EEC could continue to be used until the end of 1985.
- A number of imperial units including the pound, ounce, yard, foot, inch, gallon and pint could continue to be used until the end of 1989.
- The mile, yard, foot and inch could be used on road traffic signs, distance and speed measurement, pints could be used for the sale of milk in returnable containers and for the measurement of draught beer and cider, acres could be used for purposes of land registration and troy ounces could be used when dealing with precious metals until a date to be determined by the states in question.
- Supplementary units were permitted until the end of 1989, provided that the supplementary indicator was not the dominant unit and was no larger in size than the corresponding metric indication.

== Further metrication in retail and transport (1980 to present) ==
=== Metrication Board final report ===
In its final report, published in 1980, the Metrication Board wrote:

Today metric units are used in many important areas of British life – including education; agriculture; construction; industrial materials; much of manufacturing; the wholesaling of petrol, milk, cheese and textiles; fatstock markets and many port fish auctions, nearly all the principal prepacked foods; posts and telecommunications: most freight and customs tariffs; all new and revised Ordnance Survey maps; and athletics. Nevertheless, taken as a whole, Britain is far from being wholly metric.

The report identified two major sectors that had not then been metricated: the retailing of weighed-out foods and many sales by length, volume or area (metricated in 2000 (Note: Imperial units remained permitted alongside metric as supplementary indications, and the pint and troy ounce exemptions were unaffected.)); and speed limits and road distance, height and weight signs (still imperial, with metric added to new height and width signs from 2016).

=== Retail industry ===
By the beginning of 1980, 95% of the "basic shopping basket" of foods were sold in metric quantities, with only a few products not being sold in prescribed metric quantities. The final report of the Metrication Board catalogues dried vegetables, dried fruit, flour and flour products, oat products, cocoa and chocolate powder, margarine, instant coffee, pasta, biscuits, bread, sugar, corn flakes, salt, white fats, dripping and shredded suet as being sold by prescribed metric quantities, while no agreement had been reached with the industry regarding jam, marmalade, honey, jelly preserves, syrup, cereal grain and starches.

==== Grain and starch products (1982–1990) ====
Barley kernels, pearl barley, rice, sago, semolina and tapioca were given a metric range alongside the existing imperial one from 1982, under the Weights and Measures Act 1963 (Grain and Farinaceous Products) Order 1981. The imperial range was withdrawn on 27 July 1990.

==== Units barred from trade use (1985) ====
The Weights and Measures Act 1985 barred from use for trade a large number of imperial units that had fallen into disuse as a result of the completed elements of the metrication programme. The units concerned were not repealed outright: they are set out in Part VI of Schedule 1 to the act, which defines each of them but prohibits their use for trade. The prohibition also extends to the term "metric ton", the tonne being the authorised unit of 1,000 kilograms.

Units defined in Part VI of Schedule 1 to the Weights and Measures Act 1985 as not permitted for use for trade (as enacted)
Quantity	Unit	Definition in the act
Length	Furlong	220 yards
Length	Chain	22 yards
Area	Square mile	640 acres
Area	Rood	1,210 square yards
Area	Square inch	1/144 square foot
Volume	Cubic yard	A volume equal to that of a cube each edge of which measures one yard
Volume	Cubic foot	1/27 cubic yard
Volume	Cubic inch	1/1728 cubic foot
Capacity	Bushel	8 gallons
Capacity	Peck	2 gallons
Capacity	Fluid drachm	1/8 fluid ounce
Capacity	Minim	1/60 fluid drachm
Mass or weight	Ton	2,240 pounds
Mass or weight	Hundredweight	112 pounds
Mass or weight	Cental	100 pounds
Mass or weight	Quarter	28 pounds
Mass or weight	Stone	14 pounds
Mass or weight	Dram	1/16 ounce
Mass or weight	Grain	1/7000 pound
Mass or weight	Pennyweight	24 grains
Mass or weight	Ounce apothecaries	480 grains
Mass or weight	Drachm	1/8 ounce apothecaries
Mass or weight	Scruple	1/3 drachm
Mass or weight	Metric ton	1,000 kilograms
Mass or weight	Quintal	100 kilograms

==== Further imperial units phased out (1995) ====
The Units of Measurement Regulations 1994 implemented the amendments made by Council Directive 89/617/EEC to Council Directive 80/181/EEC. With effect from 1 October 1995 they made a further group of imperial units unauthorised for use for economic, public health, public safety or administrative purposes, except as supplementary indications. Exceptions allowed certain units to remain in use in specialised fields, some until 1 January 2000 and some with no end date.

Units made unauthorised on 1 October 1995, and the specialised fields in which their use continued
Unit	Continued use
Length
Inch, Foot, Yard and Mile	Road traffic signs, distance and speed measurement — no end date
Area
Square foot Square yard	Not continued
Acre	Land registration — no end date set (ceased to be a primary unit in 2010)
Volume
Fluid ounce	Beer, cider, water, lemonade and fruit juice in returnable containers — until 1 January 2000
Pint	Dispense of draught beer or cider; milk in returnable containers — no end date
Gill, Quart, and Gallon	Not continued
Mass
Ounce (avoirdupois); Pound	Goods for sale loose from bulk — until 1 January 2000
Troy ounce	Transactions in precious metals — no end date
Energy
Therm	Gas supply — until 1 January 2000

The fathom was separately permitted to remain in use for marine navigation until 1 January 2000.

Coffee had already carried a metric range alongside imperial since 1981, under the Weights and Measures Act 1963 (Coffee and Coffee Mixtures) Order 1981; regulations made at the same time as the 1994 Units of Measurement Regulations prescribed metric quantities for the remaining pre-packaged retail commodities not yet defined in metric terms. From the beginning of 1995, pre-packed coffee, coffee mixtures and coffee bags, and honey, jam and marmalade other than diabetic jam or marmalade, jelly preserves and molasses, could be sold only in the prescribed metric quantities.

Prescribed metric quantities from 1995 (Note: Coffee was permitted both ranges; the other goods were permitted only the second.)
Applies to	Prescribed metric quantities
Coffee, coffee mixtures and coffee bags	75 g (2.6 oz); 125 g (4.4 oz); 250 g (8.8 oz); 500 g (1.10 lb); 750 g (1.65 lb); Multiples of 500 g (1.10 lb)
Coffee, coffee mixtures and coffee bags; honey, jam and marmalade, jelly preserves, molasses, syrup and treacle	57 g (2 oz); 113 g (4 oz); 227 g (8 oz); 340 g (12 oz); 454 g (1 lb); 680 g (1.50 lb); Multiples of 454 g (1 lb)

Separately, measures for alcoholic drinks sold for consumption on the premises were metricated. An amendment made in 1990 to the Weights and Measures (Intoxicating Liquor) Order 1988 added 25 ml as a permitted quantity for gin, rum, vodka and whisky sold by the glass, and provided that the 1/4, 1/5 and 1/6 gill measures would not be permitted after 31 December 1994; a further amendment in July 1994 added 35 ml, and multiples of it, as a second permitted quantity. From 1 October 1995 wine sold in the glass could be sold only in measures of 125 ml or 175 ml, or multiples of those quantities; before then the size of a glass of wine was unregulated. Draught beer and cider could be sold only in quantities of 1/3 pint, 1/2 pint or multiples of 1/2 pint; the 2/3 pint measure was added on 1 October 2011.

==== Loose goods (2000) ====
With effect from 1 January 2000 the remaining time-limited exceptions lapsed, ending the authorised use of the fathom for marine navigation, the fluid ounce and pint for beer, cider, water, lemonade and fruit juice in returnable containers, the ounce and pound for goods sold loose from bulk, and the therm for the supply of gas.

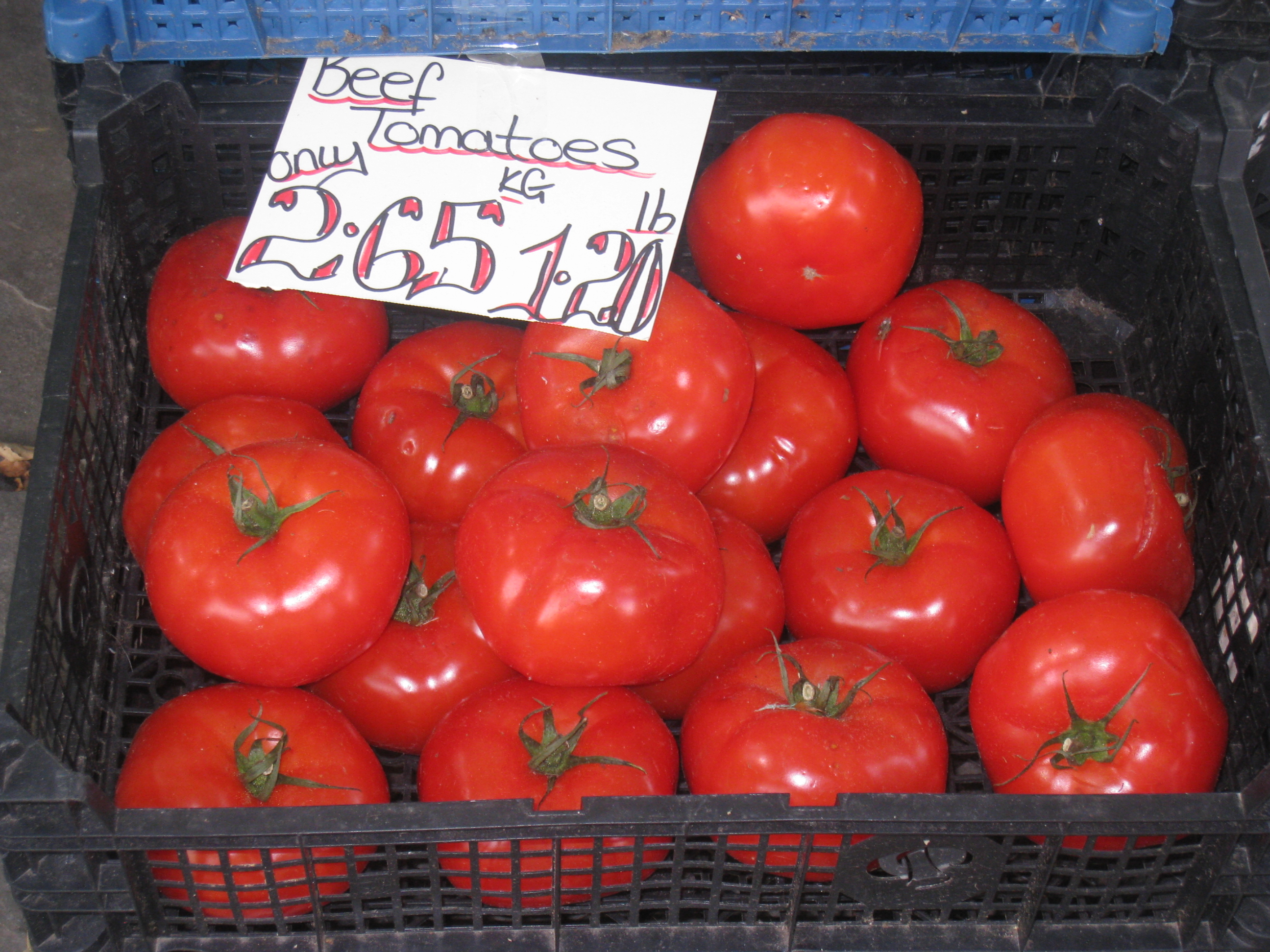
As from 1 January 2000, loose goods and goods sold from bulk had to be priced using metric units. The use of imperial units is optional. In compliance, these tomatoes are priced at £2.65/kg and £1.20/lb.

A direct result of the changes that were effective from 1 January 2000 was the requirement that most loose goods sold by weight, volume or length (for example, potatoes or tomatoes that were sold loose, or cheese or meat that was cut or weighed in front of the customer) must be priced and measured using metric units.

Some traders continued to sell produce from their market stalls using imperial-only scales from 2000. They were variously prosecuted for using unlawful scales, giving short measure and failing to display unit price per kilogram. Five traders, who became known as the Metric Martyrs, appealed unsuccessfully to the High Court, and were refused appeal to the House of Lords. Thoburn's subsequent application to the European Court of Human Rights was declared inadmissible in February 2004.

The regulations that came into force on 1 January 2000 regarding the sale of loose goods effectively made it mandatory to use metric units in the retail industry for most products, though supplementary indicators using certain imperial units were permitted. The units permitted as supplementary indications on packaged goods under the Weights and Measures (Packaged Goods) Regulations 2006 are the gallon, quart, pint, fluid ounce, pound and ounce.

==== Acre withdrawn as a primary unit (2010) ====
The UK land registries had for many years used hectares for new registrations, and on 1 January 2010 the acre ceased to be authorised as a primary unit, remaining available only as a supplementary indication.

==== Metric-only scales in the NHS (2010) ====
A LACORS report highlighted widespread problems with scales then in use. One issue raised was the risk that nurses could accidentally switch between imperial and metric units, resulting in the wrong dose being administered. The report recommended that on safety grounds NHS hospitals should use Class III (or better) metric-only scales. In March 2010 a Department of Health alert was sent to all NHS trusts endorsing these recommendations.

=== Retention of imperial units ===
During the 1990s, a series of statutory instruments relating to weighing devices and to the sale of pre-packaged goods were issued to ensure that United Kingdom law on metrology was harmonised with that of its EEC partners. In line with EEC practice, the meaning of weights displayed on pre-packaged goods was changed in 1980 to show the average weight of each item in the batch rather than the guaranteed minimum weight of each individual item. The EU Measuring Instruments Directive (Directive 2004/22/EC), which was intended to create a common market for measuring instruments across the countries of the EU, came into force on 30 October 2006 with a ten-year transition period.

The EU Units of Measurement Directive (80/181/EEC) generally required metric units but permitted imperial units in certain circumstances. In 2009, Directive 2009/3/EC amended it to make supplementary indications, such as pounds shown alongside kilograms, permanent, and removed the requirement for the UK eventually to end its remaining exemptions. Supplementary indications had themselves been time-limited: regulations made in 2001 inserted 31 December 2009 as the final date for their use into section 8(5A) of the Weights and Measures Act 1985. Rather than let that deadline take effect, the Units of Measurement Regulations 2009 omitted the words setting it, so supplementary imperial indications may now be used indefinitely. The separate exemptions for road measurements, pints and precious metals already had no expiry date.

A separate EU measure, Directive 2007/45/EC, removed most restrictions on the sizes in which pre-packaged goods could be sold. It was implemented in Great Britain by the Weights and Measures (Specified Quantities) (Pre-packed Products) Regulations 2009, allowing manufacturers to continue using traditional imperial-derived sizes, such as 454 g (1 lb) and 227 g (8 oz), without those sizes being compulsory.

Separately, EU rules on non-automatic weighing instruments required most weighing equipment used for trade to indicate mass in SI units, with limited exceptions including the troy ounce for precious metals and the metric carat for precious stones; these rules were later codified in Directive 2009/23/EC. The UK implemented these requirements through the Non-automatic Weighing Instruments Regulations 2000.

The resulting system therefore retained imperial units as supplementary indications, as primary units for a limited number of exempted purposes, and through traditional imperial-derived product sizes expressed in metric quantities, while metric units remained the basis of most trade.

=== Road and rail transport ===
Road and rail transport in the United Kingdom use a mixture of metric and imperial units. Fuel is sold by the litre and metric units are used for some infrastructure and operational purposes, but imperial units remain in use on road signs and for railway route locations and speed limits. Some applications, including vehicle speedometers and height and width restrictions on roads, use both systems together.

==== Road ====
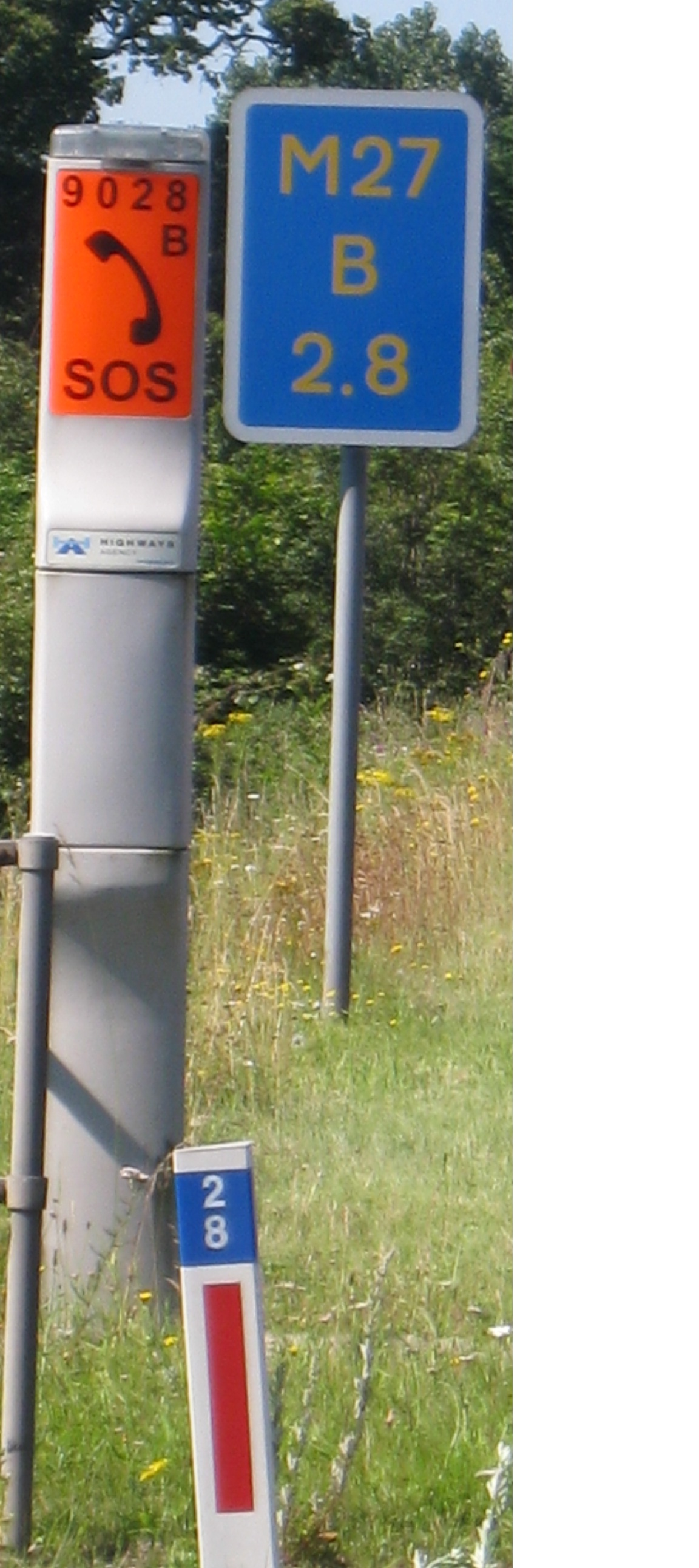
Driver location sign, and location marker post at position 2.8km on the "B" carriageway of the M27 in Hampshire

Marker posts on motorways, which identify locations for maintenance and emergency purposes, were converted to metric in the 1970s. Driver location signs, which display this location information to motorists, also use kilometres.

Department for Transport guidance on road works sets out sign placement distances in metric units, while distances shown on supplementary plates must be in imperial units. A sign reading "400 yards", for example, may be placed 400 m from the point it refers to, which is within the permitted 10% siting tolerance.

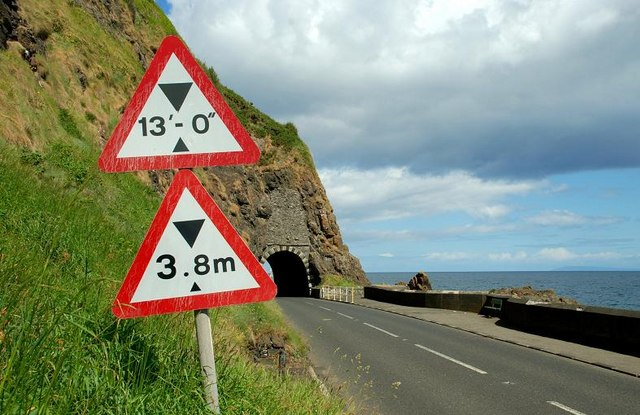
A height restriction sign showing both imperial and metric units

The Traffic Signs Regulations and General Directions 1994 allowed metric units to be shown alongside imperial units on width and height warning signs, and dual-unit signs became mandatory on 22 April 2016.

When introduced, the Traffic Signs Manual directed that imperial and metric heights be calculated separately, with different rounding rules for metric and imperial measurements. The imperial figure must be at least 3 inches (76 mm) below the measured height and is rounded down to the nearest lower multiple of 3 inches. The metric figure is calculated separately to one decimal place, with a safety margin determined by the second decimal digit. Consequently, the imperial and metric figures displayed on the same sign are not necessarily direct conversions of one another. The same metric height can therefore correspond to several different imperial heights.

Examples of signed heights
Measured headroom	Metric sign	Imperial sign
4.48 m (14 ft 8 in)	4.4 m	14 ft 3 in
4.50 m (14 ft 9 in)	4.4 m	14 ft 6 in
4.572 m (15 ft 0 in)	4.4 m	14 ft 9 in

Distances and speed limits on road signs must still be shown in imperial units only. Converting distance and speed signs to metric units has been costed several times but never carried out, and the estimates have risen considerably:

Estimated cost of converting UK road signs to metric units (nominal figures, not adjusted for inflation)
Year	Estimate	Cost
1978	Conversion of road signs from miles to kilometres	£7.5–8.5 million
2005	Department for Transport costing for replacing all road signs in a short period	£565–644 million
2007	Metrication of traffic signs (speed and distance)	£760 million

Under EU Council Directive 80/181/EEC, imperial units could be used on road signs in the United Kingdom only until a date to be fixed. That limit was removed by Directive 2009/3/EC, which came into force on 27 May 2009 and allows imperial units to remain in use for road traffic signs and speed measurement.

In 1981 petrol retailers began changing from selling fuel by the gallon to selling it by the litre. Many electro-mechanical pumps had been designed to switch between imperial and metric units but could not display prices of £2 or more per gallon. As petrol prices rose, the industry sought permission to sell by the litre. Because an imperial gallon is about 4.5 litres, this cut the displayed unit price by the same factor and allowed existing pumps to stay in service for longer.

Speedometers, and the fuel consumption figures required in car advertisements, are given in both metric and imperial units.

==== Rail ====
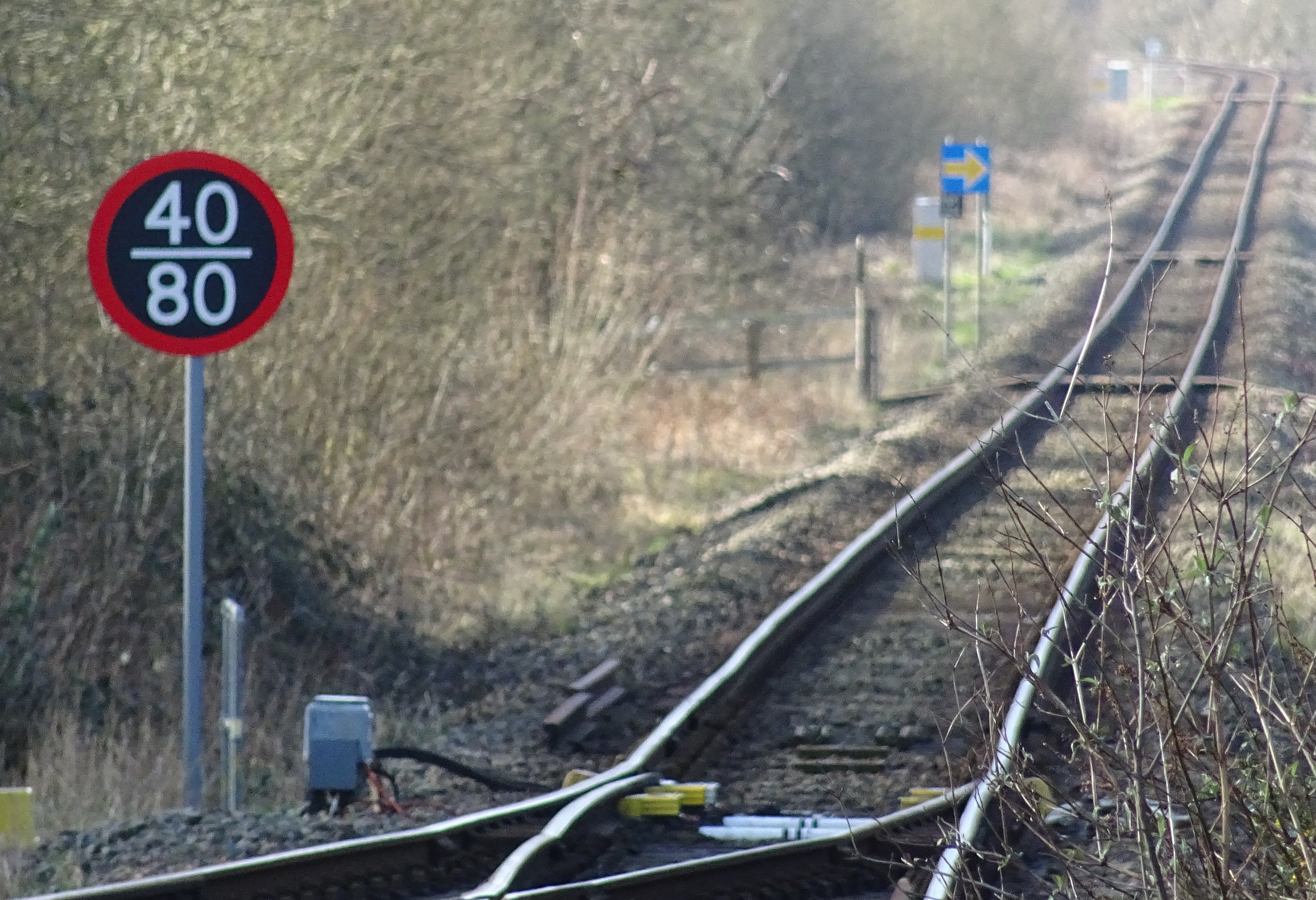
An example of a metric speed limit sign, west of Machynlleth, installed as part of the ERTMS upgrade. It shows a differential limit with different speeds for freight and passenger trains

The standard railway track gauge of 4 feet 8 1/2 inches (1,435.1 mm), set by the Gauge of Railways Act 1846, is now specified as 1,435 mm, a nominal reduction of 0.1 mm that falls within engineering tolerances.

Imperial units remain in operational use across much of the national rail network. Network Rail's Sectional Appendices give route locations in miles and chains, a chain being 22 yards (20.12 m). The chain is not an authorised unit under the Units of Measurement Regulations 1986, but it continues to be used for this purpose.

Speed limits on lines without ERTMS/ETCS are generally given in miles per hour. ETCS is specified in kilometres per hour, but British standards allow the driver's speed display to show miles per hour where needed for compatibility with existing operations. In 2013 the industry's Technical Standards Leadership Group decided that the progressive installation of ERTMS on selected routes would be used to move the national network to metric units for speeds and locations, with mileposts expected to be replaced over time by location markers at 500 m or 1 km intervals; no timetable or costs had been set.

== Current status of metrication in the UK ==
The United Kingdom is predominantly metric. The sectors identified by the Metrication Board as substantially metric by 1980 include education, agriculture, construction, manufacturing, wholesale trade, prepacked goods, postal services, freight, customs, mapping and athletics, all of which continue to use metric units as their primary system of measurement.

Of the two major sectors the Board identified as still substantially unmetricated in 1980, retail was subsequently largely metricated, while road transport remains mixed.

=== Retail and trade ===
Metric units are required for all goods sold by weight or measure, with three exceptions in which the law permits an imperial unit as the primary unit:

- draught beer and cider, which must be sold in 1/3, 1/2 or 2/3 pint or multiples of 1/2 pint;
- milk in returnable containers, which may be sold by the pint; and
- precious metals, which may be transacted in troy ounces.

Goods and services sold by a description, as opposed to a price per unit quantity, are not covered by weights and measures legislation; thus, a fence panel sold as "6 foot by 6 foot" is legal, as is a 6 × 4 inch photograph frame, but a pole sold as "50 pence per linear foot", with no accompanying metric price, would be illegal.

==== Supplementary imperial units ====
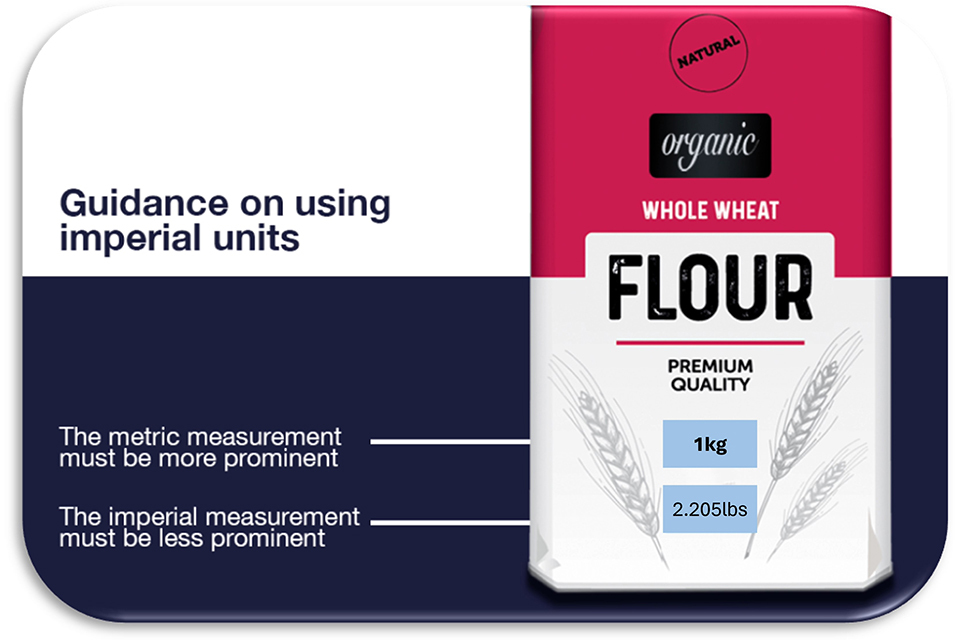
UK government guidance on the optional use of imperial units alongside metric measurements, published in December 2023

Section 8(5A) of the Weights and Measures Act 1985 places no restriction on which non-metric units may be used as a supplementary indication: any indication of quantity qualifies if it is expressed in a non-metric unit, accompanies a metric indication, and is not itself authorised in the circumstances as a primary indication. The constraint is on prominence rather than on the choice of unit, the supplementary indication being required to be "expressed in characters no larger than those of the corresponding (metric) indication". Particular regulations may narrow that choice for particular purposes. For the marking of packaged goods, the Weights and Measures (Packaged Goods) Regulations 2006 restrict supplementary indications to six imperial units: the gallon, quart, pint, fluid ounce, pound and ounce. Trading standards guidance lists a wider set of units, including the yard, foot, inch and square yard, as permitted supplementary indications for trade generally.

There are no restrictions on the units that consumers can use when asking for goods, and the use of supplementary indicators and dual measure weighing scales (provided these have been calibrated in metric) means that a consumer can see an imperial price, request an imperial quantity and be supplied with the imperial quantity, provided that the seller legally weighs out and sells the metric equivalent.

==== Imperial packaging sizes ====
Package sizes derived from former imperial quantities remain common in some UK product categories. For example, jams, sausages and golden syrup are still sold in 454 g packages, approximately equivalent to one imperial pound.

With effect from 19 September 2024 the government added further permitted sizes for pre-packed wine in Great Britain, including 568 ml, equivalent to one imperial pint, for both still and sparkling wine; the change also aligned the previously differing lists of permitted sizes for the two.

=== Road ===
Road transport is the main sector in which imperial units remain the primary units. Speed limits are set in miles per hour and distances on traffic signs are given in miles and yards, although motorway marker posts and driver location signs use kilometres, and weight limits on traffic signs are given in tonnes. Height and width warning signs must show dimensions in both feet and inches and in metres. Speedometers must be able to show speed in both miles per hour and kilometres per hour, either simultaneously or by means of a switch. Fuel is sold by the litre.

== Assessment of the British metrication programme ==
Signs in Evesham, Worcestershire. One gives a distance in yards, while the other mixes miles and metres.

The UK's failure to complete metrication has left it using both metric and imperial units. The risk was identified in 1951, when the Hodgson Committee warned that leaving people free to use either system until change became inevitable would cause more inconvenience than an ordered change within a set period. The 1965 programme was nevertheless voluntary, adopted at industry's request with government support rather than compulsion.

=== Lack of government leadership ===
Studies by NASA in 1976 and the US National Bureau of Standards in 1979 attributed the slow progress to a lack of government leadership, identifying four failings:

- The Metrication Board was not appointed at the start, leaving industry to lead without the means to implement the change, particularly in retail.
- Government provided no funding, and industry paid for much of the early work.
- No "champion" was provided, a role outside the Board's remit.
- Legislation was needed to keep the programme on track.

=== Abandonment of compulsion ===
Rather than legislate, the incoming government in 1979 stopped further compulsory metrication orders and moved to abolish the Metrication Board. The historian Aashish Velkar attributes the policy's abandonment to popular framing of metrication as something imposed by Brussels, although the commitment predated Britain's membership of the European Economic Community and some of the claims made against it were untrue.

=== Campaign for completion ===
In 2004 the UK Metric Association (UKMA) called for metrication to be completed by 2009 in its report A Very British Mess. Its chairman, Robin Paice, argued that mixed units undermined consumer protection and caused mistakes, waste and accidents, and that the costs of conversion had largely been met, except for road signs. The UKMA also says that dual pricing and dual package marking add costs for manufacturers and retailers.

=== Example of accidents, costs and wastage ===
Height-restriction sign, Greenisland, County Antrim, April 2016

Height and width limits at low bridges have long been signed in feet and inches. In 2015 the Department for Transport said that many lorry drivers, particularly younger ones who may not have been taught imperial units at school, were unfamiliar with them, and that this lack of understanding "has been implicated" in bridges being struck by over-height vehicles. Over 1,600 such strikes were reported at rail-over-road bridges in 2014/15, which the Department described as a safety issue that also delays road and rail users and leads to costly repairs to road and rail infrastructure.

Rather than replace imperial units on these signs, the government required metric units to be shown alongside them, deciding in 2015 that all new height, width and length limit signs must show both. This has its own cost. In 2009 the Department found that a triangular warning sign could not show both units, so the same height limit had to be shown twice, on two separate signs, one in feet and inches and one in metres. Each extra sign cost under £150, and the Department estimated the cost of replacing imperial-only signs with dual-unit ones at about £527,000. Against this, the Department valued the benefits at £2.3 million over ten years, on the assumption that dual-unit signs would prevent 1% of over-height bridge strikes.

== Public attitudes to metric and imperial units ==
Surveys by pollsters, campaigners and the government have used different wording and sampling, so they are not directly comparable. Broadly, they show opposition to replacing miles on roads, a strong preference for metric units in trade among consultation respondents (though polls of the general public were more mixed), and everyday use that varies by measurement and age.

Polls on completing the changeover have found more opposition than support. In 2007, an Ipsos MORI survey for The Sun found 56% opposed to switching to metric entirely and 19% in favour. A 2013 YouGov survey for the UK Metric Association found about half opposed and a quarter in favour.

=== Opposition to metric road signs ===
A YouGov survey of 4,808 adults in April 2023 found 22% supported changing road signs and speed limits from miles to kilometres and 62% opposed. Younger respondents and Londoners were more supportive; opposition was highest among Conservative and Leave voters, at 75%.

=== Preference for metric units in trade ===
After Brexit, the government consulted on allowing greater use of imperial units in trade. The consultation drew 100,938 responses, of which 98.7% favoured metric units: 81.1% backed the status quo and 17.6% metric only. It was criticised for offering no option to oppose more imperial use, and responses were self-selected. In December 2023 the government decided against changing the law, though it updated its guidance on supplementary imperial units and said it would allow wine to be sold by the pint.

Polls of the general public were more mixed. A YouGov poll of 4,535 adults on the day the plans were announced in September 2021 found 43% in favour of allowing shops to sell goods in imperial units only, 35% against and 23% undecided. When the consultation was announced in May 2022, a further YouGov poll of 2,283 adults, asking more broadly about allowing shops to sell in imperial measures, found 47% in favour, 32% against and 21% undecided. The same respondents attached little importance to the issue: 61% said it was not important to them whether shops sold in imperial or metric measures, against 30% who said it was.

=== Use varies by measurement and age ===
The units people use depend more on what is being measured, and on their age, rather than on any general preference. In 2015, 75% of 18–24-year-olds used metric units for cooking, against 28% of the over-60s.

A 2022 YouGov survey of 1,671 adults found imperial units dominant for height, a person's weight, speed and long distances, and metric units for temperature. Short distances and the weight of items were evenly split, with most under-50s using metric and most over-60s imperial.

Units Britons would use, by situation, 2022 (Note: Respondents chose between the metric unit and the imperial or other traditional unit normally used for each situation. Remaining respondents answered "don't know".)
Situation	All adults		Metric, by age	
Situation	Metric	Imperial	18–29	70+
Temperature (Note: Fahrenheit is not an imperial unit, but is the non-metric scale traditionally used in Britain.)	72%	19%	84%	54%
Weight of an item	48%	47%	81%	22%
Short distance	47%	47%	71%	12%
Weight of a person	24%	72%	44%	11%
Height	14%	82%	18%	5%
Long distance	10%	86%	18%	3%
Speed	7%	90%	11%	2%

== British contributions to the metric system ==
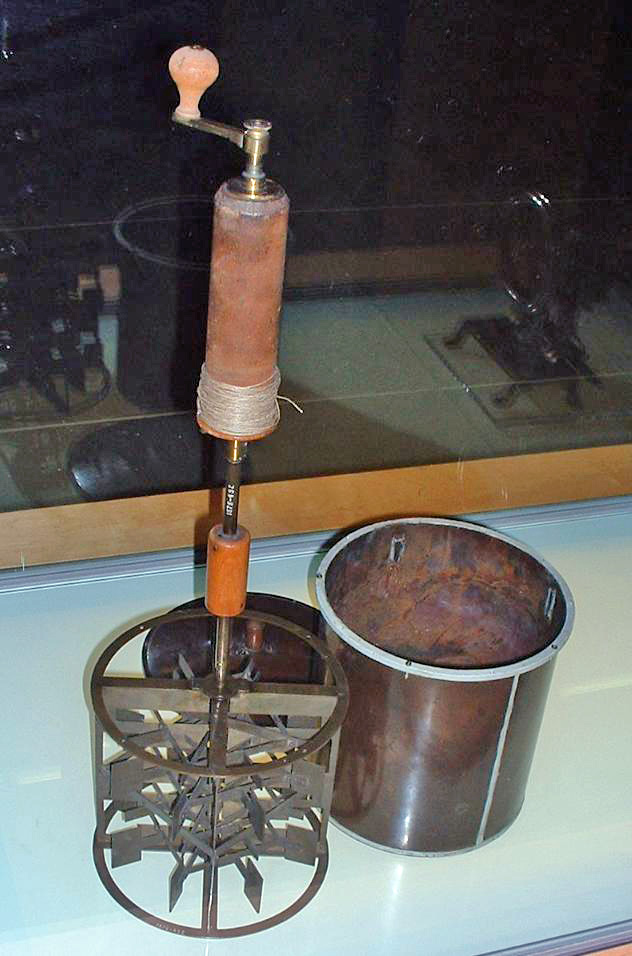
Joule's heat apparatus, 1845

Although the United Kingdom was slow to adopt the metric system domestically, British scientists shaped the measurement systems that became the SI, above all in the 19th century, through work on coherent units, electrical standards and the physics of measurement. That prominence shows in the naming: six of the nineteen SI units named after people honour Britons — newton, farad, joule, watt, kelvin and gray. Their contributions, and those of other British scientists, include:

- 1620 – Edmund Gunter introduces Gunter's chain, with its decimal division into 100 links
- 1783 – James Watt calls for a global decimal measurement system
- 1845 – James Prescott Joule demonstrates the equivalence of mechanical and thermal energy, later reflected in the joule
- 1848 – William Thomson, later Lord Kelvin, proposes an absolute thermometric scale, the precursor of the modern kelvin temperature scale
- 1861–1863 – A BAAS committee including Thomson, James Clerk Maxwell and Joule sets out the concept of a coherent system of base and derived units
- 1873 – The BAAS recommends the centimetre–gram–second system and names the dyne and erg
- 1882 – Johnson, Matthey & Co manufactures standard metres and kilograms for the Metre Convention signatories
- 1884 – The United Kingdom accedes to the Metre Convention
- 1975 – Bryan Kibble of the National Physical Laboratory devises the watt balance, later renamed the Kibble balance
- 2019 – The 2019 revision of the SI redefines the kilogram using the Planck constant, measured with Kibble balances

== Advocacy groups ==
A number of advocacy groups exist to promote either the metric or the imperial system. The groups include:

- Active Resistance to Metrication, founded by the Eurosceptic politician Tony Bennett, which campaigns against metrication and whose members have removed metric traffic signs.
- The British Weights and Measures Association campaigns for the retention of imperial measurements in the United Kingdom.
- The Metric Martyrs, formed by individuals who engaged in civil disobedience by selling loose produce using imperial measures instead of metric, campaigns for the freedom to sell goods in any chosen measurement system.
- The UK Metric Association campaigns for the complete replacement of the imperial measurement system with the metric system in the United Kingdom.

== See also ==
- History of the metric system
- Metre Convention
- Metrication
- Metrication opposition
- Conversion of units
- Language reform
- Preferred numbers
- Spread of the Latin script
- Decimalisation

== Bibliography ==
- Grierson, Philip (1972). English Linear Measures: an essay in origins. The Stenton Lecture 1971. University of Reading.
- McGreevy, Thomas (1995). The Basis of Measurement: Historical Aspects. Chippenham: Picton Publishing. ISBN 0-948251-82-4.
- Seymour, W. A., ed. (1980). A History of the Ordnance Survey. Folkestone: Dawson. ISBN 0-7129-0979-6.
