= Stone (unit) =

Imperial unit of mass equal to 14 pounds

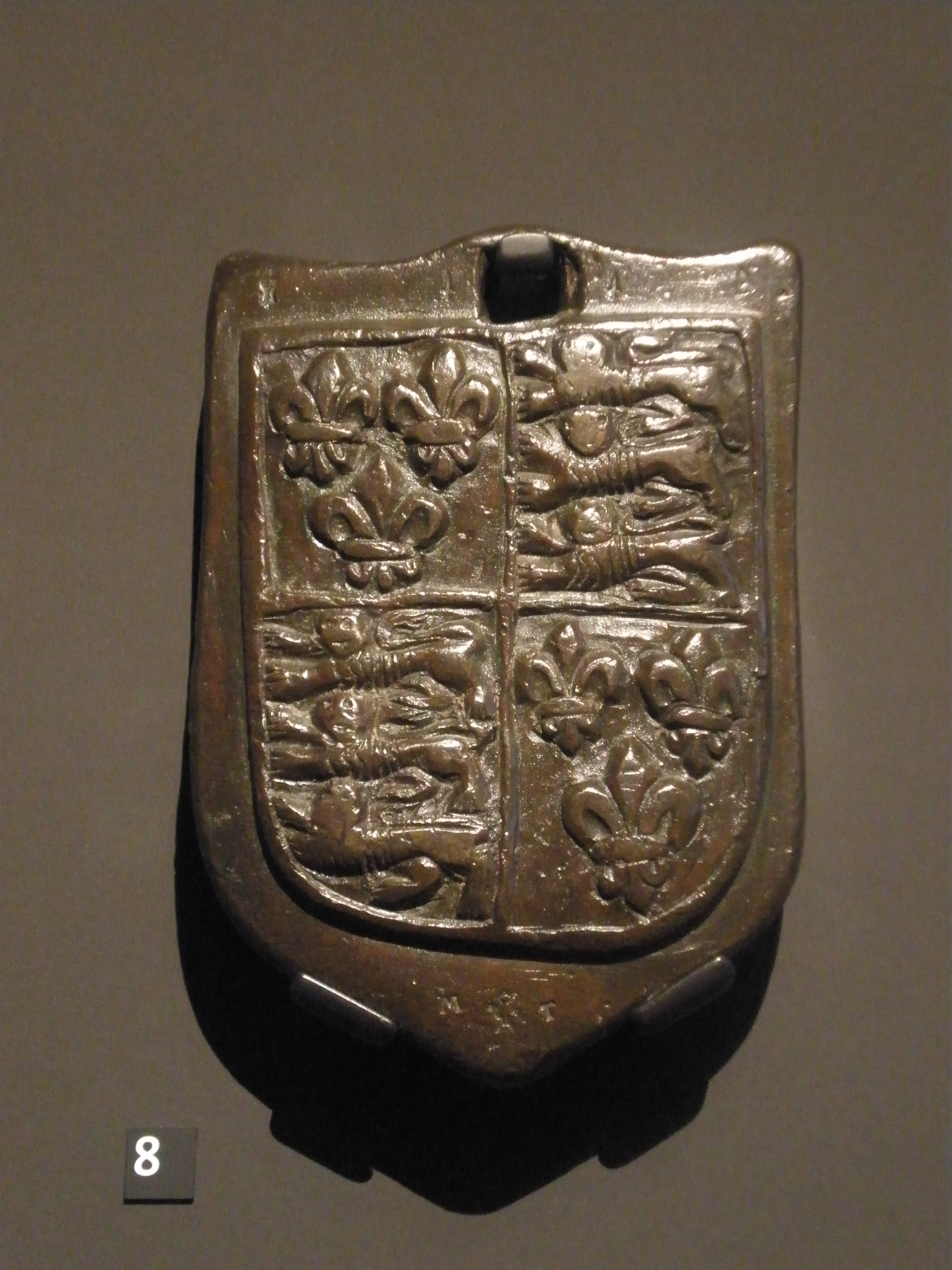
- A 16th-century bronze 1-stone weight emblazoned with the English coat of arms

General information
- Unit system: British imperial
- Unit of: Mass
- Abbreviation: st

The stone or stone weight (abbreviation: st.) is an English and British imperial unit of mass equal to 14 avoirdupois pounds (≈6.35 kg). (Note: Per the 1959 International Yard and Pound Agreement, adopted by the United Kingdom in 1963. Prior to that agreement, various minor differences existed between national standards and their conversions to the metric system.) The stone continues in customary use in the United Kingdom and Ireland for body weight.

England and other Germanic-speaking countries of Northern Europe formerly used various standardised "stones" for trade, with their values ranging from about 5 to 40 local pounds (2.3 to 18.1 kg) depending on the location and objects weighed. With the advent of metrication, Europe's various "stones" were superseded by or adapted to the kilogram from the mid-19th century onward.

== Antiquity ==
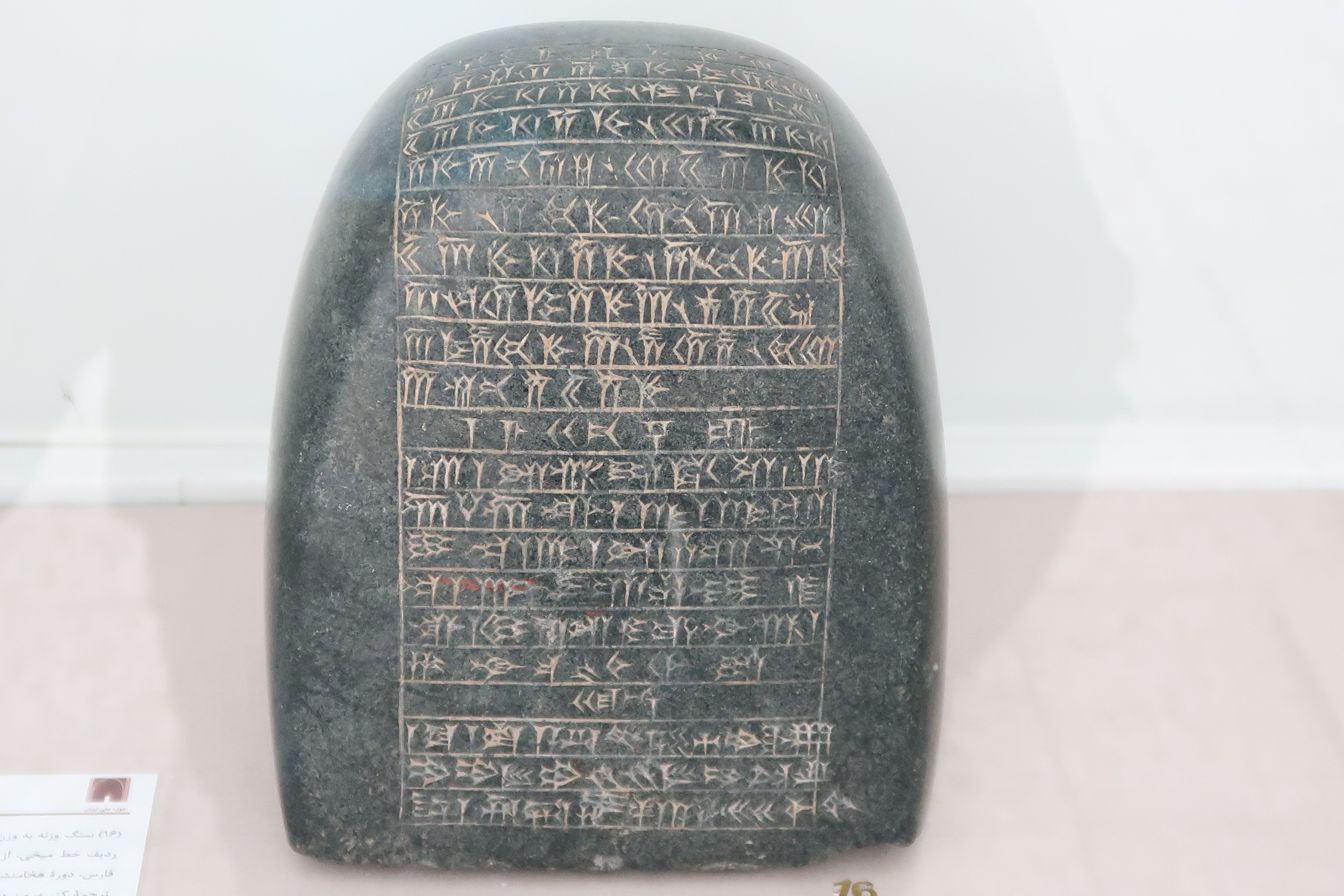
Stone weight with Darius the Great–era tri-lingual inscription. 9,950g

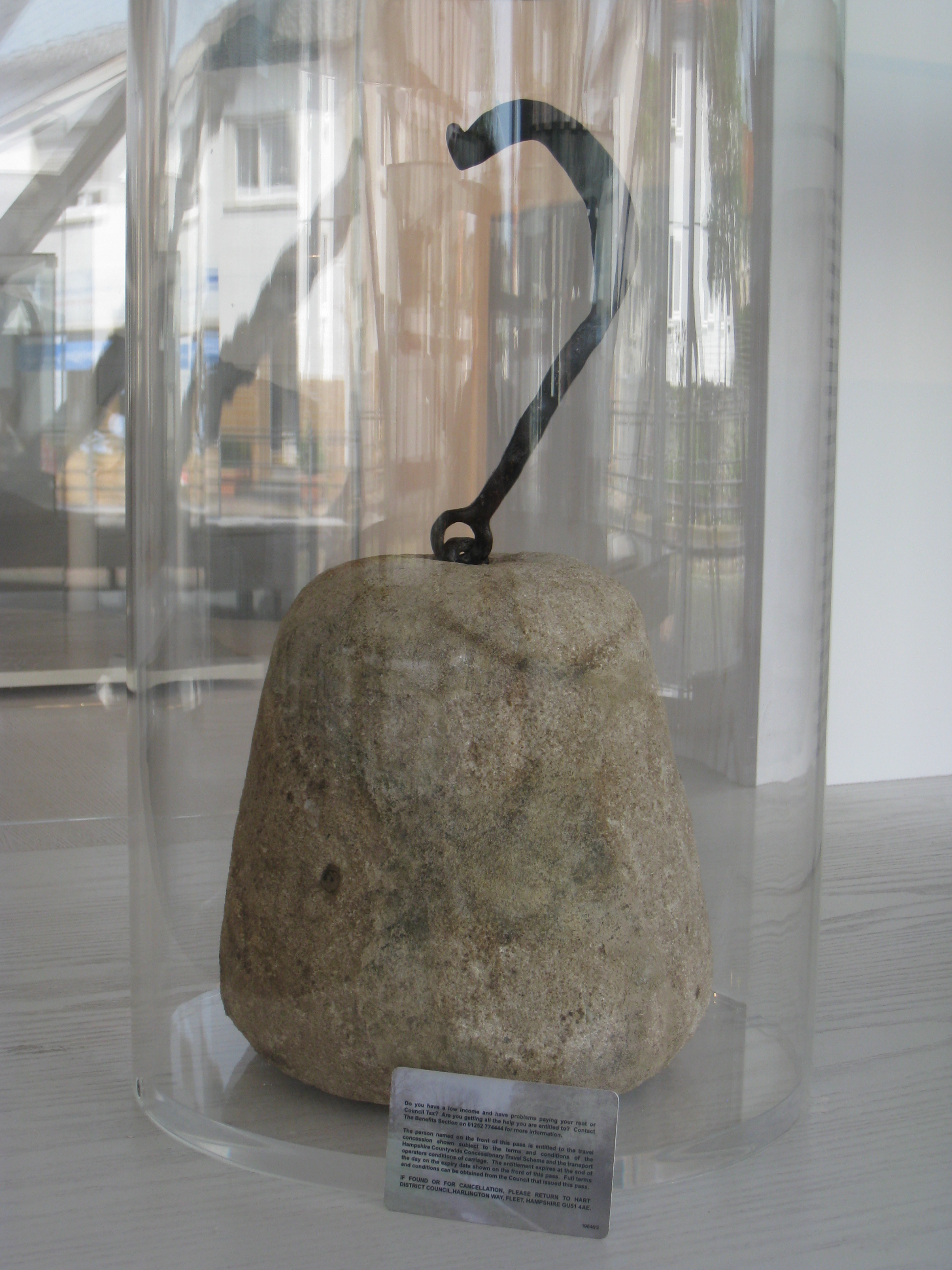
The Eschborn Museum's 2nd-century stone weight of 40 Roman pounds (c. 13 kg), beside an ID-1-sized card for scale

The name "stone" derives from the historical use of stones for weights, a practice that dates back into antiquity. The Biblical law against the carrying of "diverse weights, a large and a small" is more literally translated as "you shall not carry a stone and a stone (אבן ואבן), a large and a small". There was no standardised "stone" in the ancient Jewish world, but in Roman times stone weights were crafted to multiples of the Roman pound. Such weights varied in quality: the Yale Medical Library holds 10- and 50-pound examples of polished serpentine, while a 40-pound example at the Eschborn Museum is made of sandstone.

== Great Britain and Ireland ==
The 1772 edition of the Encyclopædia Britannica defined the stone:

STONE also denotes a certain quantity or weight of some commodities. A stone of beef, in London, is the quantity of eight pounds; in Hertfordshire, twelve pounds; in Scotland sixteen pounds.

The Weights and Measures Act 1824 (5 Geo. 4. c. 74), which applied to all of the United Kingdom of Great Britain and Ireland, consolidated the weights and measures legislation of several centuries into a single document. It revoked the provision that bales of wool should be made up of 20 stones, each of 14 pounds, but made no provision for the continued use of the stone. Ten years later, a stone still varied from 5 pounds (glass) to 8 pounds (meat and fish) to 14 pounds (wool and "horseman's weight"). The Weights and Measures Act 1835 permitted using a stone of 14 pounds for trade but other values remained in use. James Britten, in 1880 for example, catalogued a number of different values of the stone in various British towns and cities, ranging from 4 lb to 26 lb. The value of the stone and associated units of measure that were legalised for purposes of trade were clarified by the Weights and Measures Act 1835 as follows:

Equivalent in pounds	Name of unit	Equivalent in stone	Approx. equivalent in kg
1	pound	1/14	0.4536
14	1 stone	1	6.350
28	1 quarter	2	12.70
112	1 hundredweight	8	50.80
2,240	1 long ton	160	1,016

=== England ===
The English stone under law varied by commodity and in practice varied according to local standards. The Assize of Weights and Measures, a statute of uncertain date from c. 1300, describes stones of 5 merchants' pounds used for glass; stones of 8 lb. used for beeswax, sugar, pepper, alum, cumin, almonds, cinnamon, and nutmegs; stones of 12 lb. used for lead; and the London stone of 12 1/2 lb. used for wool. In 1350 Edward III issued a new statute defining the stone weight, to be used for wool and "other Merchandizes", at 14 pounds, (Note: "that every Person do sell and buy by the Balance, so that the Balance be even, and the Woolls and other Merchandizes evenly weighed by the right Weight, so that the Sack of Wooll weigh no more but 26 Stones, and every Stone to weigh 14 l. [pounds] and that the Beam of the Balance do not bow more to the one Part than to the other; (3) and that the Weight be according to the Standard of the Exchequer. (4) And if any Buyer do the contrary, he shall be grievously punished, as well at the Suit of the Party, as at the Suit of our Lord the King.") reaffirmed by Henry VII in 1495.

A nineteenth-century slide rule for estimating cattle carcass weights, calibrated in stones of 20, 17 1/2, 8 and 14 pounds

In England, merchants traditionally sold potatoes in half-stone increments of 7 pounds. Live animals were weighed in stones of 14 lb; but, once slaughtered, their carcasses were weighed in stones of 8 lb. Thus, if the animal's carcass accounted for 8/14 of the animal's weight, the butcher could return the dressed carcasses to the animal's owner stone for stone, keeping the offal, blood and hide as his due for slaughtering and dressing the animal. Smithfield market continued to use the 8 lb stone for meat until shortly before the Second World War. The Oxford English Dictionary also lists:

Commodity	Number of pounds
Wool	14, 15, 24
Wax	12
Sugar and spice	8
Beef and mutton	8

=== Scotland ===
The Scottish stone was equal to 16 Scottish pounds (17 lb 8 oz avoirdupois or 7.936 kg). In 1661, the Royal Commission of Scotland recommended that the Troy stone be used as a standard of weight and that it be kept in the custody of the burgh of Lanark. The tron (or local) stone of Edinburgh, also standardised in 1661, was 16 tron pounds (22 lb 1 oz avoirdupois or 9.996 kg). In 1789 an encyclopedic enumeration of measurements was printed for the use of "his Majesty's Sheriffs and Stewards Depute, and Justices of Peace, ... and to the Magistrates of the Royal Boroughs of Scotland" and provided a county-by-county and commodity-by-commodity breakdown of values and conversions for the stone and other measures. The Scots stone ceased to be used for trade when the Weights and Measures Act 1824 (5 Geo. 4. c. 74) established a uniform system of measure across the whole of the United Kingdom, which at that time included all of Ireland.

=== Ireland ===
Before the early 19th century, as in England, the stone varied both with locality and with commodity. For example, the Belfast stone for measuring flax equaled 16.75 avoirdupois pounds. The most usual value was 14 pounds. Among the oddities related to the use of the stone was the practice in County Clare of a stone of potatoes being 16 lb in the summer and 18 lb in the winter.

=== Modern use ===
In 1965, the Federation of British Industries informed the British government that its members favoured adopting the metric system. The Board of Trade, on behalf of the government, agreed to support a ten-year metrication programme. There would be minimal legislation, as the programme was to be voluntary and costs were to be borne where they fell. Under the guidance of the Metrication Board, the agricultural product markets achieved a voluntary switchover by 1976. The stone was not included in the Directive 80/181/EEC as a unit of measure that could be used within the EEC for "economic, public health, public safety or administrative purposes", though its use as a "supplementary unit" was permitted. The scope of the directive was extended to include all aspects of the EU internal market from 1 January 2010.

With the adoption of metric units by the agricultural sector, the stone was, in practice, no longer used for trade; and, in the Weights and Measures Act 1985, passed in compliance with EU directive 80/181/EEC, the stone was removed from the list of units permitted for trade in the United Kingdom. In 1983, in response to the same directive, similar legislation was passed in Ireland. The act repealed earlier acts that defined the stone as a unit of measure for trade. (British law had previously been silent regarding other uses of the stone.)

The stone remains widely used in the United Kingdom and Ireland for human body weight: in those countries people may commonly be said to weigh, e.g., "11 stone 4" (11 stones and 4 pounds), rather than "72 kilograms" as in most of the other countries, or "158 pounds", the conventional way of expressing the same weight in the US and in Canada. The invariant plural form of stone in this context is stone (as in, "11 stone" or "12 stone 6 pounds"); in other contexts, the correct plural is stones (as in, "Please enter your weight in stones and pounds"). In Australia and New Zealand, metrication has entirely displaced stones and pounds since the 1970s.

In many sports in both the UK and Ireland, such as professional boxing, wrestling, and horse racing, the stone is used to express body weights.

== Elsewhere ==
The use of the stone in the former British Empire was varied. In Canada for example, it never had a legal status. Shortly after the United States declared independence, Thomas Jefferson, then Secretary of State, presented a report on weights and measures to the U.S. House of Representatives. Even though all the weights and measures in use in the United States at the time were derived from English weights and measures, his report made no mention of the stone being used. He did, however, propose a decimal system of weights in which his "[decimal] pound" would have been 9.375 ounces (265.8 g) and the "[decimal] stone" would have been 5.8595 pounds (2.6578 kg).

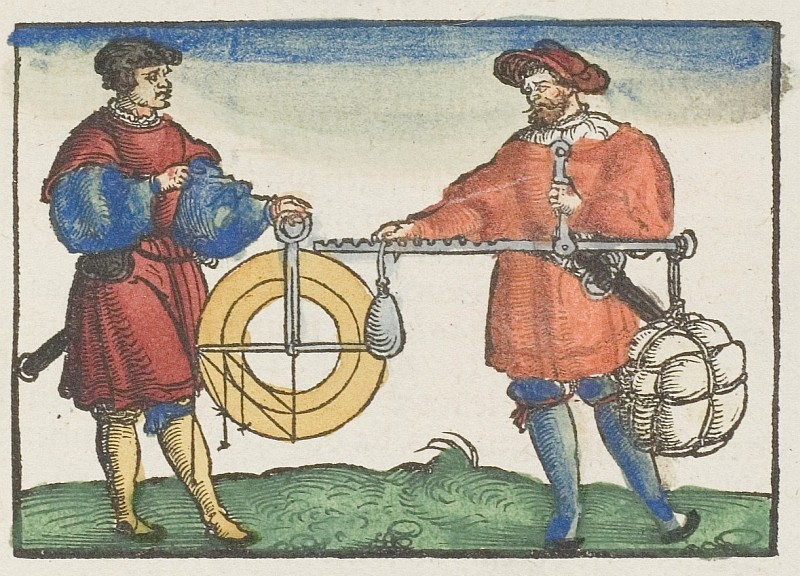
A depiction of a medieval German scale weighing bales of wool according to the local stone.

Before the advent of metrication, units called "stone" (German: Stein; Dutch: steen; Polish: kamień) were used in many northwestern European countries. Its value, usually between 3 and 10 kg, varied from city to city and sometimes from commodity to commodity. The number of local "pounds" in a stone also varied from city to city. During the early 19th century, states such as the Netherlands (including Belgium) and the South Western German states, which had redefined their system of measures using the kilogramme des Archives as a reference for weight (mass), also redefined their stone to align it with the kilogram.

This table shows a selection of stones from various northern European cities:

City	Modern country	Term used	Weight of stone in kilograms	Weight of stone in local pounds	Comments
Dresden	Germany	Stein	10.15	22	Before 1841
Dresden	Germany	Stein	10.0	20	From 1841 onwards
Mecklenburg-Strelitz; Berlin	Germany	schwerer Stein	10.296	22	heavy stone
Mecklenburg-Strelitz; Berlin	Germany	leichter Stein	5.148	11	light stone
Danzig (Gdańsk); Königsberg (Kaliningrad)	Poland; Russia	großer Stein	15.444	33	large stone
Danzig (Gdańsk); Königsberg (Kaliningrad)	Poland; Russia	kleiner Stein	10.296	22	small stone
Bremen	Germany	Stein Flachs	9.97	20	stone of flax
Bremen	Germany	Stein Wolle und Federn	4.985	10	stone of wool and feathers
Oldenburg	Germany	Stein Flachs	9.692	20	stone of flax
Oldenburg	Germany	Stein Wolle und Federn	4.846	10	stone of wool and feathers
Kraków	Poland	Stein	10.137	25	
Osnabrück	Germany	Stein	4.941	10	
Amsterdam	Netherlands	steen	3.953	8	Before 1817
Amsterdam	Netherlands	steen	3	6	"Metric stone" (after 1817)
Karlsruhe	Germany	Stein	5.00	10	
Leipzig; Weimar	Germany	Stein	10.287	22	
Breslau (Wrocław)	Poland	Stein	9.732	24	
Antwerp	Belgium	steen	3.761	8	
Prague	Czech Republic	kámen/Stein	10.29	20	
Solothurn	Switzerland	Stein	5.184	10	
Stockholm	Sweden	sten	13.60	32	(32 Skålpund)
Warsaw	Poland	kamień	10.14	25	
Vilnius	Lithuania	kamieni	14.992	40	
Vienna	Austria	Stein	11.20	20	

== Metric stone ==
In the Netherlands, where the metric system was adopted in 1817, the pond (pound) was set equal to half a kilogram, and the steen (stone), which had previously been 8 Amsterdam pond (3.953 kg), was redefined as being 3 kg. In modern colloquial Dutch, a pond is used as an alternative for 500 grams or half a kilogram, while the ons is used for a weight of 100 grams, being 1/5 pond.

== See also ==
- English, imperial, and German units of measurement
- Sack, a unit of wool equal to 28 stone
