= Thoburn v Sunderland City Council =

English Court of Appeals case, noted for the suggestion of implied repeal

- Court: Divisional court, Queen's Bench Division
- Full case name: Steve Thoburn v Sunderland City Council; Colin Hunt v London Borough of Hackney; Julian Harman and John Dove v Cornwall County Council; Peter Collins v London Borough of Sutton
- Decided: 18 February 2002
- Citations: [2002] EWHC 195 (Admin), [2003] QB 151, [2002] 3 WLR 247, [2002] 4 All ER 156, The Times, 22 February 2002

Case history
- Prior action: R v Thoburn [2001] Eu LR 587
- Subsequent action: None

Court membership
- Judges sitting: Laws LJ and Crane J

Keywords
- constitutional law; delegated legislation; directives; European Union law; weights and measures

Thoburn v Sunderland City Council (also known as the "Metric Martyrs case") is a UK constitutional and administrative law case, concerning the interaction of EU law and an Act of Parliament. It is important for its recognition of the supremacy of EU law and the basis for that recognition. Though the earlier Factortame had also referred to Parliament's voluntary acceptance of the supremacy of EU law, Thoburn put less stress on the jurisprudence of the ECJ and more on the domestic acceptance of such supremacy; Lord Justice Laws suggested there was a hierarchy of "constitutional statutes" that Parliament could only expressly repeal, and so were immune from implied repeal.

== Facts ==
The Weights and Measures Act 1985 section 1 provided that both the pound and the kilogram are equally legal units of measurement in the United Kingdom. In 1994, several statutory instruments came into force bringing the United Kingdom into compliance with Directive 80/181/EEC, which aimed to harmonise the use in the European Community of units of measurement. Amongst the measures enacted were the Weights and Measures Act 1985 (Metrication) (Amendment) Order 1994 and the Units of Measurement Regulations 1994. Without modifying the basic principle in Section 1 of the 1985 Act that the pound and the kilogram enjoyed parity, the Order specified that the use of the pound as a primary indicator of measurement for trade would be illegal after 1 January 2000 and would be a criminal offence under Section 8 of the 1985 Act. The 1994 Regulations permitted the continued display of imperial measures until the end of 1999, as long as the metric equivalent was also displayed at least as prominently. The Units of Measures Regulations 1994 was introduced on the basis of Sections 2(2) and (4) of the European Communities Act 1972, which authorised Ministers to pass secondary legislation to bring the UK into closer compliance with its then obligations under EU law.

In March 2001, Steve Thoburn, a greengrocer, was convicted at Sunderland Magistrates' Court for using weighing apparatus that did not comply with the 1985 Act; he had been warned on two occasions that his apparatus was illegal. Also, Colin Hunt sold fruit and vegetables in Hackney, displaying his prices by reference to imperial measures, and was convicted at Thames Magistrates' Court in June 2001. Julian Harman, a greengrocer, and John Dove, a fishmonger, sold their goods by sole reference to imperial measures at Camelford market in Cornwall; they were both convicted in August 2001 at Bodmin Magistrates' Court. Peter Collins sold fruit and vegetables in Sutton and, unlike the other appellants, had not been convicted of an offence. Instead, he was contesting the terms of the market stall licence proposed by the legal authority which required metric measures to be used; Sutton Magistrates' Court had rejected his claim.

== Judgment ==
=== Magistrates' court ===
In the Sunderland Magistrates' Court Judge Bruce Morgan stated:

So long as this country remains a member of the European Union then the laws of this country are subject to the doctrine of the primacy of community law ... The passing of the [European Communities Act] 1972 meant that European legislation became part of our legislation. ... This country ... has joined this European club and by so doing has agreed to be bound by the rules and regulations of the club ...

All five appellants, called the "Metric Martyrs" in the press, contested the decisions against them by way of case stated before a divisional court of the Queen's Bench Division.

=== High Court ===
The appellants argued first that the fact that the kilogram and the pound were recognised as equally legal units – notwithstanding the 1994 modifications – operated as an implied repeal of Section 2(2) of the European Communities Act 1972 in respect of weights and measures regulation. The doctrine of implied repeal means that where provisions of one Act of Parliament are inconsistent or repugnant to the provisions of an earlier Act, the later Act abrogates the inconsistency in the earlier one. In this case, it was argued that by proclaiming the equal status and legality of metric and imperial measures, Parliament had wished to repeal the authorisation contained in the 1972 Act allowing Ministers to adopt secondary legislation in the field of weights and measures to comply with EU law. Consequently, the Weights and Measures Act 1985 (Metrication) (Amendment) Order 1994 and the Units of Measurement Regulations 1994, both adopted on the basis of this authorisation, were now invalid. The Appellants also argued, relying on the persuasive precedent of the Australian High Court case of Goodwin v Phillips (1908), that implied repeal could work pro tanto, that is to say a later act could carve out an exception to the operation of an earlier without prejudice to its operation in areas unaffected by the later statute. They also argued on the basis of authority from the Court of Appeal and divisional courts in the 1930s that a consolidation statute could work an implied repeal in the same way as any other act.

Dealing with the Factortame litigation the appellants argued that as implied repeal applied in those cases but had not been argued by the Attorney-General they were caught by the Rule in Warner's Case (1661) and were not binding authority.

The second argument concerned the nature of the authorisation contained in the European Communities Act 1972, what is known as a Henry VIII clause delegating to the Executive a power to amend primary and secondary legislation to achieve a certain aim. It was argued that the power to modify legislation only extends to legislation passed at the time the authorisation was made, and not future legislation.

The third group of arguments concerned public international law. Basing themselves on the Vienna Convention on the Law of Treaties the appellants argued that (1) the High Contracting Parties to the Treaty of Brussels (by which the United Kingdom joined the European Economic Community) should be fixed with knowledge of the constitutional principle whereby one Parliament could not bind its successors and (2) if the Treaty of Rome had the effect contended for by the respondents the relevant treaty provisions were void for conflict with the over-riding jus cogens principles of the sovereign equality of nations and entitlement to freedom from interference in their internal affairs under the rule whereby treaty provisions in conflict with the jus cogens are void.

For their part, the respondents argued that so long as the United Kingdom is a member of the European Union, the doctrine of Parliamentary sovereignty whereby Parliament is free to create or repeal any law must be disapplied in relation to matters concerning EU law where the principle of supremacy of EU law as expressed in the judgments of the European Court of Justice in Costa v. ENEL and Van Gend en Loos takes precedence.

Giving his judgment, Lord Justice John Laws accepted that the appellants were correct in arguing that the 1985 Act provided for both the Imperial and metric systems to operate side by side. He also accepted that implied repeal could work pro tanto and that the Australian case relied upon by the appellants correctly stated the law of England. He held that the relationship between community and national law had to be judged exclusively by reference to national law.

Laws LJ went on to hold that there was no question of implied repeal as there was no inconsistency between the European Communities Act and the Weights and Measures Act, since there can be no inconsistency between a provision of an Act granting a Henry VIII power and the terms of legislation adopted in application of that power. Furthermore, to say that Henry VIII clauses could only operate vis-a-vis legislation which was already in existence at the time the clause was passed would be to place a limitation on the legislative powers of Parliament and run contrary to the doctrine of Parliamentary sovereignty. Given this primary finding, the Court's observations about how the doctrine of implied repeal might or might not apply to "constitutional statutes" were obiter dicta, albeit potentially significant, given the standing of Laws as a leading public law judge.

Notwithstanding that, the point has not been subject to much judicial elaboration since the Thoburn case. In 2012, in BH v The Lord Advocate (Scotland), Lord Hope said in paragraph [30] of the judgment "the Scotland Act can only be expressly repealed; it cannot be impliedly repealed; that is because of its 'fundamental constitutional nature'."

In disposing of the second argument Laws took the opportunity to outline a constitutional framework within which the competing and seemingly irreconciliable principles of Parliamentary sovereignty and EU supremacy could be accommodated. He began by stating that the exceptions which the common law had in recent years recognised to the doctrine of implied repeal could be explained as forming part of a new class or category of legislative provisions which cannot be repealed by mere implication. There is, in effect, a hierarchy of Acts of Parliament. He stated:

In the present state of its maturity the common law has come to recognise that there exist rights which should properly be classified as constitutional or fundamental ... And from this a further insight follows. We should recognise a hierarchy of Acts of Parliament: as it were "ordinary" statutes and "constitutional" statutes. The two categories must be distinguished on a principled basis. In my opinion a constitutional statute is one which (a) conditions the legal relationship between citizen and State in some general, overarching manner, or (b) enlarges or diminishes the scope of what we would now regard as fundamental constitutional rights. (a) and (b) are of necessity closely related: it is difficult to think of an instance of (a) that is not also an instance of (b).

In this category of "constitutional statutes" Laws identified Magna Carta, the Bill of Rights 1689, the Acts of Union 1707, the Reform Acts, the Human Rights Act 1998, the Scotland Act 1998, the Government of Wales Act 1998 and the European Communities Act 1972. Such statutes are, because of their constitutional importance, to be protected from implied repeal and, whilst not entrenched in English law, can only be repealed by the express intervention of Parliament. Laws wrote that the question of whether the European Communities Act was affected by implied repeal had already been determined by the House of Lords in Factortame. In that case, the Merchant Shipping Act 1988 had arguably impliedly repealed Section 2(2) of the 1972 Act by authorising a discrimination contrary to Community law, but the Law Lords did not regard the 1988 Act as having had that effect.

Having outlined the constitutional framework, Laws proceeded to apply it to establish the nature of the relationship between EU and English law. In his judgment, the correct analysis of this relationship requires four propositions:

1. Specific rights and obligations created by EU law are by virtue of the European Communities Act incorporated into national law and rank supreme over national law. Where there is an inconsistency between an EU law right or obligation and national law, the latter must be modified or abrogated, even where it is contained in an Act of Parliament.
2. The European Communities Act is a constitutional statute and, as such, cannot be impliedly repealed.
3. The category of constitutional statutes is derived from English law and not EU law.
4. The legal basis of the United Kingdom's relationship with the EU rests on national law provisions and not EU law. Where an EU measure was seen to be contrary to a fundamental or constitutional right guaranteed by English law, there would be a question as to whether the European Communities Act was sufficient to incorporate the measure into national law.

=== Attempts to appeal further ===
The Appellants sought permission to appeal to the House of Lords, a certificate having been granted by the divisional court that the case raised an issue of general application and public importance, but leave to appeal was refused by the House of Lords after an oral hearing on grounds that they did not consider that the appeal would "give rise to points capable of reasonable argument".

After the House of Lords rejected the application for permission to appeal, the Appeal sought to petition the European Court of Human Rights on the grounds that the judgment in the House of Lords was a breach of Article 6 of the European Convention on Human Rights (fair trial). On 12 February 2004, a committee of three ECHR judges unanimously ruled that the application was inadmissible. The reason for their ruling was:

In the light of all the material in its possession, and in so far as the matters complained of were within its competence, the Court found that they did not disclose any appearance of a violation of the rights and freedoms set out in the convention or its protocols.

== Aftermath ==
In the event, because of later changes in EU and UK legislation, it continued to be lawful for traders to use imperial measures as "supplementary indications" alongside the required "primary" metric measures even after the end of 2009.

== See also ==
- EU law
- Implied repeal
- Metric Martyrs
- R (HS2 Action Alliance Ltd) v Secretary of State for Transport
- UK administrative law
