= European units of measurement directives =

Directive 71/354/EEC
- European Union directive
- Title: Units of Measure Directive
- Made by: European Council
- Made under: Art. 100
- Journal reference: N C 78, 2 February 1971, P 53

History
- Date made: 18 October 1971
- Entry into force: 18 April 1973

Other legislation
- Replaced by: 80/181/EEC

Directive 80/181/EEC
- European Union directive
- Title: Units of Measure Directive
- Made by: European Council
- Made under: Art. 100
- Journal reference: L39, 15 February 1980, p. 40–50

History
- Date made: 20 December 1979
- Entry into force: 21 December 1979

Other legislation
- Amended by: see text

As of 2009, the European Union had issued two units of measurement directives. In 1971, it issued Directive 71/354/EEC, which required EU member states to standardise on the International System of Units (SI) rather than use a variety of CGS and MKS units then in use. The second, which replaced the first, was Directive 80/181/EEC, enacted in 1979 and later amended several times (in 1984, 1989, 2000 and 2009), which issued a number of derogations to the United Kingdom and Ireland based on the former directive.

== Directive 71/354/EEC ==
When the first units of measurement directive was issued, the six members of the EEC had been using the metric system for a hundred years or more. During that time the metric system had undergone a number of changes, particularly in science and engineering. Some industries were based on the CGS variant of the metric system and other on the MKS variant. In 1960, the CGPM published the International System of Units (SI), a coherent version of the metric system based on the MKS variant. Directive 71/354/EEC sought to rationalise the system of units within the EEC by standardising on SI.

The directive catalogued the units of measure that were permitted for measuring instruments (for instance scales), measurements and indications of quantity expressed in units for economic, public health, public safety and administrative purposes. The catalogue was consistent with the SI standard. The directive explicitly proscribed a number of mainly CGS units of measure that were not to be used after 31 December 1977.

The directive explicitly exempted member states from having to use those units of measure in the catalogue in situations where other units of measure had been laid down by international intergovernmental conventions or agreements in the field of air and sea transport and rail traffic.

Denmark, Ireland and the United Kingdom joined the EEC in 1973. The directive had little impact in Denmark which was in a similar situation to the other EEC member vis-à-vis the use of metric units. Ireland and the United Kingdom were in the process of metrication programmes and the directive was consistent with those countries' policies as they stood at the time. The three new member states had five years to implement this directive (as well as all other directives that had been enacted by the EEC).

== Directive 80/181/EEC ==
By the late 1970s, the metrication programme in the United Kingdom had lost momentum. In particular, the government had decided to postpone the metrication of road signs. Furthermore, the metrication of trade in many consumer areas had not been completed. The United Kingdom asked the EEC for a derogation to permit the continued use of imperial units. The result was a repeal of Directive 71/354/EEC and its replacement by Directive 80/181/EEC. The principal changes were:

- A number of units that had been proscribed under Directive 71/354/EEC could continue to be used until the end of 1985.
- A number of imperial units including the pound, ounce, yard, foot, inch, gallon and pint could continue to be used until the end of 1989.
- Until a date to be determined by the states in question:
  - The mile, yard, foot and inch could be used on road traffic signs, distance and speed measurement.
  - Pints could be used for the sale of milk in returnable containers and for the measurement of draught beer and cider.
  - Acres could be used for purposes of land registration and troy ounces could be used when dealing with precious metals.
- Supplementary units were permitted until the end of 1989.

=== Amendments ===
- Directive 85/1/EEC of 18 December 1984 was a technical amendment to reflect the change in the definition of the metre and included other minor changes to the catalogue of allowable units.
- Directive 89/617/EEC of 27 November 1989 changed the cutoff dates for supplementary units to 31 December 1999 and cutoff dates for those imperial units that were previously allowed were extended to 31 December 1994 for some units and to 31 December 1999 for other units.
- Directive 1999/103/EC of 24 January 2000 included minor changes to the catalogue of allowable units. The cutoff date for the use of supplementary units was extended to 31 December 2009.
- Directive 2009/3/EC of 11 March 2009: In 2006 it became apparent that the 2009 cut-off for the use of supplementary units could cause problems in US-EU trade. The EU Commission published a consultation document and on the basis of responses received proposed modifications of Directive 80/181/EEC which would continue the current practice by:
  - Permitting indefinitely the use of supplementary indications. This will ensure a continued application of the current practice and will allow continuing flexibility as regards nonmetric units when no metric units exist, e.g. binary measurements in computing (bits, bytes).
  - Including the new SI unit for catalytic activity (the "katal"), adopted by the General Conference on Weights and Measures.
  - Allowing the United Kingdom and Ireland to continue the limited exemptions concerning specified uses of the pint, mile and the troy ounce, considering absence of impact of these exemptions on cross border trade and the principle of subsidiarity; whilst repealing the exemption for the use of acre for land registration which is no longer applied.
  - Clarifying the scope of the Directive to be fully in line with the existing Treaties by no longer mentioning specific fields to which the Directive is applicable

These amendments were published on 7 May 2009 and became effective on 1 January 2010.

== Public reactions ==
=== Protests in the United Kingdom ===
The directive, or more precisely the British legislation amended to implement the directive, was the subject of considerable controversy in the United Kingdom. In particular, some food sellers refused to comply, selling vegetable by the pound without a metric equivalent. Others used only non-metric scales or sold beer or cider by the litre and half-litre, even though the law required the use of pints. Some were convicted of offences under weights and measures legislation and became known as the "Metric Martyrs".

=== Reactions in the United States ===
In spite of the extension till 2009, the provisions of this directive, in particular the provisions prohibiting dual labelling, were a cause of serious concern in the United States. In 2005 there were informal consultations between the US and the EU. In 2006, the US Department of Commerce made US companies aware of potential problems and lobbied for a further extension of dual labelling, which would be more consistent with United States legislation, in particular the Federal Fair Packaging and Labeling Act.

=== Consultations in 2007 ===
In the light of the impending termination of the acceptance of non-metric units as supplementary units in 2009 and in view of the extension of the SI system at an international level (especially in the United States), the European Commission decided in 2007 to consider amendments to the directive and initiated consultations with interested parties, including the United States government. The United States raised serious concerns concerning mutual trade and incompatibility with US legislation, such as the Fair Packaging and Labeling Act. There was also concern as to how the directive would be interpreted. Other organisations also voiced criticisms. Many organisation, such as the AeA (formerly the American Electronics Association) advocated a continuation of "dual labelling". Eurosceptic groups in the UK, such as the United Kingdom Independence Party also expressed concern. Other US trade organisations pointed to incompatibilities with US legislation and noted that the directive applies not just to labelling but also to advertising, instruction manuals, etc. The report on the consultations lists other problems in the United States.

Many different groups and individuals contributed to the consultations on amendments to the directive carried out in 2007. The majority of private individuals who responded were in favour of ending the use of supplementary indications. However, without exception the European and American industry federations and individual firms who responded were in favour of retaining supplementary indications for another ten years or indefinitely. They pointed to conflicting federal law in the United States that would have necessitated relabelling. All member states who responded were also in favour of extending supplementary indications.

=== Response to the European Commission proposal ===
The proposal met with measured approval by advocacy groups that had opposed the legislation. The Commission proposal was also welcomed, even before it was officially published, by metrication advocates in the United States, who hoped that it would help promote the cause of metrication in the United States.

== See also ==
- Thoburn v Sunderland City Council
- Metrication in the United Kingdom
- Metrication in the United States
