= Metric Martyrs =

British advocacy group campaigning for the freedom in units of measure used in trade

The Metric Martyrs were a British advocacy group who campaigned for the freedom to choose what units of measurement are used by traders. The group believed that vendors should have the freedom to mark their goods with imperial weights and measurements alone, without a metric indication.

The advocacy group was formed by individuals who had been accused of offences related to selling loose produce using imperial measures, including not displaying metric signage. Some had also used weighing machines whose calibration stamps had been removed by trading standards officers, because the scales could not weigh in metric and so were no longer certified for commercial use. Newspapers dubbed the group the "metric martyrs" after Chris Howell, then weights and measures spokesman for the Institute of Trading Standards Administration (today the Trading Standards Institute), said that they could martyr themselves if they wanted to.

== Legal cases ==
In 2001 Steve Thoburn, a greengrocer in Sunderland and the lead defendant, was convicted of two offences under the Weights and Measures Act 1985 of using weighing equipment that was not stamped by a Weights and Measures Inspector. The stamps had been obliterated because the scales were not capable of weighing in the metric system as well as imperial, and hence were no longer permitted for commercial use. He was initially convicted and given a six-month conditional discharge.

Thoburn, together with the other traders convicted in their own local cases, appealed to the divisional court in the combined case of Thoburn v Sunderland City Council. Their argument was that the Weights and Measures Act 1985, by making the pound and the kilogram equally lawful primary units, had impliedly repealed section 2(2) of the European Communities Act 1972 — the provision under which the metric regulations they were prosecuted for breaching had themselves been made. If that argument had succeeded, the regulations would have had no lawful basis and the convictions could not stand.

The court, presided over by Laws LJ, rejected the argument and upheld the convictions. In doing so, Laws LJ held that the European Communities Act 1972 was a "constitutional statute" of a kind that could not be impliedly repealed by a later, ordinary Act such as the 1985 Act — only by express words. The ruling, though it turned on a case about market-stall scales, is regarded as a significant statement on the hierarchy of statutes in English constitutional law.

A petition for leave to appeal to the House of Lords was refused, as was a subsequent application by Thoburn to the European Court of Human Rights alleging a breach of the right to a fair trial.

Thoburn died of a heart attack in March 2004.

Colin Hunt, who runs a fruit and veg stall in Hackney, was convicted in 2001 of six offences under the Price Marking Order 1999 for failing to display a unit price per kilogram.

John Dove, a fishmonger, and Julian Harman, a greengrocer, were also convicted in Cornwall in 2001 of two offences under the Price Marking Order 1999 of failing to display a unit price per kilogram, and of two offences of using a scale that was only capable of weighing in the imperial system.

Peter Collins, a fruit seller in Sutton who was prosecuted in 2000, was not convicted of any criminal offence. He instead appealed to a magistrates' court against the conditions attached to his street trading licence, which — as with all such licences — required that imperial quantities be labelled no less prominently than the corresponding metric quantity.

=== A converse case: Nic Davison ===
Unlike the other cases here, which concerned traders wanting to use imperial units only, a 2008 case involved the opposite: a trader penalised for using metric units where imperial was legally required. Nic Davison was served with an infringement notice for selling draught beer by the litre rather than the pint, at his Polish restaurant in Doncaster — draught beer and cider being one of the few goods that UK law requires to be sold in imperial units. Trading Standards officers threatened Davison with prosecution and called on him to change the glasses used in his restaurant. Davison refused, arguing that EU law took precedence over the UK pint requirement. The case against him was dropped. Davison had sought the help of then Prime Minister Gordon Brown and of his MP Ed Miliband.

== Pardon campaign ==
UK regulations drawn up in response to EEC/EU weights and measures directives had required the use of metric units for certain activities, including sale by weight or measure in the retail trade of certain produce. Prior to 1 January 2000, these regulations applied to most pre-packaged food (Note: The only exception for pre-packaged food was milk sold in returnable containers.) but on that date, they were extended to cover selling transactions where the product was weighed in front of the customer. (Note: The extension covered loose produce sold by weight or measure except draught beer and cider.) The regulations permitted the equivalent imperial unit to be displayed alongside the metric unit as a "supplementary indicator". In 2007 the European Commission announced that for the cases where metric units were required, it had extended the option to also use imperial units indefinitely. These changes followed from public pressure, and concerns that phasing out dual-labelling would create a trade barrier with the United States, where dual-labelling is required.

In response to the European Commission's announcement, there have been calls for a posthumous pardon for Steve Thoburn, who died after having his petition to the European Court of Human Rights denied. Despite an early day motion by Philip Davies MP, the pardon was denied on the grounds that an offence had been committed under the law which was in force at the time. The 2007 EU announcement was not about a change to existing (2001) legal requirements, but rather abandoned plans for a change in 2009. Moreover, the Office for Criminal Justice Reform claimed that even if the law were to be changed, there would still be no case for a pardon "as citizens are expected to comply with the law as it is at the time".

== Regulation and units of measure ==
In the original case, several statutes were cited including Magna Carta, the Acts of Union 1707 and the European Communities Act 1972.

Since medieval times, The Crown has asserted the right to regulate weights and measures in the market place. Even though the barons forced King John to accept Magna Carta in 1215, it was issued in the name of the king. Article 35 stated:

Let there be one measure for wine throughout our kingdom, and one measure for ale, and one measure for corn, namely "the London quarter"; and one width for cloths whether dyed, russet or halberget, namely two ells within the selvedges. Let it be the same with weights as with measures.

Prior to England and Scotland uniting in 1707, each kingdom enforced their own system of weights and measures. Article 17 of the Act of Union ensured that there was a single system of weights and measures across the newly created United Kingdom by requiring that both nations adopted the English system.

The concept of a single system of measures under government control continues. In 2003 the summary of a government report stated:

To maintain the confidence of consumers and businesses in weights and measures the Government regulates the units and standards of measurement for trade; the design and use of weighing and measuring equipment; the provision of quantity information; and the sale of goods by quantity.

== See also ==
- Directive 80/181/EEC
- Metrication in the United Kingdom
- Metrication opposition
- Thoburn v Sunderland City Council
