= Fair Packaging and Labeling Act =

U.S. law that applies to labels on many consumer products

- Long title: To regulate interstate and foreign commerce by preventing the use of unfair or deceptive methods of packaging or labeling of certain consumer commodities distributed in such commerce, and for other purposes.
- Acronyms (colloquial): FPLA
- Enacted by: the 89th United States Congress
- Effective: November 3, 1966

Citations
- Public law: 89-755
- Statutes at Large: 80 Stat. 1296

Codification
- Acts amended: Federal Food, Drug and Cosmetic Act
- Titles amended: 15 U.S.C.: Commerce and Trade; 21 U.S.C.: Food and Drugs
- U.S.C. sections created: 15 U.S.C. ch. 39 § 1451 et seq.
- U.S.C. sections amended: 21 U.S.C. ch. 9 §§ 301, 321, 331-337

Legislative history
- Introduced in the Senate as S. 985 by Philip Hart (D–MI) on June 9, 1966; Committee consideration by Committee on Energy and Commerce; Passed the Senate on June 9, 1966 (72-9); Passed the House on October 3, 1966 (300-8) with amendment; Senate agreed to House amendment on October 17, 1966 (Cleared) with further amendment; House agreed to Senate amendment on October 17, 1966 (242-6); Signed into law by President Lyndon B. Johnson on November 3, 1966

The Fair Packaging and Labeling Act is a U.S. law that applies to labels on many consumer products. It requires the label to state:

- The identity of the product;
- The name and place of business of the manufacturer, packer, or distributor; and
- The net quantity of contents.

The contents statement must include both metric and U.S. customary units.

Passed under Lyndon B. Johnson in 1966, the law first took effect on July 1, 1967. The metric labeling requirement was added in 1992 and took effect on February 14, 1994. The law is codified as 15 U.S.C. §§ 1451–1461.

There has been an effort by industry threatened by a European Union directive that would force metric-only labeling starting January 1, 2010, to amend the FPLA to allow manufacturers to use metric-only labeling. An amendment to indefinitely delay metric-only labeling was adopted by the European Commission September 10, 2007, approved by the European Parliament November 29, 2007, and by the European Economic and Social Committee December 12, 2007.

== Background of the Fair Packaging and Labeling Act ==
The introduction to Act states that "Informed consumers are essential to the fair and efficient functioning of a free market economy." Here, Congress makes it clear that they are invested in making sure that American shoppers are knowledgeable about the products that they are purchasing in American stores. Senator Philip Hart (D-MI) introduced the Act in the Senate by stating, "The consumer has a right to be able to find out what he is buying, how much he is buying, what it is costing on a per unit basis." Senator Hart earned the nickname "The Conscience of the Senate" from his peers for his tendency to stand up for the average person, defending their rights, and take on big business. Senator Hart worked hard on this bill, he was a strong driving force behind the bill, and he likely knew more about the act than anyone.

The issue of misleading labels and packages had been one ongoing problem as, "Individual consumers have complained for years about confusing labels, shoddy workmanship, dresses that fall apart at the seams, deceptive packaging, "cents off" promotions, high-interest rates." These frustrated consumers sent thousands of letters to Congress requesting solutions. One reason for why this popular discussion emerged at this time was Americans could choose among an unprecedented assortment of products when they went shopping. In the average supermarket in the mid-1960s, a consumer would find 8,000 items, which was more than five times the 1,500 items they found in that same market just 20 years previously.

Before this Act was passed, measurements regarding quantity of goods were not required on packages, there was also no standards in place assuring that similar products had equivalent weights, and there were no regulations in place pledging that packages had a consistent amount of product every time. An investigation was done by the Senate committee that discovered that the manufacturers of potato chips sent them to market in a variation of 73 different weights under 3 pounds." President Johnson voiced his opinion several times on the issue, discussing a common problem, "The housewife often needs a scale, a yardstick and a slide rule to make a rational choice. She has enough to do without performing mathematics in the stores." It was hard to know just how much of an ingredient was needed for a recipe, for example. President Johnson also proclaims, "The Government must do its share to ensure the shopper against deception, to remedy confusion, and to eliminate questionable practices." Johnson was a strong supporter of this act and he believed that it was the government's responsibility to do something to help the American consumer.

== Legislative History ==
The Fair Packaging and Labeling Act was originally introduced in the House on January 3, 1961. The bill lost momentum but was eventually re-introduced into the Senate on February 3, 1965 and it was debated in the Senate first. Senator Philip Hart (MI) introduced the legislation, as he was a main proponent. He also introduced the legislation on behalf of Senators Bartlett, Metcalf, Mondale, Muskie, and Neuberger. The bill was debated for the first time, in the Senate, on May 27, 1966. It was later passed to the House on June 9, 1966. On October 3, 1966, the House made a few amendments and then passed it back to the Senate. The Senate disagreed to these amendments and asked for a conference. A conference report was later created and then submitted to the House, where it was agreed to. The conference report was then submitted in the Senate and agreed to. After, the bill was sent to President Johnson to be signed. When Johnson signed the Fair Packaging Act, he did so alongside three other bills, two education bills and a "slum rehabilitation program" bill. After he signed what he called the "landmark health and education bills", he publicly stated that the four bills would "help us maintain our vitality here at home," and that they "will act as a beacon of hope to people around the world."

== Provisions of The Fair Packaging and Labeling Act ==
The Fair Packaging and Labeling Act required all "consumer commodities" to have a label. Under the act, consumer commodities were defined as any food, drug, device, or cosmetic, that is produced or distributed for sale through retails sales/agencies for consumption by individuals or used by individuals for the purpose of personal care. Further, labels were defined as any written, printed, or graphic matter affixed to a consumer commodity or affixed to a package containing any consumer commodities.

== See also ==
- California Safe Cosmetics Act of 2005
- Food labeling regulations
- Packaging and labeling
