= Metrication Board =

Dissolved Public Body in the United Kingdom

The Metrication Board was a non-departmental public body that existed in the United Kingdom to promote and co-ordinate metrication within the country. It was set up in 1969, four years after the metrication programme was announced, and wound down in 1981.

== Prelude to metrication ==
The question of whether or not to convert British trade and industry to metric was the subject of a UK Government White Paper in 1951, itself the result of the Hodgson Committee Report of 1949 which unanimously recommended compulsory metrication and currency decimalisation within ten years. The report said "The real problem facing Great Britain is not whether to adhere either to the Imperial or to the metric system, but to maintain two legal systems or to abolish the Imperial." The report also recommended that any change should be done in concert with the Commonwealth (former Empire) and the US, that the UK adopt a decimal currency and that the UK and US harmonise their respective definitions of the yard using the metre as a reference.

Although most of the Hodgson Report was rejected at the time as being premature, within a decade and a half changing patterns in British trade meant that in 1963 a poll by the British Standards Institute (BSI) revealed that the majority of its members favoured a transition to the metric system.

Two years later, after taking a poll of its members, the Confederation of British Industry informed the government that they favoured the adoption of the metric system, though some sectors emphasised the need for a voluntary system of adoption. The metrication programme in the United Kingdom was to have five phases: announcement of policy; metrication of the documentation for materials, specification and engineering design; metrication of engineering-related industries; initiation of a national education programme in the schools and metrication of the wholesale, retail and consumer industries.

== Establishment of the Board ==
In March 1966 the [Parliamentary] Standing Joint Committee on Metrication was appointed and on 26 July 1968, when accepting the committee's report, the government announced that:

- The target date for the completion of the metrication programme was 1975.
- An advisory Metrication Board would be set up.
- Legislation would be passed where necessary.
- There would be no compensation – costs would be borne where they fell.

The Metrication Board was set up with a mandate to "consult, advise, inform, stimulate and coordinate". Its mandate specifically excluded a campaigning role. The board held its first meeting in May 1969 under the chairmanship of Lord Ritchie-Calder when eight committees were set up to deal with the most important sectors of British Industry:

- Agriculture, Forestry, Fisheries and Land
- Distribution, Food and Consumer Goods Industries
- Education and Industrial Training
- Engineering Industries
- Fuel and Power Industries
- Industrial Materials and Construction Industries
- Transport and Communications Industries
- Information Policy

By the time the board was set up, much of the groundwork, especially rewriting of many British Standards using metric units had been done and many of the industries that stood to benefit from metrication had already metricated, or had a metrication programme in progress.

Traditionally the British Government had imposed little regulation on British industry – standards were usually defined by the industry itself, often in conjunction with the British Standards Institution. Legislation relating to units of measure were normally directed at trade with industry being allowed to develop its own standards.

After the general election and change of government in 1970, the incoming government announced its intention to continue to "encourage these voluntary developments, including the use of metric specifications for public purposes as soon as consultation with the suppliers shows this to be practicable".

== White paper ==
In 1972, three years before the target date for completion of the metrication programme, the Metrication Board published a white paper laying out the political and economic rationale behind the adoption of the metric system, identifying the practicalities and potential difficulties of the changeover and outlining the programme. The report emphasised that unlike currency decimalisation, the [remainder of] the programme would be on a phased basis with no M-Day. The report also emphasised the need for co-ordination between the various sectors as all were interdependent and thus that partial metrication was undesirable.

== Activities of the Board ==
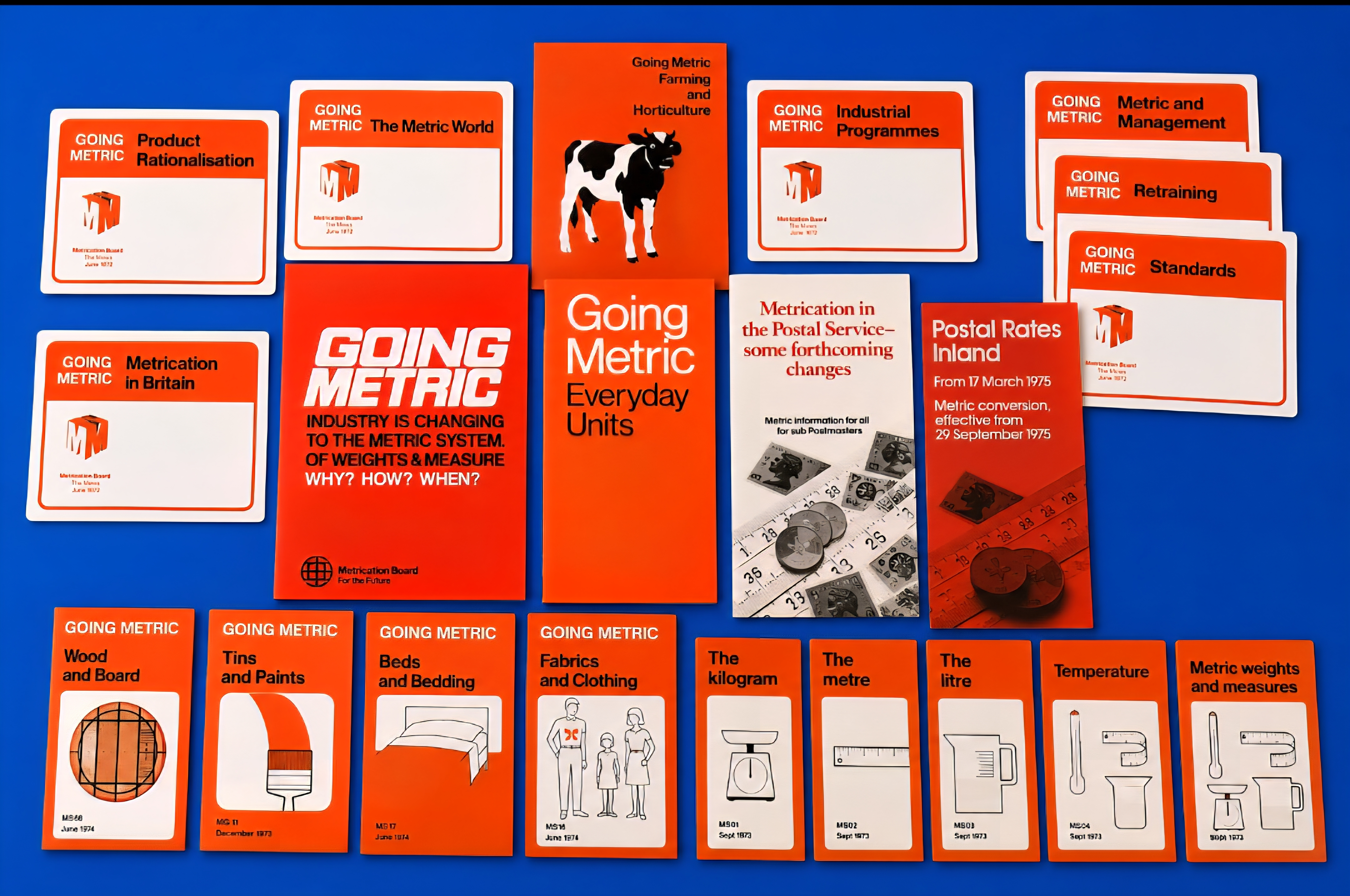
Metrication Board publications and educational materials produced during the United Kingdom metrication programme in the 1970s

Completion of metrication as cited in the Final report of the Metrication Board was:

- 1970 – Electric Cables, British Aerospace designs, London Metal Exchange, Flat glass.
- 1971 – Paper and Board, National Coal Board designs, Pharmaceuticals.
- 1972 – Steel industry, Building regulations
- 1974 – Textile and wool transactions, clothing (dual units)
- 1975 – Retail trade in fabrics and floor coverings, Post office tariffs, medical practice
- 1976 – Bulk sales of petroleum, agriculture and horticulture
- 1977 – Livestock auctions
- 1978 – Solid fuel, cheese wholesaling, London Commodity Market
- Metrication of retail pre-packaged foodstuffs was phased in during 1977 and 1978

== Winding up of the Board ==
Following the 1979 general election and another change of government, Sally Oppenheim, described by the last director of the Metrication Board, Jim Humble, as having "been almost the lone but persistent critic of the metric programme" was appointed Minister of State for Consumer Affairs. On 14 November 1979, six months after her appointment, she announced that no more statutory orders would be made regarding metrication – continued progress would be on a voluntary basis. The following year the Metrication Board was wound up, one of the 457 Quangos that were wound up in the "Quango bonfire" of 1979–81.

The author of the final report of the Metrication Board wrote "Today metric units are used in many important areas of British life – including education; agriculture; construction; industrial materials; much of manufacturing; the wholesaling of petrol, milk, cheese and textiles; fatstock markets and many port fish auctions, nearly all the principal prepacked foods; posts and telecommunications: most freight and customs tariffs; all new and revised Ordnance Survey maps; and athletics. Nevertheless, taken as a whole, Britain is far from being wholly metric." The report identified major areas that had not yet been metricated as being the retail petrol trade (metricated early 1980s), retail sale of loose goods (metricated in 2000) and road signs (as of 2020, only weights are metricated, but not distance).

== Comparable institutions ==
Similar bodies were instituted in other jurisdictions around the world:

- Australia – Metric Conversion Board (1970)
- Canada – the Metric Commission
- Hong Kong – the Metrication Committee
- New Zealand – Metric Advisory Board (1970)
- South Africa – Metrication Advisory Board (1967)
- United States of America – the United States Metric Board
