= The Metric Marvels =

Series of animated shorts concerning the metric system of measurement

- The Metric Marvels, from left to right: Meter Man, Liter Leader, Wonder Gram and Super Celsius
- Voices of: Lynn Ahrens; Bob Dorough; Bob Kaliban; Paul Winchell
- Country of origin: United States
- No. of episodes: 7

Production
- Production companies: Newall & Yohe

Original release
- Network: NBC
- Release: September 1978 – 1979

The Metric Marvels is a 1978–1979 series of seven animated educational shorts featuring songs about meters, liters, Celsius, and grams, designed to teach American children how to use the metric system. They were produced by Newall & Yohe, the same advertising agency which produced ABC's Schoolhouse Rock! series, and first aired on the NBC television network in September 1978. The spots were shown three times each Saturday during the children's programming block for the 1978–79 season.

Voices for the Metric Marvels shorts include Lynn Ahrens, Bob Dorough, Bob Kaliban, and Paul Winchell.

== Origins ==
On December 23, 1975, President Gerald Ford signed the Metric Conversion Act into law; this act gave official sanction for the United States to convert to the metric system of measurement. At the time the United States mainly used the U.S. Customary system. Ford's presidential successor, Jimmy Carter, began to implement this law in earnest, helping to set up the U.S. Metric Board as a task force to determine when and how the U.S. would convert to metric. The USMB suggested that the transition ought to be voluntary and gradual, taking place over at least a ten-year period.

As part of this gradual transition, the USMB sponsored a number of public service announcements on radio and television. The Metric Marvels was one such television PSA, aired during NBC's Saturday morning cartoons. The shorts featured four animated metric superheroes: Meter Man, Liter Leader, Super Celsius and Wonder Gram. Each superhero performed songs designed to teach children the difference between the old English system and the new metric system.

== Episodes ==
1. "Meet Meter Man" / Superhero Meter Man helps people convert length and distance to metric terms
2. "Mara-Mara-Marathon" / The difference between miles and kilometers
3. "I'm Your Liter Leader" / Superhero Liter Leader explains the difference between gallons and liters
4. "Eeny, Meeny, Miney Milliliters" / Liter Leader uses recipes to explain milliliters
5. "Super Celsius" / Superhero Super Celsius explains the Celsius temperature scale
6. "Wonder Gram" / Superhero Wonder Gram expresses her weight in kilograms
7. "Wonder Baby" / A young Wonder Gram converts pounds to kilograms

== Legacy ==
The series shared the animation style, song quality and voice actors with the popular Schoolhouse Rock! on rival network ABC. Incoming NBC president Fred Silverman, formerly of ABC, may have thought to replicate the success of that show; Newall & Yohe also produced Saturday morning network IDs and the full-length Drawing Power! series for NBC. Despite this, the series was pulled from the air after a single seven-episode season. Being separated from Schoolhouse Rock! prevented the series from having an afterlife in reruns. Moreover, at the time NBC was ranked third place in viewership among the three dominant television networks.

A deadline for metrication was never passed into United States federal law, and the push for metrication in the United States lost traction following the 1982 dissolution of the United States Metric Board under President Ronald Reagan. U.S. metrication is currently overseen by the National Institute of Standards and Technology, whose newer series League of SI Superheroes bears some similarities to The Metric Marvels, including a character named Meter Man with many similarities to the identically named character in the latter series.

== Media ==
The Metric Marvels was released on VHS for educational buyers only in 1979 by Newell and Yohe, Inc.; Center for Humanities, Mount Kisco, NY. This release was in color and included one videocassette (approximately 17 min. 30 sec.) and seven teacher's guides, described as "seven 2 1/2 minute segments in which four animated superheroes explain the metric system" and carried the note "Previously issued as seven filmstrips by Xerox Films". The Xerox Films filmstrip release was described as "Elementary and junior high school, Filmstrip" and included seven 35 mm color filmstrips (approximately 200 frames), seven audiocassettes and five teacher's guides. Xerox Films was a producer of films for schools and libraries, and was one of the 10 companies making up The Xerox Education Group at the time.
