= USMB =

USMB may stand for:

- Université Savoie Mont Blanc, a French university.
- Union Sportive de la Médina de Blida, an Algerian football team
- United States. Conference of Mennonite Brethren Churches, a United States association of churches
- United States Metric Board, a United States government agency set up to encourage metrication
