= US Metric Association =

Non-profit organisation based in Windsor, Colorado, USA

- US Metric Association logo
- Abbreviation: USMA
- Named after: The metric system (now SI)
- Formation: 27 December 1916; 109 years ago
- Founder: A group of businessmen, educators, and consumers
- Founded at: Columbia University, New York
- Purpose: Advocates completing the US conversion to the International System of Units (SI)
- Headquarters: Colorado
- Affiliations: American Association for the Advancement of Science (AAAS)
- Website: usma.org
- Formerly called: American Metric Association

The US Metric Association (USMA), based in Colorado, is an organization that advocates for total conversion of the United States to the International System of Units (SI), also called the metric system. Founded on 27 December 1916 at Columbia University in New York City, it was originally called the American Metric Association.

== Background ==
The Metric Act of 1866, also known as the Kasson Act, legally protected use of the metric system in commerce from lawsuit in the United States, and provided an official conversion table from United States customary units.

The Metre Convention was signed on 20 May 1875 by the United States and other countries, and therefore the International Bureau of Weights and Measures was created under the supervision of the International Committee for Weights and Measures, presided by Carlos Ibáñez e ibáñez de Ibero. The Bureau is an intergovernmental organisation, through which its 67 member-states, including the United States, act on measurement standards in areas including the metric system.

The Mendenhall Order, issued in 1893 by Thomas Corwin Mendenhall, marked a decision to change the fundamental standards of length and mass of the United States from the customary standards based on those of England to metric standards.

The Metric Conversion Act of 1975 declared the metric system "the preferred system of weights and measures for United States trade and commerce", but permitted the use of United States customary units in all activities. It also established the United States Metric Board to encourage metrication, although the board was abolished in 1982.

== Awards ==
The USMA annually (since 2017) awards the National Metric Scholarship Award and the National Metric Award.

== Mission ==
According to itself, the mission of the USMA is: "The USMA advocates completion of the ongoing US conversion to the metric system, officially known as the International System of Units (SI)."

== Newsletter ==
The USMA publishes a bi-monthly newsletter for its members called Metric Today, which features the latest developments in U.S. metrication efforts. It has been published continuously since 1966.

== See also ==
- European units of measurement directives
- Metrication in Australia
- Metrication in New Zealand
- Metric Martyrs
- UK Metric Association
- United States Metric Board
