= Metrication in the United States =

Adoption of the metric system in the United States

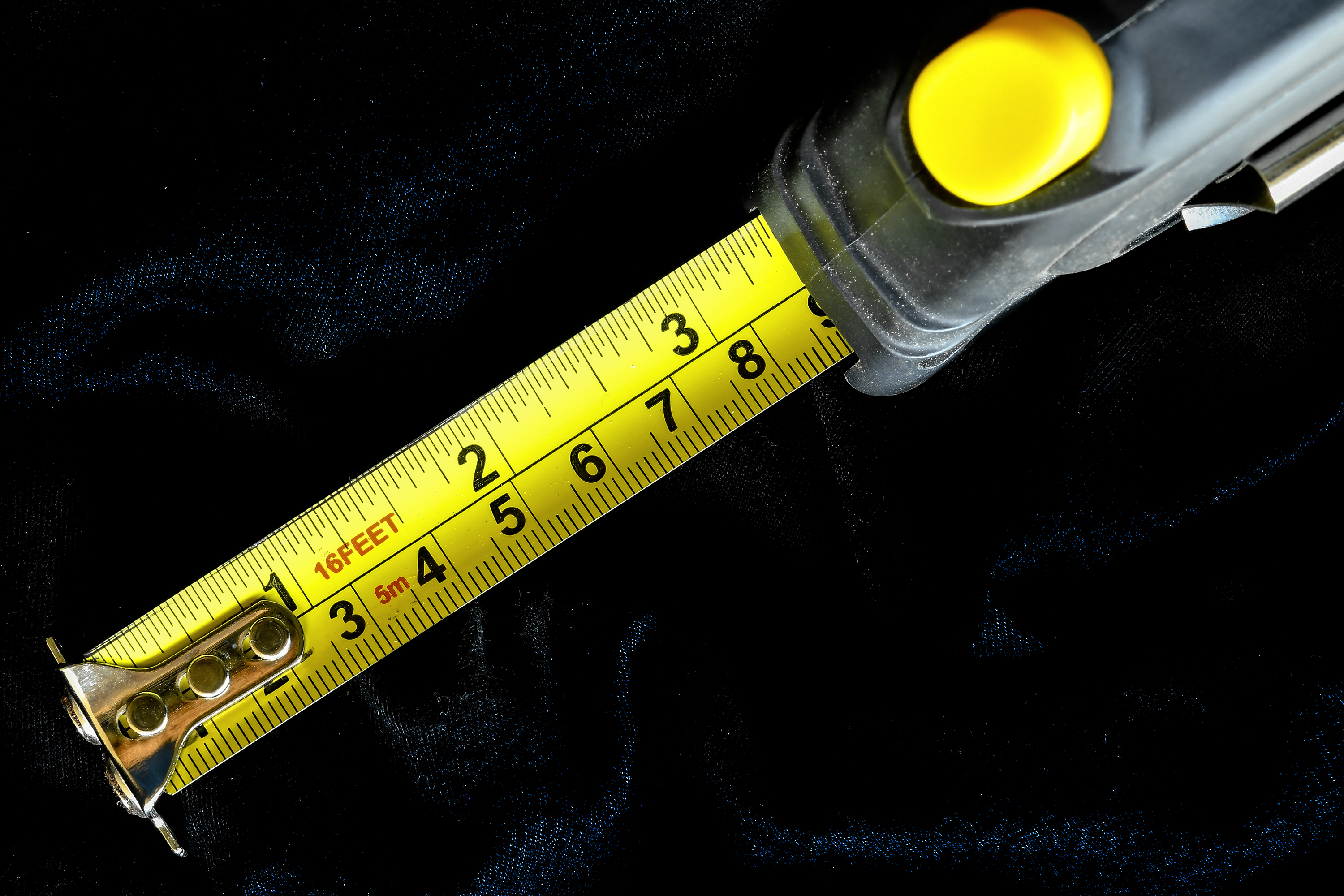
Tape measure with customary (inch) and metric (cm) markings

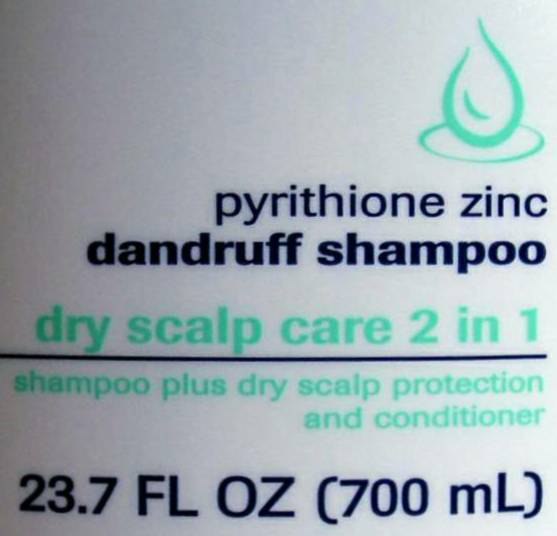
A shampoo label from the U.S. that shows a round metric quantity taking secondary status in parentheses next to non-integer U.S. customary quantity

Metrication in the United States is the gradual and still incomplete adoption of the International System of Units (SI). The metric system has been legal in trade since the Metric Act of 1866, the United States was an original signatory of the Metre Convention in 1875, and since the Mendenhall Order of 1893 customary units have been defined in terms of metric standards. Since 2023, the foot has had a single definition of exactly 0.3048 meters, following the retirement of the U.S. survey foot.

Federal policy has favored conversion since the Metric Conversion Act of 1975, which created the United States Metric Board to coordinate a voluntary changeover. Public resistance and the Board's lack of authority stalled the effort, and it was abolished in 1982. The Omnibus Trade and Competitiveness Act of 1988 made the metric system the "preferred system of weights and measures for United States trade and commerce", and Executive Order 12770 (1991) directed federal agencies to use it in procurement, grants and other business activities where economically feasible. Conversion has never been made mandatory, and there is strong public resistance to going further.

Use today splits by sector. Science, medicine, the military, pharmaceuticals, electronics and vehicle manufacturing are largely metric, and most packaged consumer goods must carry dual labeling. Customary units still dominate everyday life, including road signs, weather reports, cooking, construction and body measurements.

== History ==
=== 18th century ===
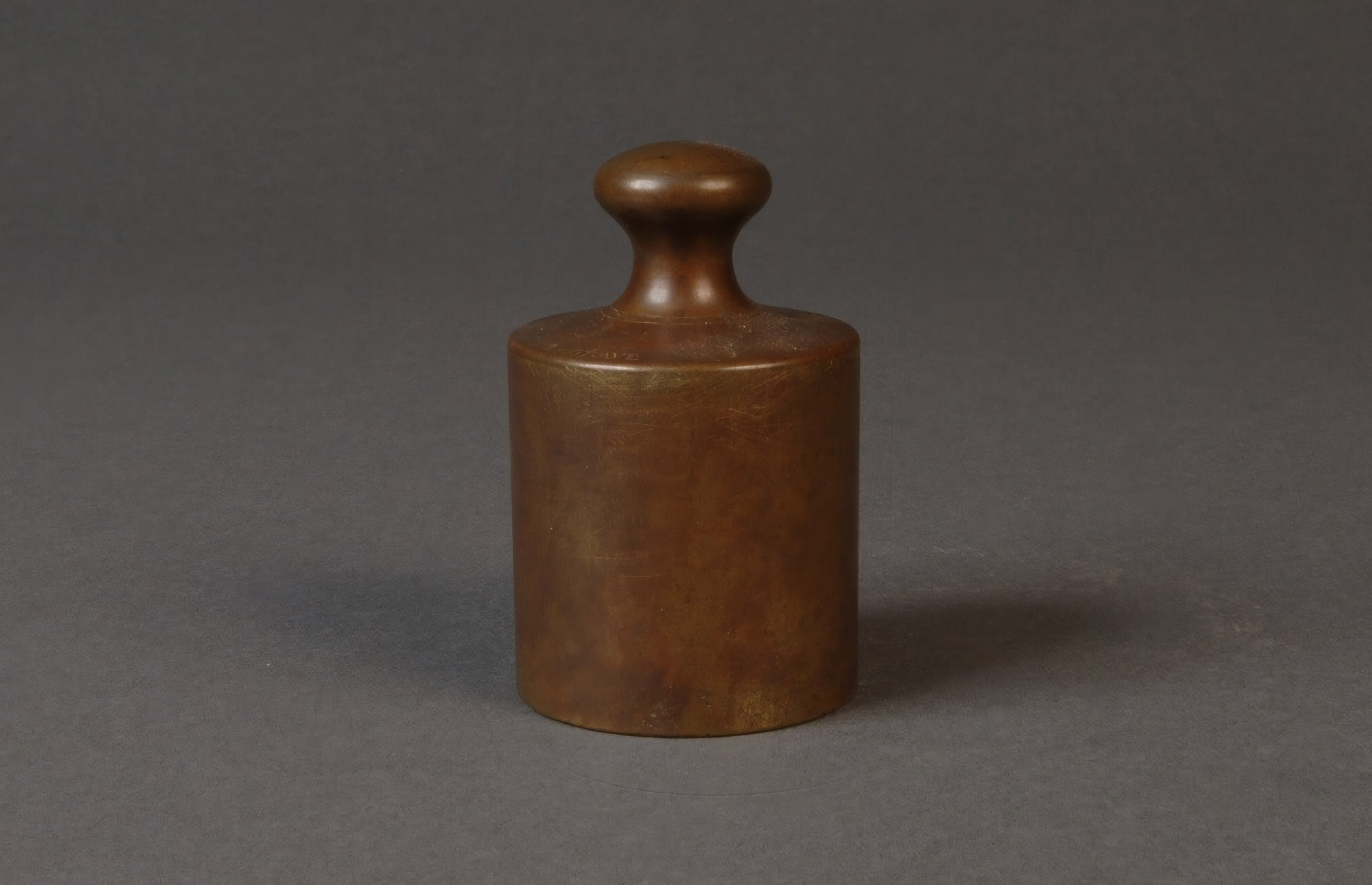
The 'grave' of 1793, an early version of the kilogram

Immediately after gaining independence from Great Britain, the United States used a variety of units of measure, including Dutch units and English units. The 1789 Constitution grants Congress the authority to determine standards of measure, though Congress did not immediately use this authority to impose a uniform system. The United States was one of the first nations to adopt a decimal currency, under the Coinage Act of 1792.

In 1793, Thomas Jefferson requested equipment from France that could be used to evaluate the metric system. Joseph Dombey was sent with a standard kilogram, but his ship was blown off course by a storm and captured by British privateers in the Caribbean, and he died in captivity on Montserrat.

=== 19th century ===
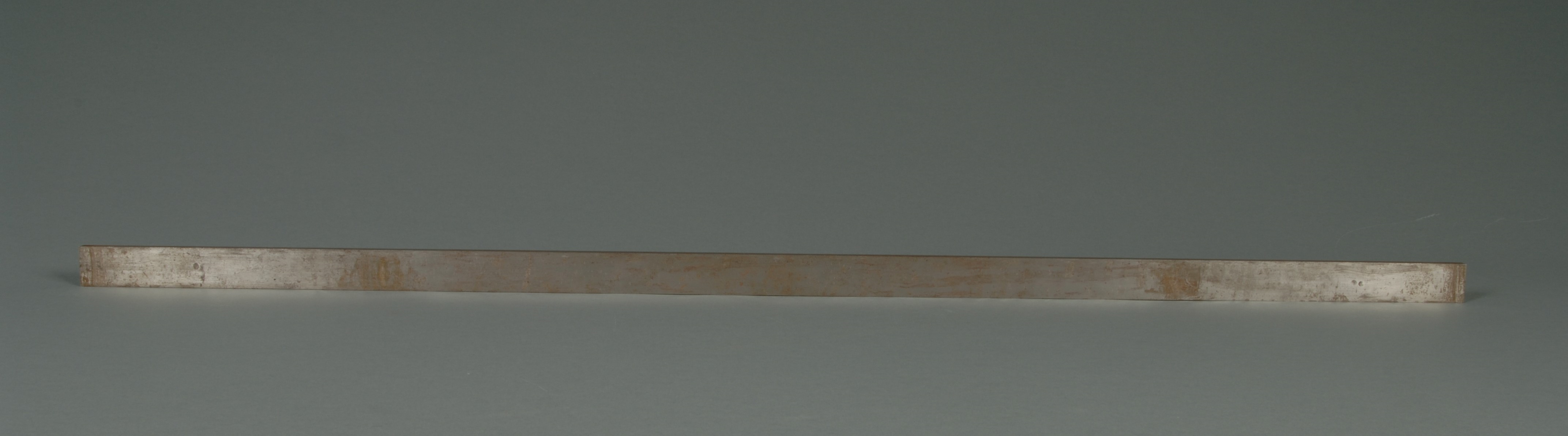
Committee Meter Bar, made of platinum, 1799

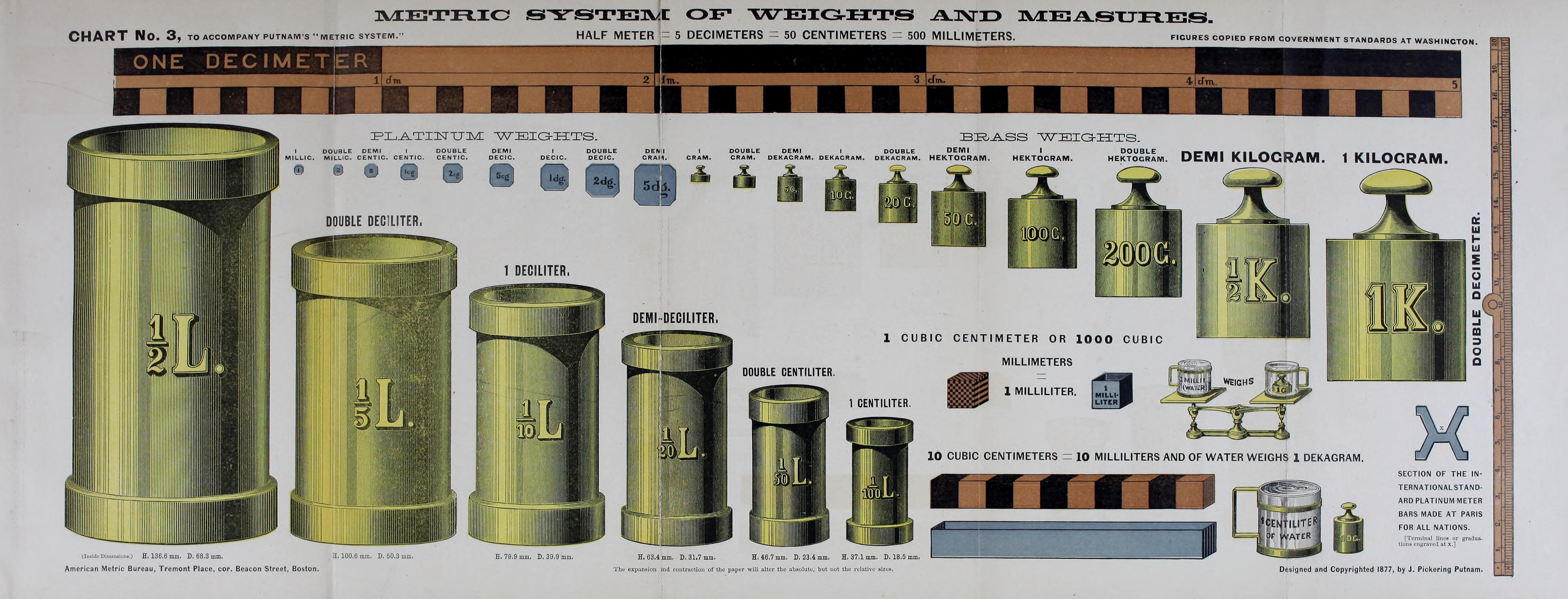
Metric System of Weights and Measures Chart 1877

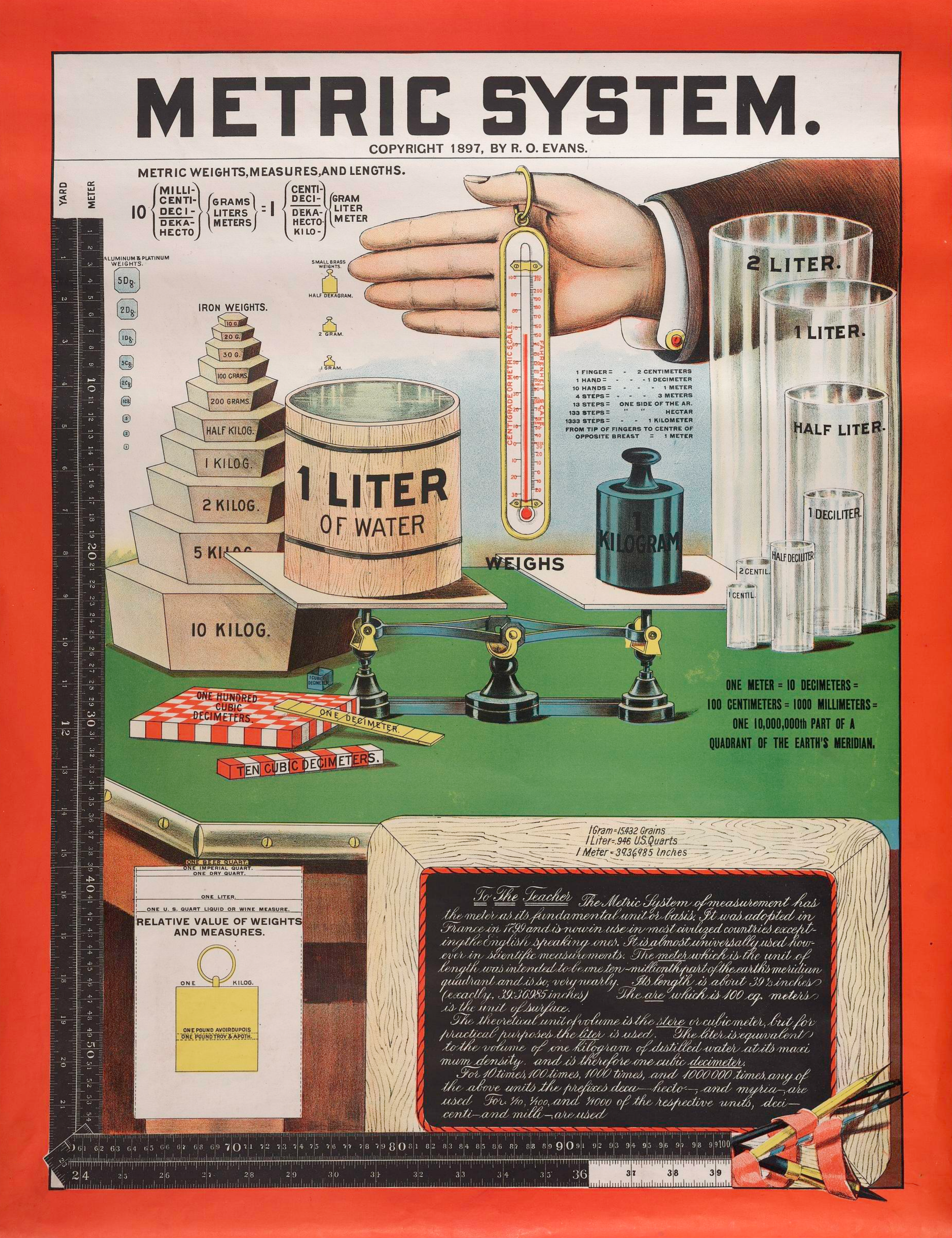
Metric System Chart by R. O. Evans, 1897

In the early 19th century, the U.S. Coast and Geodetic Survey, the government's surveying and map-making agency, used a physical meter standard, the "Committee Meter", brought from Switzerland.

In 1832, the Treasury Department adopted standards for the main customary units, including the yard, the avoirdupois pound, the 231-cubic-inch gallon and the Winchester bushel, based on work by Ferdinand Rudolph Hassler.

Shortly after the American Civil War, the 39th United States Congress protected the use of the metric system in commerce with the Metric Act of 1866 and supplied each state with a set of standard metric weights and measures.

In 1875, the United States became one of the original seventeen signatory nations to the Metre Convention, also known as the Treaty of the Metre. The treaty concluded five years of meetings in which the metric system was reformulated and its standards refined. It established the International Bureau of Weights and Measures (Bureau international des poids et mesures, BIPM) in Sèvres, France, to provide standards of measurement for worldwide use.

On July 4, 1876, Melvil Dewey (known for his Dewey Decimal Classification) incorporated the American Metric Bureau in Boston to sell rulers and other metric measuring tools. Dewey had hoped to make his fortune selling metric supplies.

Under the Mendenhall Order of 1893, metric standards developed through the BIPM were officially adopted as the fundamental standards for length and mass in the United States, though some metric standards were already in use. The foot, pound and other customary units have been defined in terms of metric units ever since.

The 1895 Constitution of Utah, in Article X, Section 11, required that "The Metric System shall be taught in the public schools of the State." This section was repealed, effective July 1, 1987.

=== 20th century ===
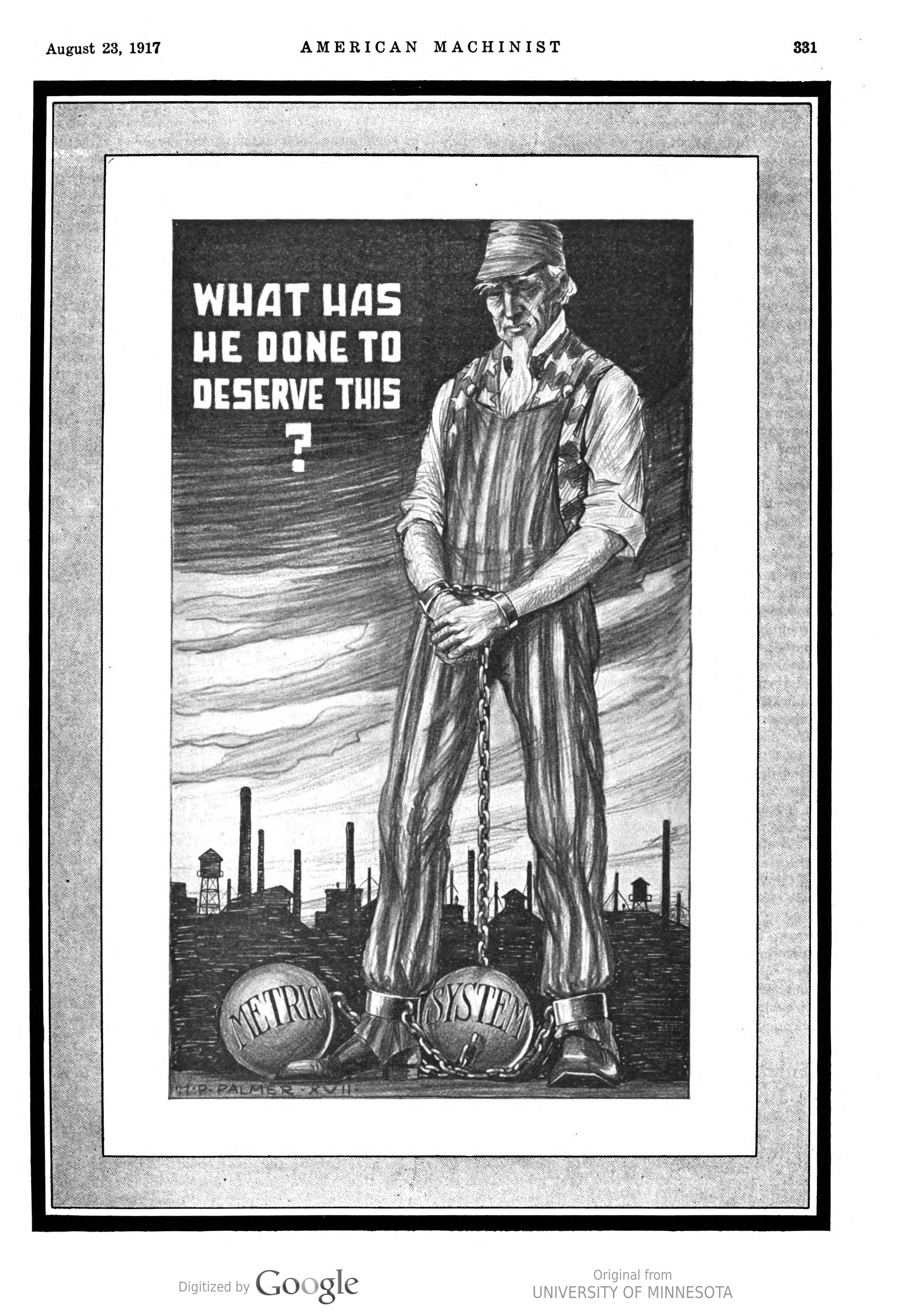
A 1917 political cartoon opposing metrication in the United States

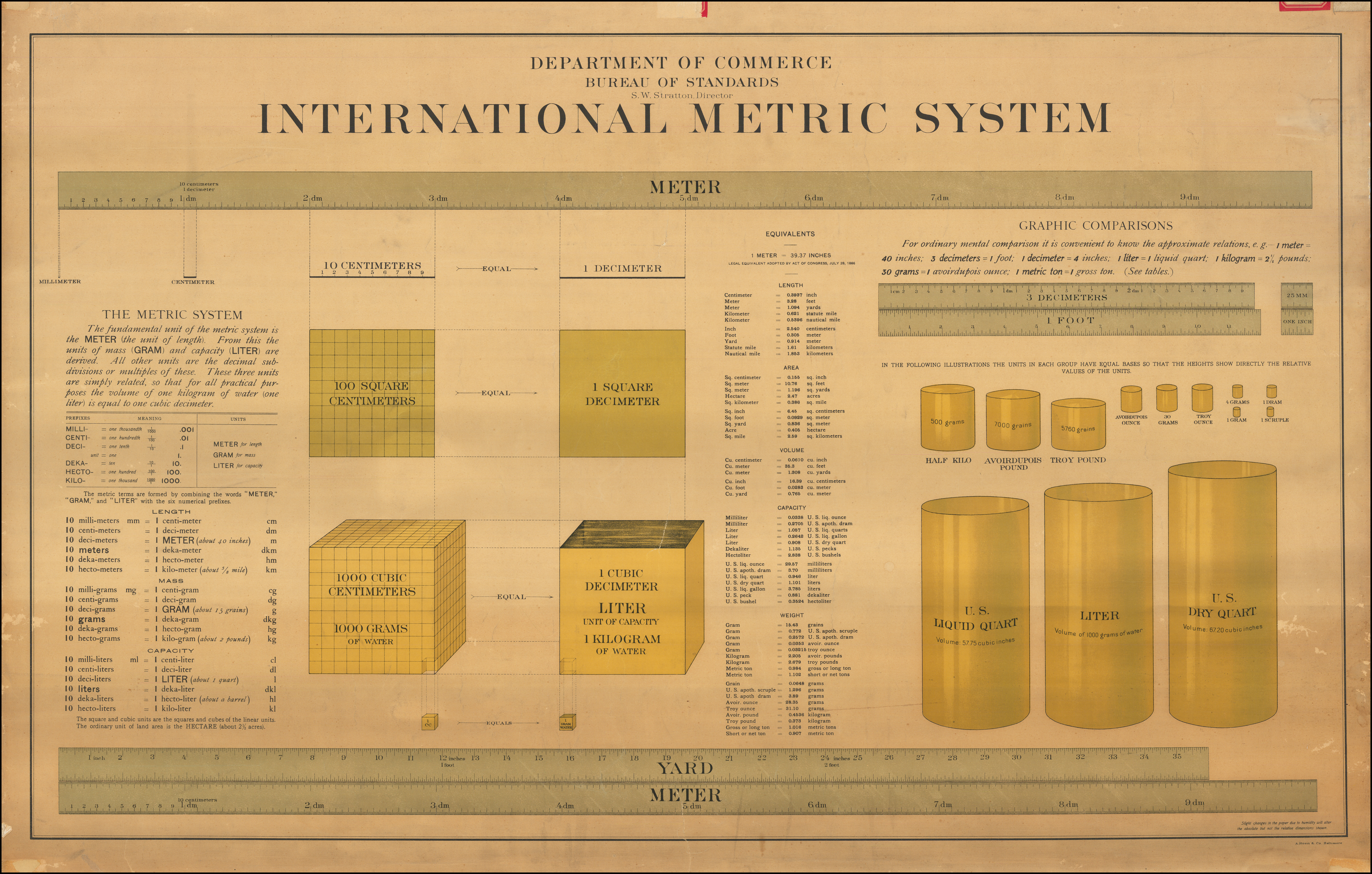
International Metric System U.S. Bureau of Standards Chart c. 1900

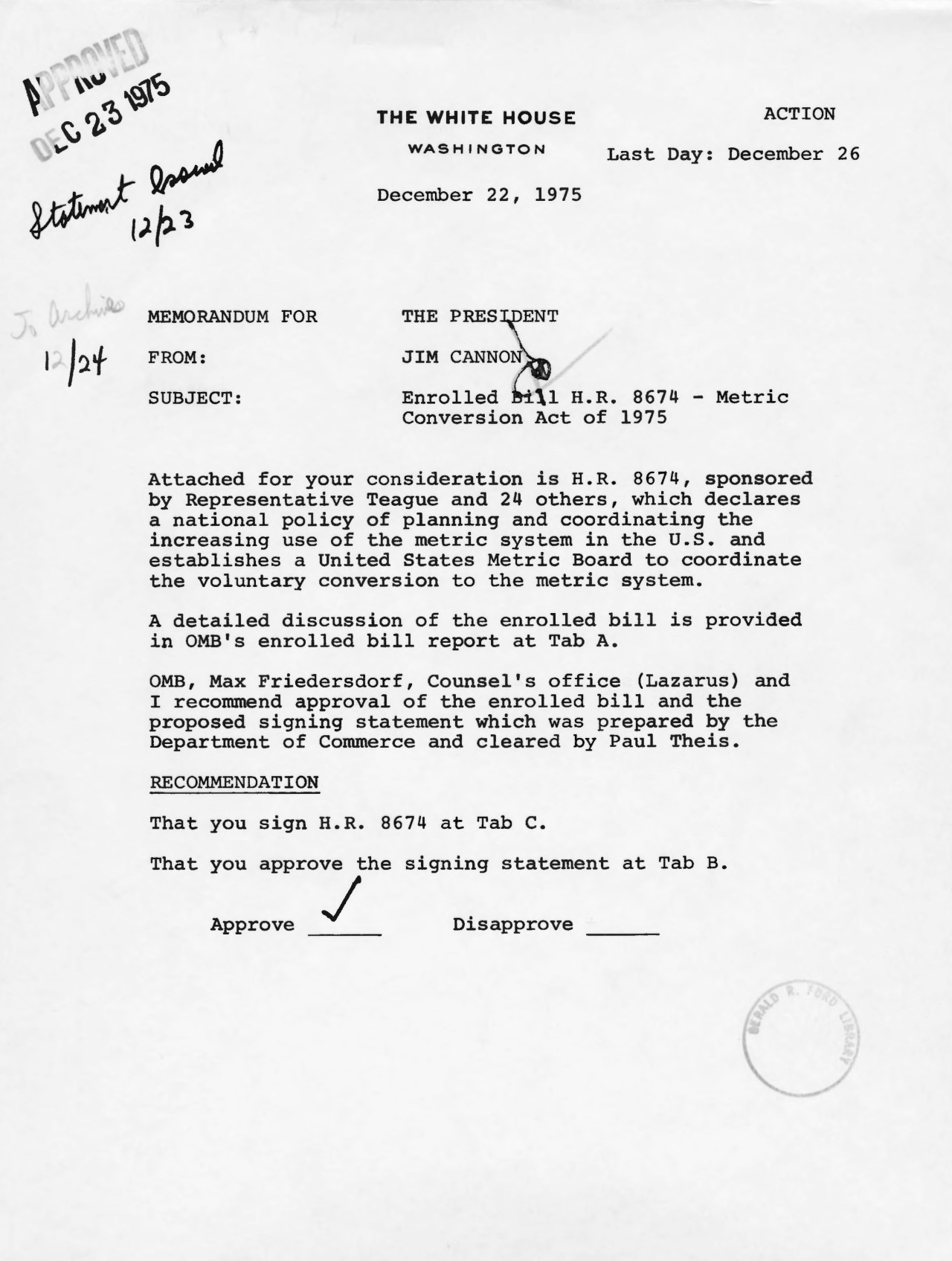
Metric Conversion Act of 1975 approved by President Gerald Ford

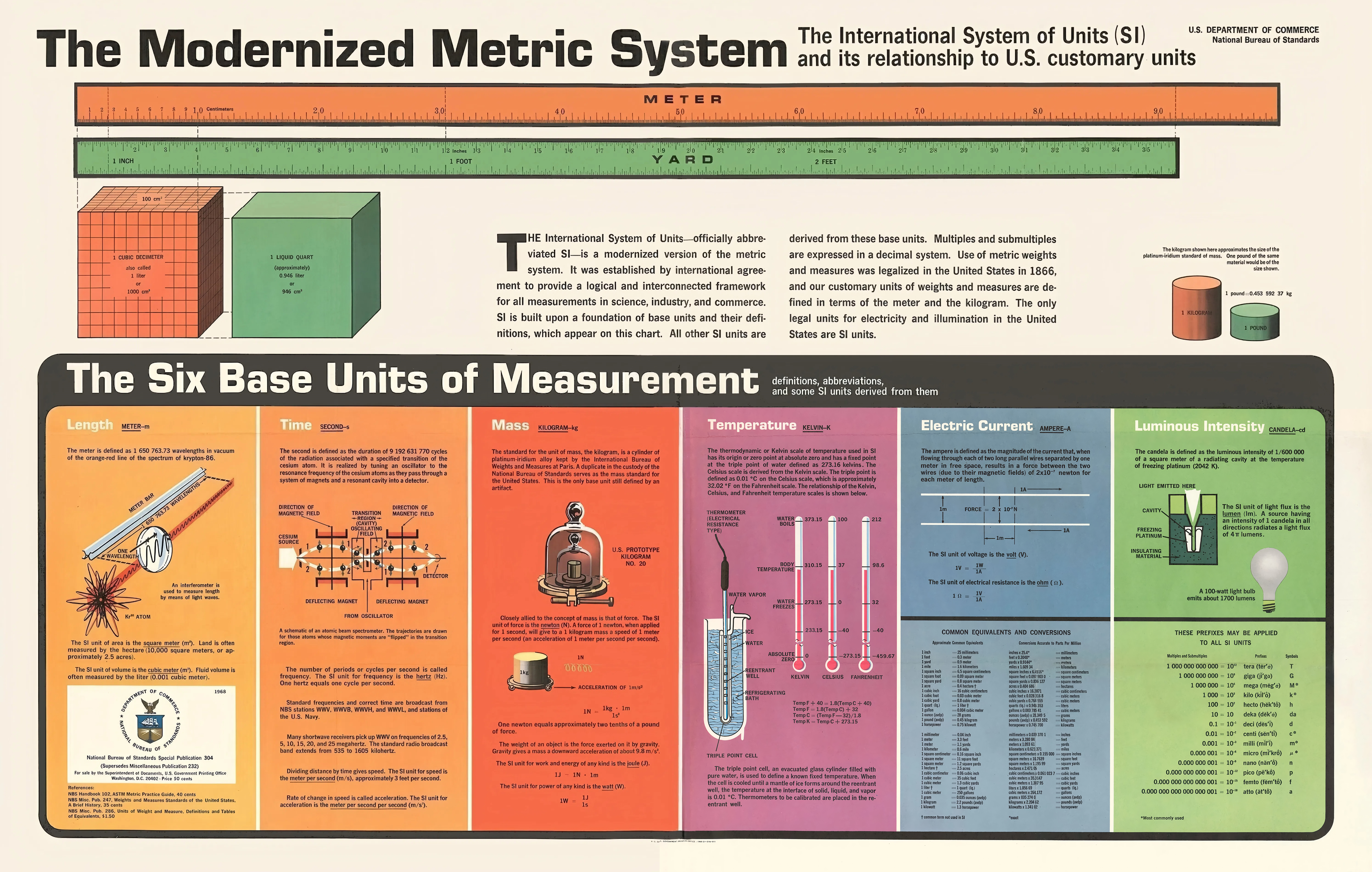
Modernized Metric System Chart by the National Bureau of Standards, 1968

ANMC logo

In 1959, the United States agreed with other English-speaking countries on the international yard and pound, fixing the yard at exactly 0.9144 meters and the pound at exactly 0.45359237 kilograms. The same notice named the older, slightly longer foot the "U.S. survey foot" and restricted it to geodetic surveying, with the intention that it would eventually be replaced.

The General Conference on Weights and Measures is the governing body for the modern metric system and comprises the signing nations of the Treaty of the Metre. In 1960 it approved an updated version of the metric system named Le Système international d'unités (International System of Units), abbreviated SI.

On February 10, 1964, the National Bureau of Standards (now the National Institute of Standards and Technology) issued a statement that it would use the metric system, except where this would have an obvious detrimental effect.

U.S. metrication logo

In 1968, Congress authorized the U.S. Metric Study, a three-year study of systems of measurement in the United States, with emphasis on the feasibility of metrication. The United States Department of Commerce conducted the study. A 45-member advisory panel consulted and took testimony from hundreds of consumers, business organizations, labor groups, manufacturers, and state and local officials. The final report concluded that the U.S. would eventually join the rest of the world in using the metric system. It found that metric units were already used in many areas and that their use was increasing. Most participants believed conversion was in the country's best interests, particularly given the importance of foreign trade and the growing influence of technology.

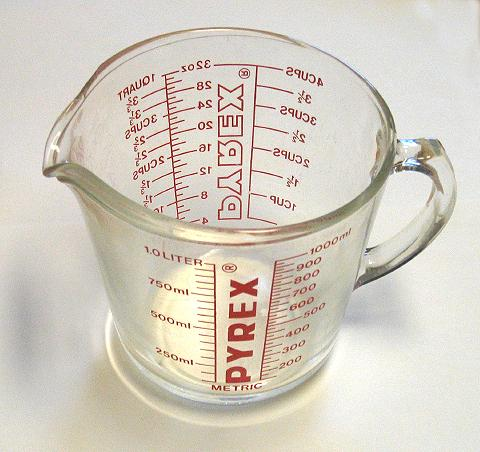
This measuring cup, manufactured and sold in the United States circa 1980 at the height of the metrication effort, features graduations in both metric and United States customary units, with the metric graduations in front for right-handed users.

The study recommended a carefully planned transition to predominantly metric use over a decade. Congress passed the Metric Conversion Act of 1975 "to coordinate and plan the increasing use of the metric system in the United States". Conversion was voluntary, and the United States Metric Board (USMB) was established for planning, coordination, and public education. The education effort raised awareness, but the public response included resistance, apathy, and confusion. Federal agencies also promoted the change directly to the public; the U.S. Office of Education, for example, produced a television public service announcement on metric education in 1978. In 1981, the USMB reported to Congress that it lacked the clear mandate needed to bring about national conversion. Because of this, and because the Reagan administration was looking to cut federal spending (White House advisor Lyn Nofziger was particularly active against the Board), the USMB was disbanded in the autumn of 1982.

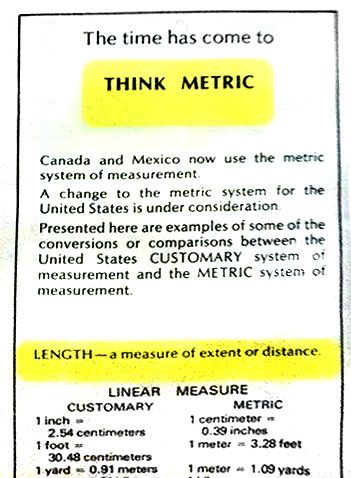
1980s Road Map mentioning an impending change to the metric system

The end of the USMB increased doubts that metrication would really happen. Public and private sector conversion slowed even as international competition and the demands of global markets increased.

The American National Metric Council (ANMC) was established in 1973 by the American National Standards Institute (ANSI) as a non-profit, tax-exempt organization for planning and coordinating metric activity in all sectors of the U.S. economy. It became a separately incorporated organization in 1976. The ANMC aimed to keep conversion voluntary and orderly, minimizing costs and maximizing benefits, and provided information, forums and assistance to its subscribers.

Unlike the USMB, which only implemented the policy set out in the Metric Conversion Act, the ANMC tried to coordinate metric planning across industrial sectors. Its committees submitted conversion plans for the chemical and instruments sectors, which the USMB later approved. From 1975 through 1987, the ANMC held a series of well-attended annual conferences. National Metric Conferences, jointly sponsored by the ANMC, the U.S. Metric Association (USMA), the Department of Commerce, and NIST, followed from 1989 through 1993.

National Metric Week, begun by the National Council of Teachers of Mathematics, was first held in 1976 during the week beginning on May 10. It continued to be held in May until 1983, when it was moved to the week of October 10 because the original date was too close to the end of the school year.

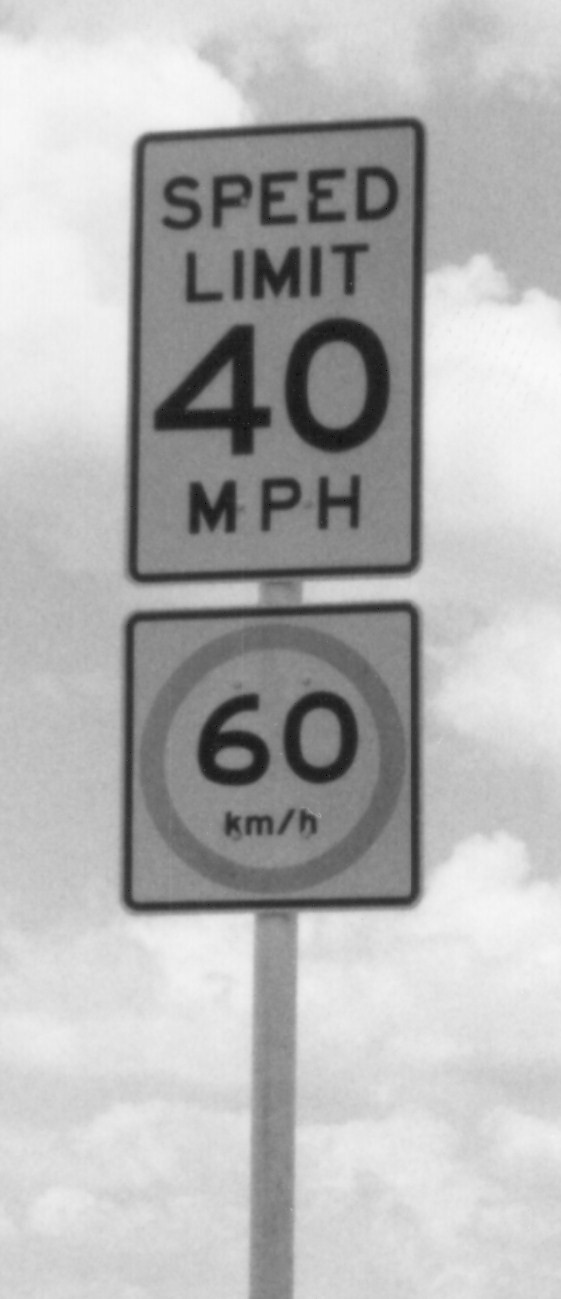
Former dual miles per hour and kilometers per hour sign in Florida, erected in the 1980s

Congress gave new encouragement to industrial metrication in the Omnibus Trade and Competitiveness Act of 1988. This amended the Metric Conversion Act of 1975 and designated the metric system as "the preferred system of weights and measures for United States trade and commerce". The legislation states that the federal government has a responsibility to assist industry, especially small business, as it voluntarily converts, and it required most federal agencies to use the metric system in their procurement, grants, and other business-related activities by the end of 1992.

Executive Order 12770, signed by President George H. W. Bush on July 25, 1991, directed executive branch departments and agencies to "take all appropriate measures within their authority" to use the metric system in procurement, grants, and other business-related activities, to the extent economically feasible, by September 30, 1992. Metric use was not required where it was impractical or likely to cause significant inefficiencies or loss of markets to U.S. firms. The order made the Secretary of Commerce responsible for coordinating implementation across the government and authorized an Interagency Council on Metric Policy.

Some members of Congress attempted to ban use of the metric system on federal highways in 1992 and 1993. These bills were unpopular in the House of Representatives and failed before a vote.

While not mandating metric use in the private sector, the federal government has sought to act as a catalyst for conversion in trade, industry, and commerce. Exceptions were made for the highway and construction industries. The Department of Transportation planned to require metric units by 2000, but this plan was canceled by the Transportation Equity Act for the 21st Century (TEA-21) of 1998. By then, 43 state transportation departments had begun converting to metric, and in 1999 the Federal Highway Administration reported that most had substantially converted their design and construction work, warning that "reversion to inch-pound units by some States will perpetuate a confusing mix of measurement systems". Many states nevertheless reverted over the following decade. The California Department of Transportation, which had adopted metric units as its preferred system in 1993, released its 2006 standards in customary units and required customary units for nearly all projects submitted after June 30, 2007. The Florida Department of Transportation stopped using its metric design standards for projects let from July 2006.

The use of two unit systems caused the loss of the Mars Climate Orbiter on September 23, 1999. NASA specified metric units, but ground software supplied by Lockheed Martin, the spacecraft's prime contractor, reported thruster impulse in pound-force seconds rather than newton-seconds. Because one pound-force second is about 4.45 newton-seconds, the navigation team's models understated the effect of each thruster firing by that factor. The spacecraft was intended to reach an altitude of about 150 kilometers (93 mi) above Mars, but instead descended to about 57 kilometers (35 mi) and is presumed to have been destroyed in the Martian atmosphere.

=== 21st century ===
The case for national metrication rests on the premise that U.S. industrial and commercial productivity, mathematics and science education, and international competitiveness would all benefit. Gerard Iannelli, director of the U.S. Metric Program, said in 2001 that Americans had not converted because of the effort needed to "translate" from customary to metric units when both are not shown, and because of what he saw as ineffective public education.

In June 2010, NIST called for an amendment to the Fair Packaging and Labeling Act that would let manufacturers label packages solely in metric units, rather than the dual labeling currently required. The aim was to encourage metric labeling, bring U.S. labeling law closer to international practice, and simplify trade. NIST Metric Program coordinator Elizabeth Gentry said the proposal was "in response to requests by U.S. manufacturers and consumers", particularly that "manufacturers want to take control of the limited net quantity of contents real estate on their packaging."

In December 2012, a petition on the White House's petitioning system asked the administration to "Make the Metric system the standard in the United States, instead of the Imperial system." By January 10, 2013, it had passed 25,000 signatures, the threshold then needed for an official response. Patrick D. Gallagher, director of NIST, responded that customary units were already defined in terms of the metric system, making the nation "bilingual" in measurement, and that using the metric system was a choice for individuals.

Early in 2013, state Representative Karl Rhoads introduced bill HB36 into the Hawaii House of Representatives to make the metric system mandatory in the state from January 1, 2018. By June 2014, the bill had not gained enough support and was considered dead. In January 2019, Rhoads introduced SB428 to the Hawaii State Legislature, saying that "strong reasons exist for Hawaii and other states to switch to the metric system". It proposed a task force to explore metric distances and speeds on public signs. Neither bill became law.

In January 2015, Oregon State Senator Brian Boquist, at the request of metric enthusiast David Pearl, proposed Oregon Senate Bill 166, which would have made the International System of Units the official units of measurement in the state. The bill was still in the Senate Rules Committee when the legislature adjourned on July 6, 2015. A 2017 Senate Joint Memorial, also requested by Pearl, urging Congress to make SI the country's official system of measurement likewise stalled in committee.

Lincoln Chafee made switching to metric units part of his campaign for the 2016 Democratic presidential nomination. He ended his campaign on October 23, 2015.

In October 2020, NIST and the National Geodetic Survey announced that the U.S. survey foot would be retired after December 31, 2022. From January 1, 2023, the international foot of exactly 0.3048 meters became the single definition of the foot for all applications, ending more than sixty years of two slightly different feet being in use.

== Current use ==
=== Government and law ===
NIST runs a Metric (SI) Program to support voluntary conversion across government and industry. Federal agencies are expected to use metric units in procurement and grants, but customary units remain common in government, most visibly on road signs.

The National Conference on Weights and Measures (NCWM) has removed barriers to metric units in all of its model laws and regulations, so that businesses and consumers are free to use them. Since January 1, 2000, the Uniform Packaging and Labeling Regulation (UPLR, NIST Handbook 130) has allowed metric-only net quantity declarations on consumer packages not subject to federal regulation. Packages covered by the federal Fair Packaging and Labeling Act must still be dual-labeled.

The United States is often described, together with Liberia and Myanmar, as one of only three countries that have not adopted the metric system. NIST calls this a misconception: metric use is mandatory in some countries and voluntary in others, and every country, including the United States, has recognized and adopted the SI.

Federal drug law defines penalty thresholds for controlled substances in metric masses.

=== Education ===
Under the Common Core mathematics standards, students work with both metric and customary units from second grade onward, and learn to convert within each system in fourth and fifth grade. A 2022 study in the International Journal of Mathematical Education in Science and Technology estimated that dropping customary units from mathematics instruction would save between $1.603 billion and $2.506 billion a year, with a present discounted value of between $53.4 and $83.5 billion over time.

=== Everyday life ===
==== General ====
Many Americans learn common metric units at school, and units introduced by scientists and engineers since the 18th century, such as the volt, megapixel, and kiloton, are metric by nature. The United States uses the second, the SI unit of time, like every other country. Residential electricity is billed in kilowatt hours, and light bulb packaging has given brightness in lumens since the Federal Trade Commission introduced its "Lighting Facts" label.

In the kitchen, customary units are the norm: recipes use cups, tablespoons, teaspoons and ounces, and oven temperatures are given in degrees Fahrenheit.

==== Weather ====
Public weather forecasts from the National Weather Service and broadcasters are given almost entirely in customary units: degrees Fahrenheit for temperature and dew point, miles per hour for wind speed (knots in marine forecasts), inches of mercury for atmospheric pressure, fractions of an inch for rain and ice, and whole inches for snow. Wave heights are given in feet. Hailstones are usually described by comparison with familiar objects, such as dime-sized or golf ball-sized. Pressure readings for hurricanes are usually given in millibars, and the use of inches of mercury in that context is declining.

==== Food and drink ====
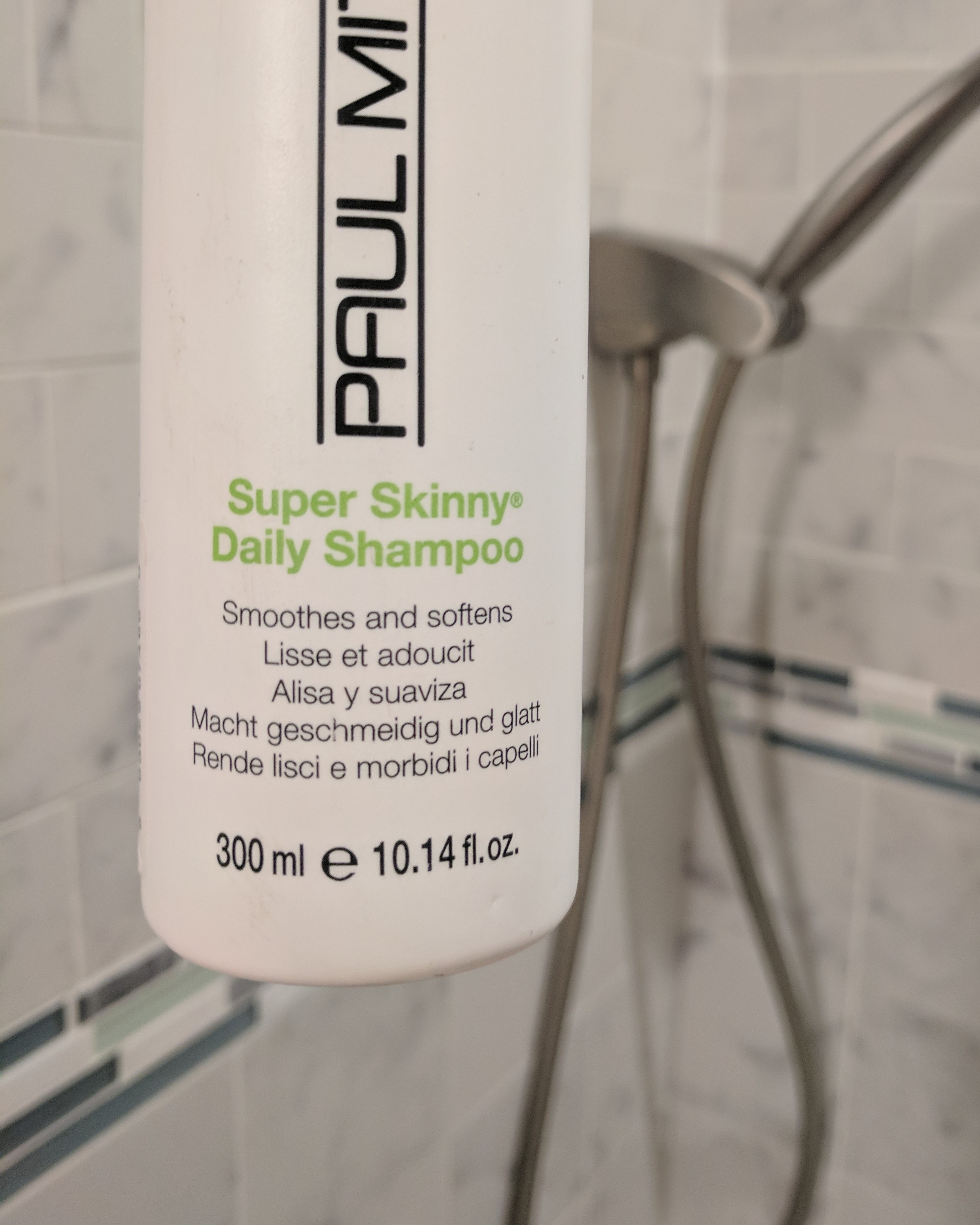
A shampoo bottle labeled with mL first and fl oz second. The ℮ estimated net quantity symbol indicates the product also conforms to European Union regulations.

Some consumer products come in round metric sizes, a trend that appears to be growing because of international manufacturing and distribution. The two-liter bottle is one of the most familiar metric packages, and some supermarket chains sell store brand soft drinks in 3-liter sizes. Soft drinks in 1-liter, 0.5-liter and 1.25-liter bottles are increasingly sold alongside 12, 16, 20 and 24 fl oz (355, 473, 591 and 710 mL) sizes. The half-liter water bottle (16.9 fl oz) has nearly replaced the 16-ounce size, and 700 mL and one-liter sizes are also common, though 20 and 24 fl oz sizes remain popular, particularly in vending machines.

Attempts to sell milk in 3- or 4-liter jugs instead of gallons (3.785 L) have largely failed. Milk is still sold in half-pints, pints, quarts, half-gallons and gallons.

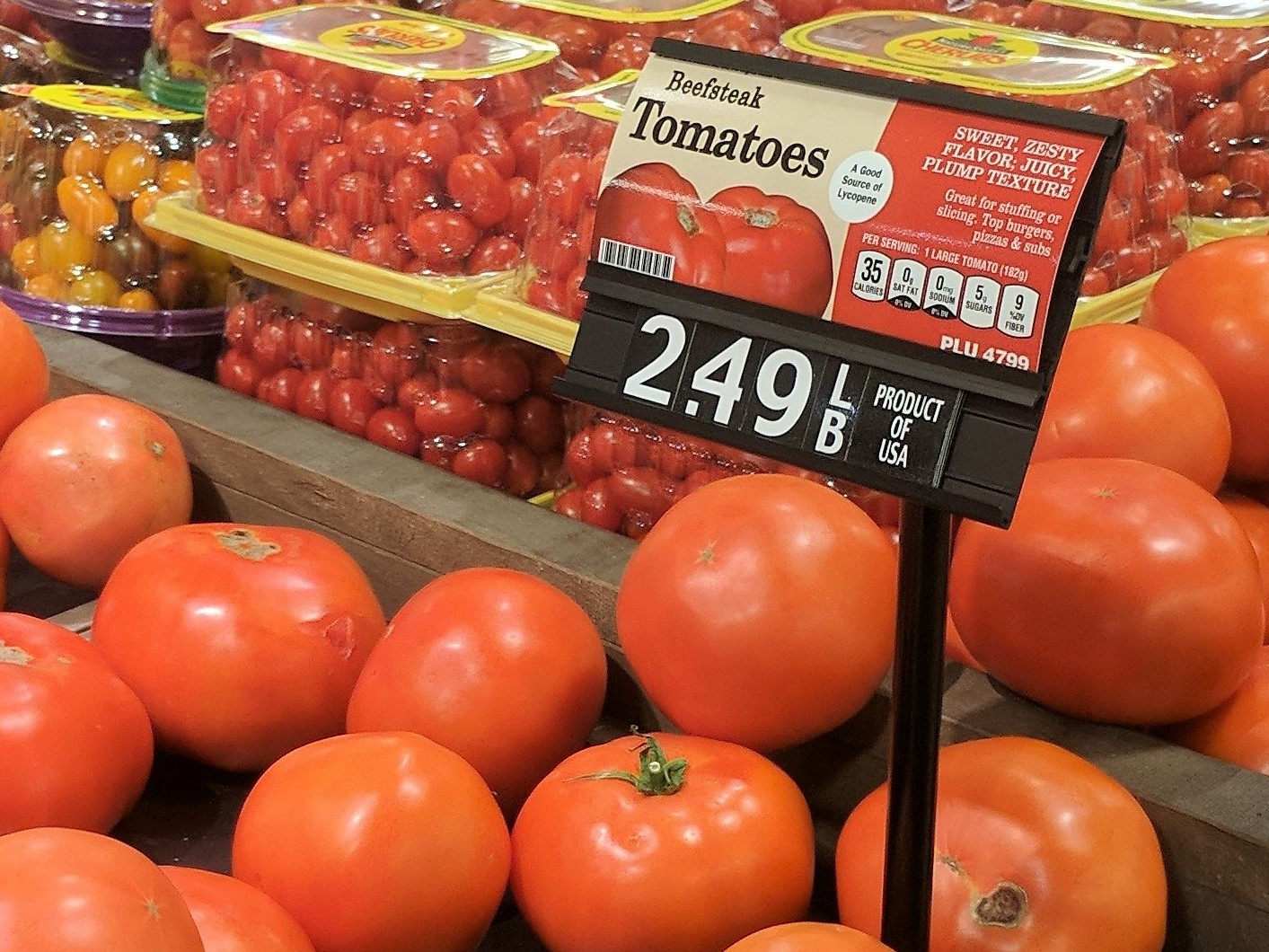
Tomatoes being sold by the pound in a ShopRite store in New Jersey

Loose fruit and vegetables are almost always priced per pound or per item, and meat is sold in ounces and pounds in both supermarkets and restaurants. Random-weight packages of meat and produce labeled with in-store scales are exempt from the metric labeling requirement. In some agricultural areas, pecks or bushels are used for dry volumes of produce such as apples.

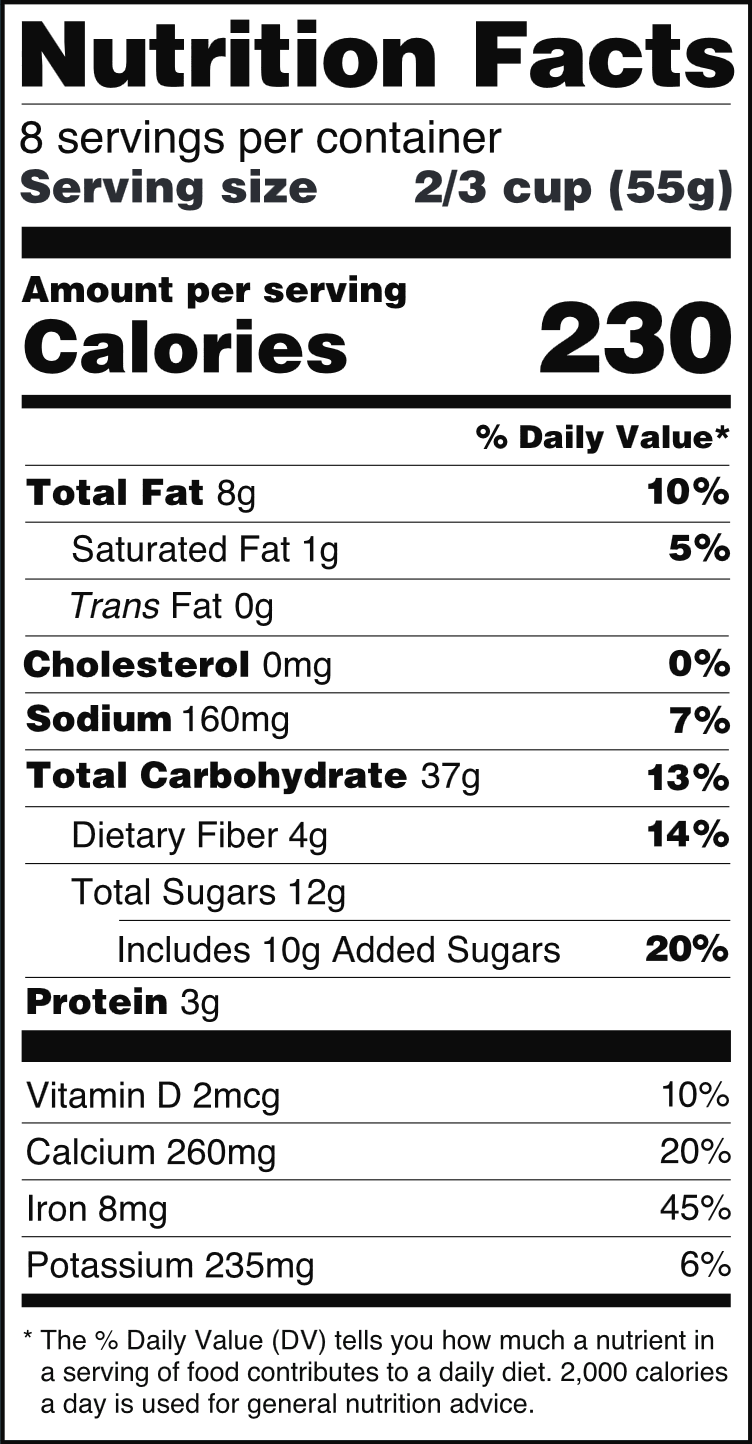
Sample U.S. Nutrition Facts label

Nutrition facts labels give serving sizes in both metric and U.S. customary units, but list individual nutrients only in grams or milligrams. For labeling purposes, a teaspoon is 5 mL, a tablespoon 15 mL, a cup 240 mL, 1 fl oz 30 mL, and 1 oz in weight 28 g.

Wine is sold in standard 750 mL bottles, as in the rest of the world. A "fifth" of liquor, once one-fifth of a U.S. gallon (757 mL), is now 750 mL, though the old name persists. Beer is sold in fluid ounces. Container sizes are regulated by the Alcohol and Tobacco Tax and Trade Bureau, and unlike non-alcoholic beverages, most alcohol products are not required to carry unit conversions.

==== Clothing and household goods ====
Clothing is sized in inches. American shoe sizes use different scales for children, men, and women, all derived from inches. Multinational brands such as Nike, Adidas, Hanes, and Levi's often sell the same stock worldwide with tags in both systems.

Mattress sizes use labels such as king, queen, full, and twin, defined in inches rather than the metric dimensions used for similar labels elsewhere. The FPLA requires bed sheets to state the bed type they fit as well as dimensions in centimeters and inches, and requires dual units on many other woven goods such as towels.

==== Water ====
Residential water use is billed in either gallons or hundreds of cubic feet (CCF), the latter being the most common unit among water utilities. Reusable water bottles are sold in fluid ounces or liters. Ounce sizes are typically multiples of 8, such as 32 and 40 fl oz, which are close to the common 1-liter and 1.2-liter sizes.

=== Science and medicine ===
==== Science ====
Metric use in science is essentially universal, with specialized units such as the parsec and light year used in particular fields, as elsewhere in the world. U.S. laboratories almost exclusively use SI units, including the kelvin and degree Celsius for temperature. NASA also works almost entirely in metric. In early 2007 it announced that it would use metric units for all operations on the lunar surface when it returned to the Moon. That program was canceled in 2010, and was replaced by the Artemis program in 2017.

In the United States, irrigation engineers commonly work in acre-feet and cubic feet per second, where engineers elsewhere use gigaliters and cubic meters per second.

Meteorology uses both systems. The United States adopted the international METAR code on July 1, 1996, but filed national exceptions to its metric units: wind speeds are reported in knots rather than meters per second, visibility in statute miles, cloud heights in feet, and altimeter settings in inches of mercury rather than hectopascals. Only temperature and dew point are reported in degrees Celsius. Precipitation is reported in hundredths of an inch. Most synoptic charts use SI units apart from wind speed. Atmospheric vorticity is typically measured in full rotations per 100,000 seconds rather than the SI-recommended radian.

==== Medicine ====
The medical field uses predominantly metric units, although height and weight are usually discussed with patients in customary units.

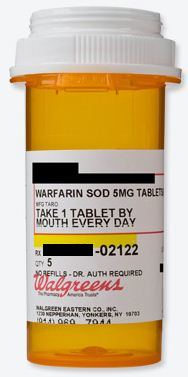
A container which held 5 mg prescription pill capsules

===== Pharmacology =====
Prescription and non-prescription pill dosages are always given in SI units, most commonly milligrams, with micrograms for smaller doses. Because the prefix μ (mu) is unfamiliar to many Americans and missing from most keyboards, the abbreviation mcg is used for micrograms. In handwritten prescriptions this also avoids "μg" being misread as "mg", which could cause a thousandfold dosing error.

Vitamin content was long given in gram-based units or WHO-standardized international units (IU). Under the FDA's 2016 labeling rules, vitamins A, D and E must now be declared in micrograms or milligrams, although IU may still appear alongside.

Liquid medications were long labeled in both milliliters and teaspoons or tablespoons, standardized as 5 and 15 mL. Because many people treat ordinary cutlery as teaspoons and tablespoons, a 2015 American Academy of Pediatrics policy statement found that spoon-based instructions encouraged dosing with uncalibrated kitchen utensils and called for milliliter-only dosing. Given this and confusion between the abbreviations TSP and TBSP, the FDA and the National Council for Prescription Drug Programs now recommend milliliter-only dosing instructions, with a milliliter-graduated dosing device supplied with liquid medications.

===== Concentrations and bloodwork =====
Dosage guidelines are given in milligrams per kilogram of body weight. The metric units used for test results sometimes differ from those used elsewhere. U.S. diabetes mellitus patients, for example, measure blood sugar in milligrams per deciliter (as with cholesterol and other blood concentrations), where most other countries use millimoles per liter. American glucose meters can switch between the two.

Blood and urine samples are taken by the milliliter, and intravenous therapy is dispensed by the milliliter. To avoid confusion, a 1-liter bag is labeled "1000 mL".

===== Height and weight =====
Clinics often record height in centimeters, and body mass index is expressed in kg/m^{2} even when calculated from pounds and inches. Even where a practice records height and weight in SI units, they are almost always discussed with the patient in customary units. Exercise is usually discussed in miles walked, while intake of sugar, sodium, and other nutrients is discussed in grams and milligrams.

===== Dentistry and blood pressure =====
Tooth positions, tooth movement, and periodontal (gum health) charts are measured in millimeters. Blood pressure is measured in millimeters of mercury.

=== Technology and energy ===
==== Electronics ====
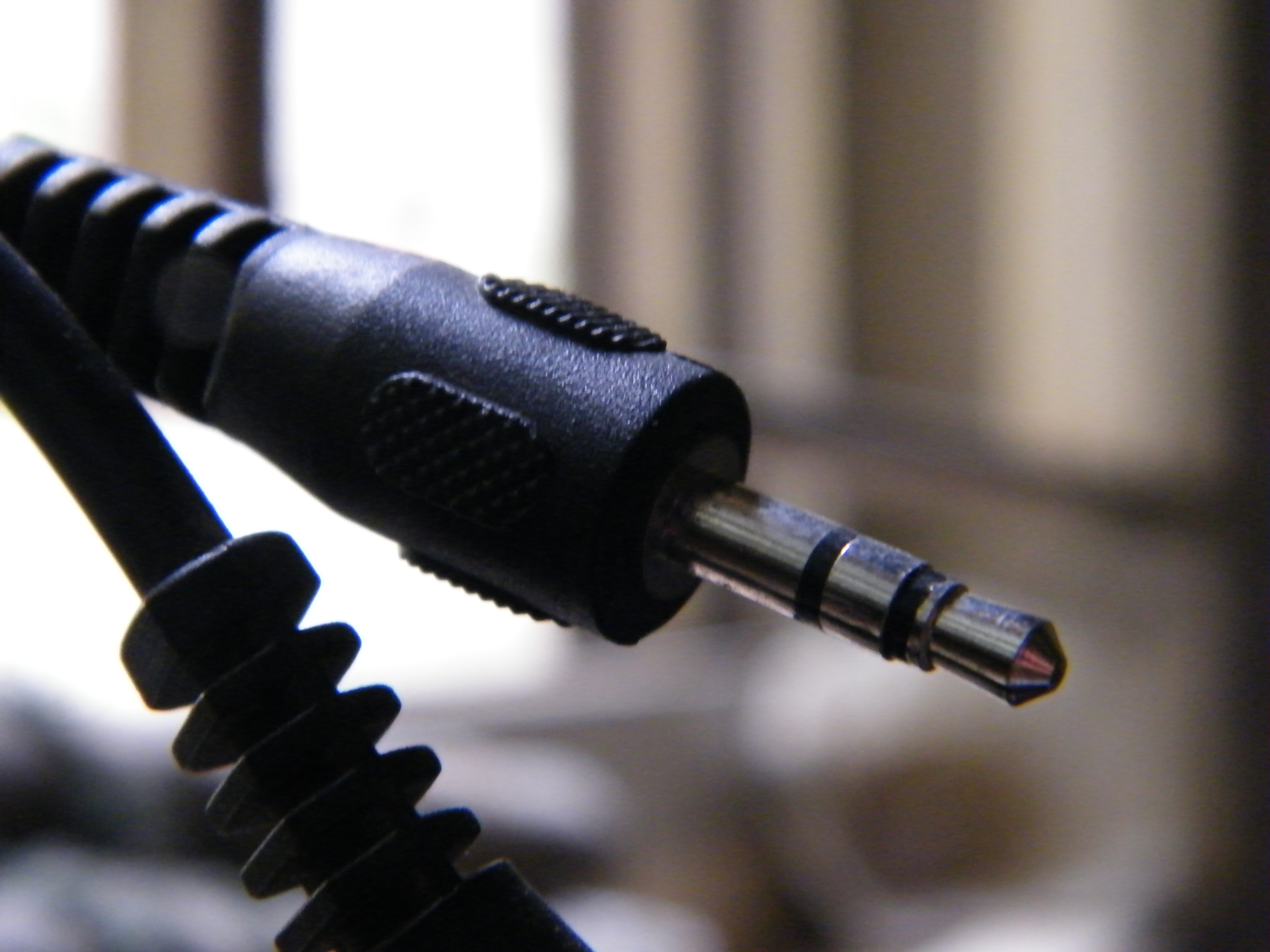
A 3.5 mm headphone connector

Display sizes for televisions and monitors are advertised in inches (measured diagonally), though most boxes also give the size in centimeters. The original 1/4-inch (6.35 mm) phone connector dates back to 1878 and is still used in audio equipment and electric instruments, but has largely been superseded by 3.5 mm connectors and the 2.5 mm headset jack once common on mobile phones.

Early floppy disks had a nominal size of 5 1/4 inches (about 130 mm), while the "3 1/2 inch" disks that replaced them were actually designed at 90 mm. CDs and DVDs are 120 mm in diameter, and mini CDs are sometimes called 80 mm CDs. Computer case fans are sized in millimeters (120 mm or 80 mm, for example), while hard disk drive and optical drive bays keep their inch names (3 1/2 and 5 1/4 inches) even though the actual dimensions differ. A 3 1/2-inch bay is about 4 inches (101.6 mm) wide, because the name refers to the platter diameter. The newer 2 1/2-inch and 1.8-inch drive bays are specified in metric and use metric screws, and M.2 SSDs are named by their dimensions in millimeters (an "M.2 2280" is 22 mm wide and 80 mm long). CPU temperature sensors report in Celsius.

Consumer photographic film is commonly 35 mm (a 24×36 mm negative), though print sizes and large format films are given in inches. Digital camera sensor sizes use an archaic inch-fraction system based on the diameter of an equivalent vidicon tube, so a 1/(1.6 in) sensor is larger than a 1/(2.5 in) one. Lens focal lengths are given in millimeters.

The weight of vinyl phonograph records is given in grams, and turntable tracking force and anti-skating settings in grams-force.

==== Electricity and energy ====
There are no customary units for electric current, potential difference, or charge, because these concepts were developed after science had adopted metric units internationally. The ampere, volt, ohm, and coulomb are the only units used, and the hertz has replaced cycles per second.

Energy is measured in watt hours (SI-based), calories (metric but not SI), or BTUs and therms (customary), and only rarely in the SI joule. Residential and commercial electricity is metered and billed in kilowatt hours, as in most metric countries. Force is usually measured in pounds rather than newtons, and torque in pound-feet. Fuel prices are mostly given per gallon, barrel, thousand cubic feet, or short or long ton. Heating, cooling, and combustion are often measured in BTUs per hour or refrigeration tons, and power plant efficiency is often expressed as a "heat rate" in BTU per kilowatt hour. Engines, electric motors, and power plant steam turbines are frequently rated in horsepower, while power plant output is generally expressed in megawatts.

==== Sound ====
Accurate sound level meters were not invented until after the microphone, by which time SI units dominated physics. Although sound pressure could in theory be given in pounds per square inch, this is virtually never done, and the international decibel scale is standard. Where a non-logarithmic scale is wanted, the related sone is used; bathroom and kitchen ventilation fans, for example, are rated in sones. Hearing protection must be labeled with its decibel reduction, with detailed charts showing reduction at given hertz frequencies.

=== Industry and trade ===
==== Manufacturing ====
Globalization of manufacturing has led to wide, though not universal, adoption of metric standards. General Motors began converting to metric fasteners in 1973, and after a long period in which cars were assembled with both customary and metric fasteners, American vehicles are now built largely to metric standards. Engines were once named for their displacement in cubic inches; the Chrysler "426 Hemi" would now be described as a 7-liter engine. Technical publications and American automakers often give displacement in both cubic inches and cubic centimeters or liters. The Dodge SRT-8 6.1 L Hemi, for example, is specified as 370 cubic inches (6,100 cm^{3}).

==== Construction ====
Construction remains overwhelmingly customary. Dimensional lumber comes in nominal inch cross-sections with lengths in feet. Although model building codes such as the International Building Code give both customary and metric units, local amendments and zoning codes are often customary only. Because of Canada's proximity, mismatched units still cause problems across the border. The pattern is similar to Japan, an otherwise metric country where traditional construction still uses Japanese units.

==== Commodities and finance ====
Some market prices, mainly for raw materials, are quoted in customary units, such as barrels of oil, troy ounces of gold, and pounds of frozen pork bellies. The federal government reports international production in metric units (such as metric tons of wheat) but domestic production in bushels. Gemstones and pearls are sold in metric carats.

=== Transportation ===
==== Roads ====
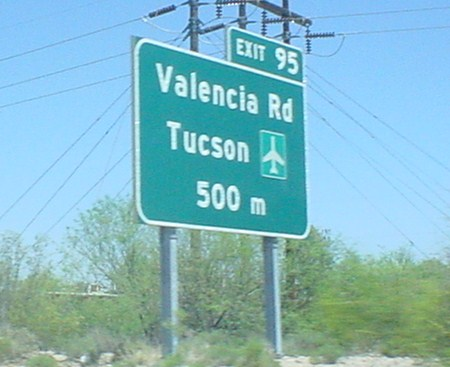
"Valencia Road, Tucson Airport: 500 m" on Interstate 19

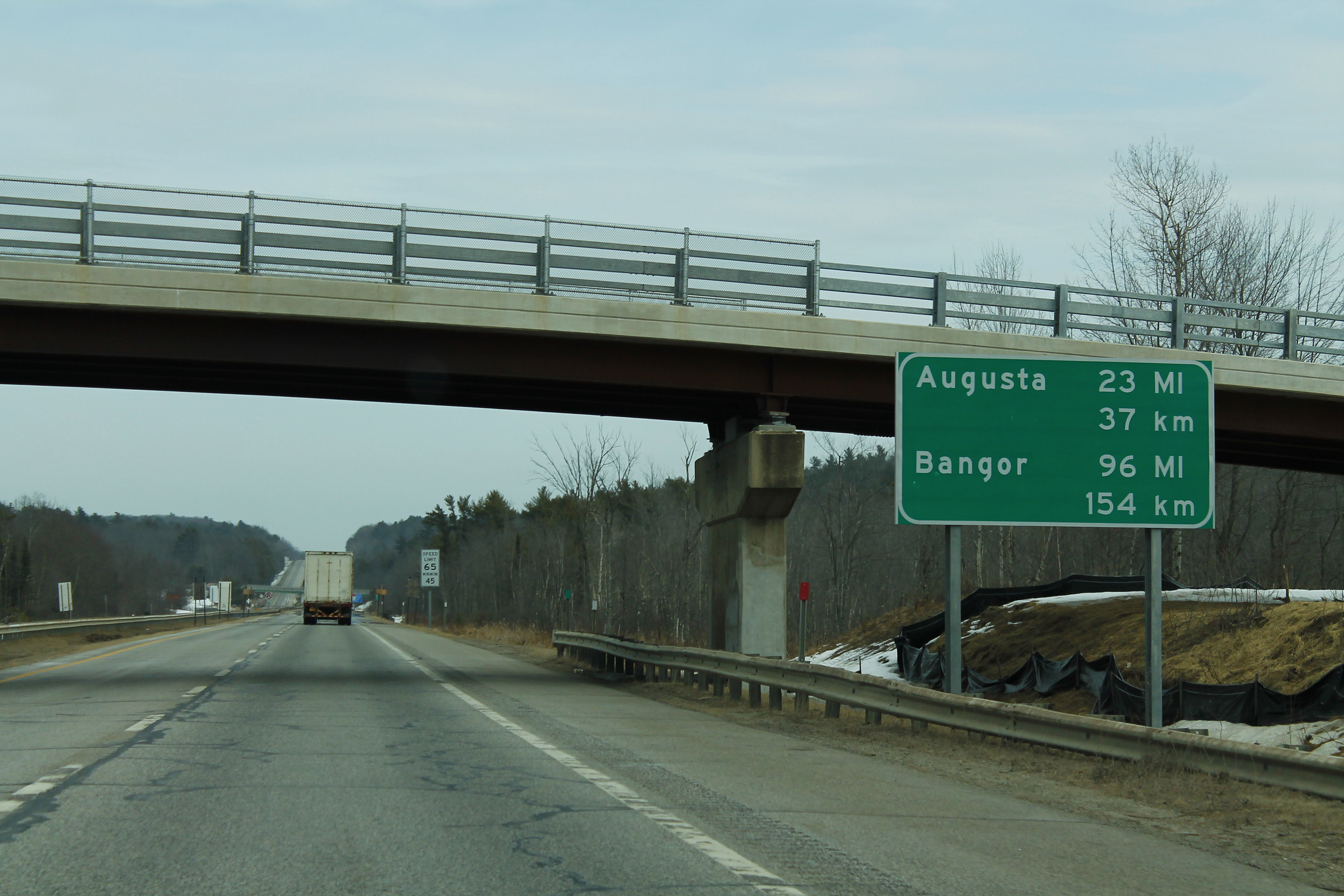
Mileage sign displaying both miles and kilometers on Interstate 95 in Maine

Speed limits are posted in miles per hour and distances are mostly shown in miles, yards, or feet. A few dual mile and kilometer signs survive, mostly from demonstration projects that are no longer supported. The first metric signs on a U.S. Interstate highway were posted on February 12, 1973, on Interstate 71 in Ohio.

Interstate 19 in Arizona is signed almost entirely in metric except for speed limits, though signs are being converted back to customary units as they are replaced. The turnpike section of Delaware Route 1 was built with a kilometer-based system in anticipation of a mid-1990s national conversion that never happened. Its distances were changed to miles in 1995 and standard mile markers were added in 2003, but its exit numbers from Dover Air Force Base north to Interstate 95 remain metric.

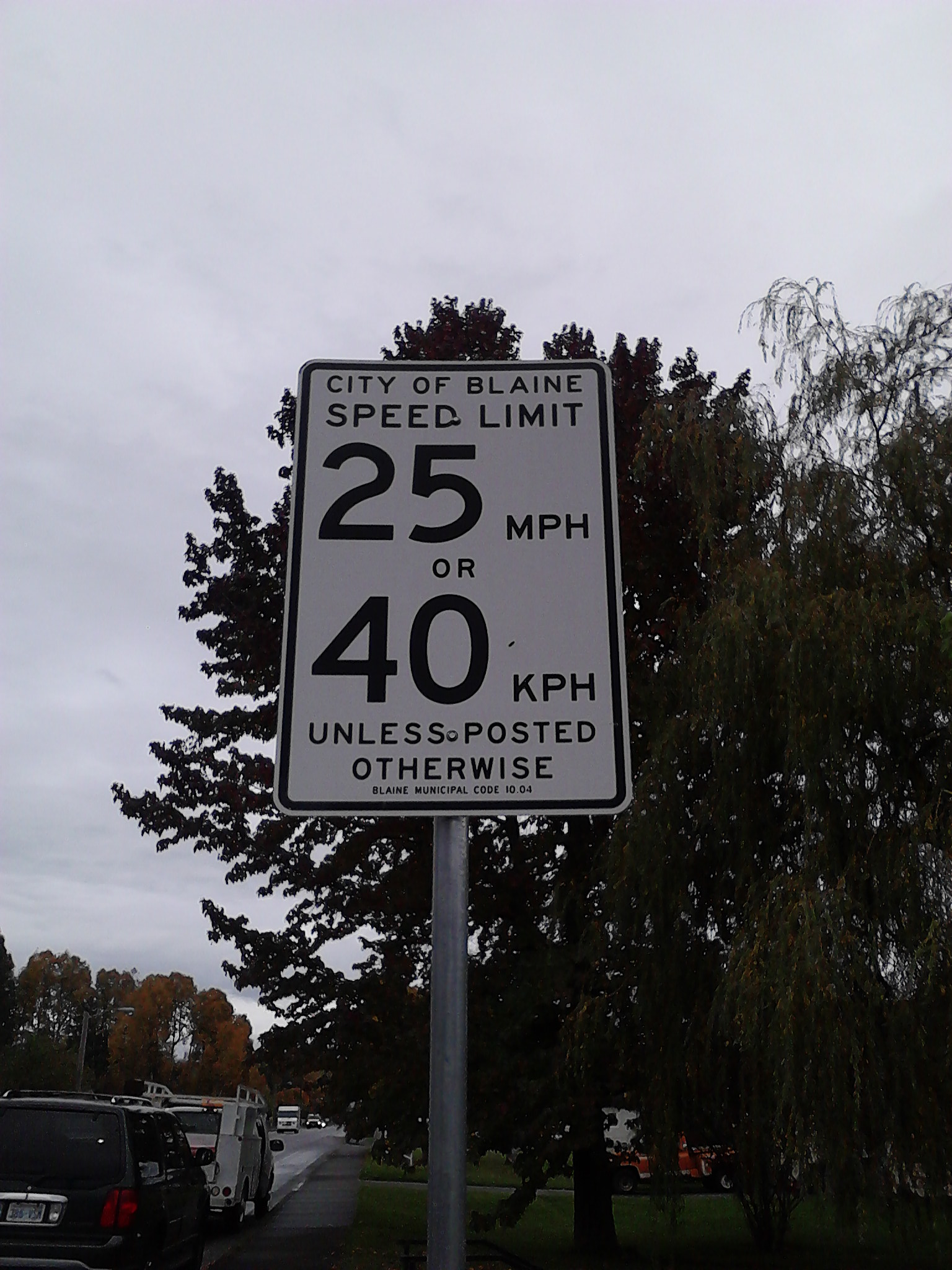
Speed limit signs in both mph and km/h in Blaine, Washington

Newer state highway signs on Kauaʻi show distances in both miles and kilometers. On the island of Hawaii, mile markers show both units where a whole kilometer roughly matches a whole mile (such as 5 mi/8 km). In Houston, Texas, many speed limit signs near Bush Intercontinental and Hobby airports and the Texas Medical Center have km/h signs beneath them. Puerto Rico uses American-style signs with kilometer posts and distances in kilometers, but speed limits in miles per hour. The Maine Turnpike once showed metric distances alongside customary ones for Canadian tourists, but since 2017 new and replacement signs show miles only.

The 2000, 2003, and 2004 editions of the Manual on Uniform Traffic Control Devices (MUTCD) used both metric and customary units and included metric signs, such as km/h speed limits with black circles around the numbers and yellow "Metric" plates on other regulatory signs, though these were not normally used and there was no plan to convert. The 2009 edition removed metric signs and measurements, replacing them with an appendix of conversion tables. By contrast, in the largely metric United Kingdom, metric distances on road signs are prohibited by law, while width and height restrictions are shown in both systems and weight limits in tonnes.

Gasoline and diesel are sold by the U.S. gallon, and fuel economy is rated in miles per gallon, where most metric countries use liters per 100 kilometers (the European Union standard) or kilometers per liter. Gasoline is dispensed in liters in Puerto Rico and in Point Roberts, Washington, an exclave reachable by road only through Canada, where some stations advertise prices in both Canadian and U.S. dollars. Engine oil is sold by the quart, antifreeze by the gallon, brake fluid by the fluid ounce, and air conditioning refrigerant by the ounce (mass). Wiper blades are sized in inches.

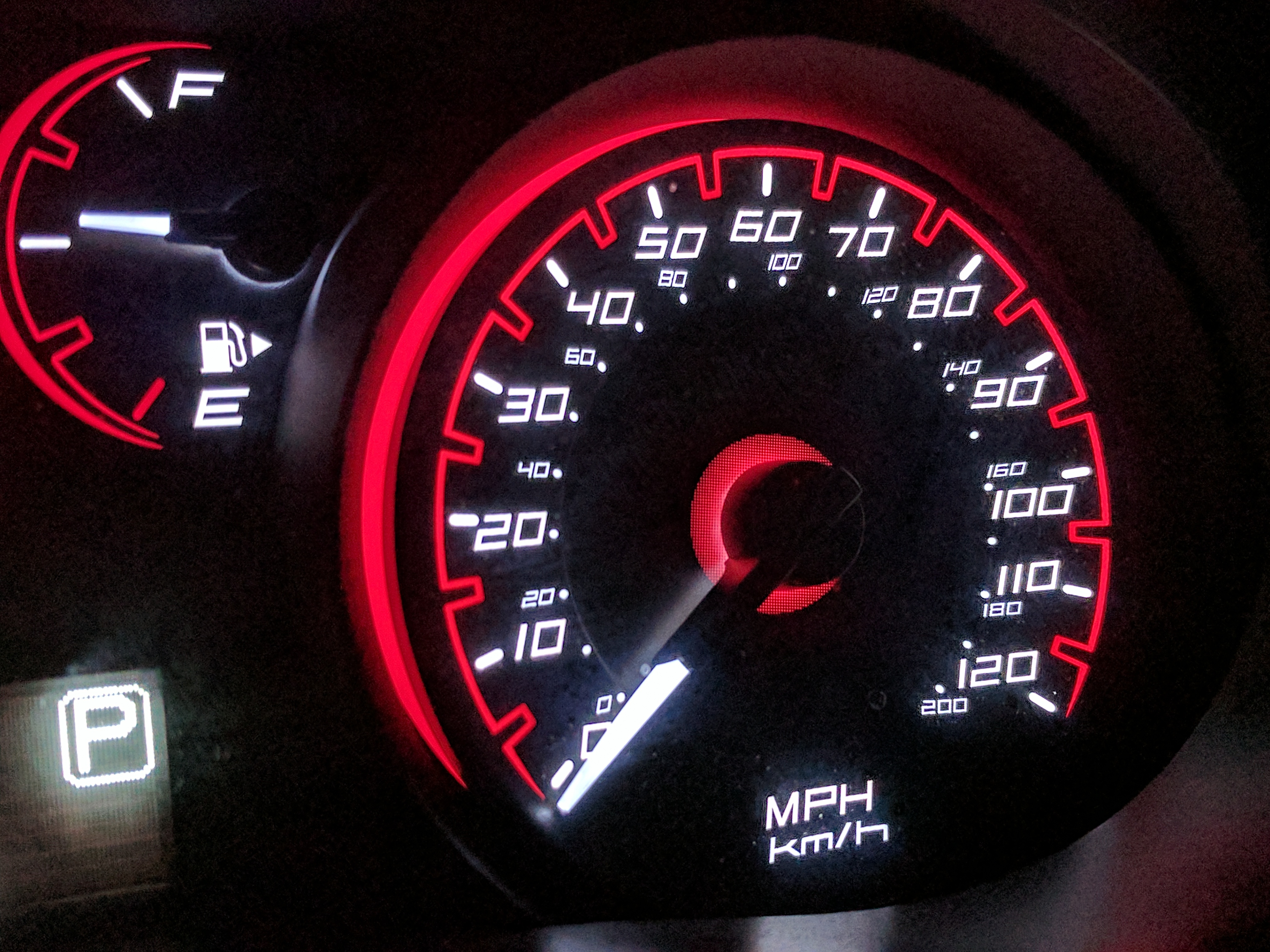
MPH and smaller km/h values on speedometer

Federal Motor Vehicle Safety Standard 101 permits speedometers to show miles per hour alone or both mph and km/h. In practice, most U.S.-market vehicles have mile odometers and dual speedometers with mph as the primary scale, and digital speedometers can usually be switched. Odometers may record miles or kilometers but must be clearly labeled.

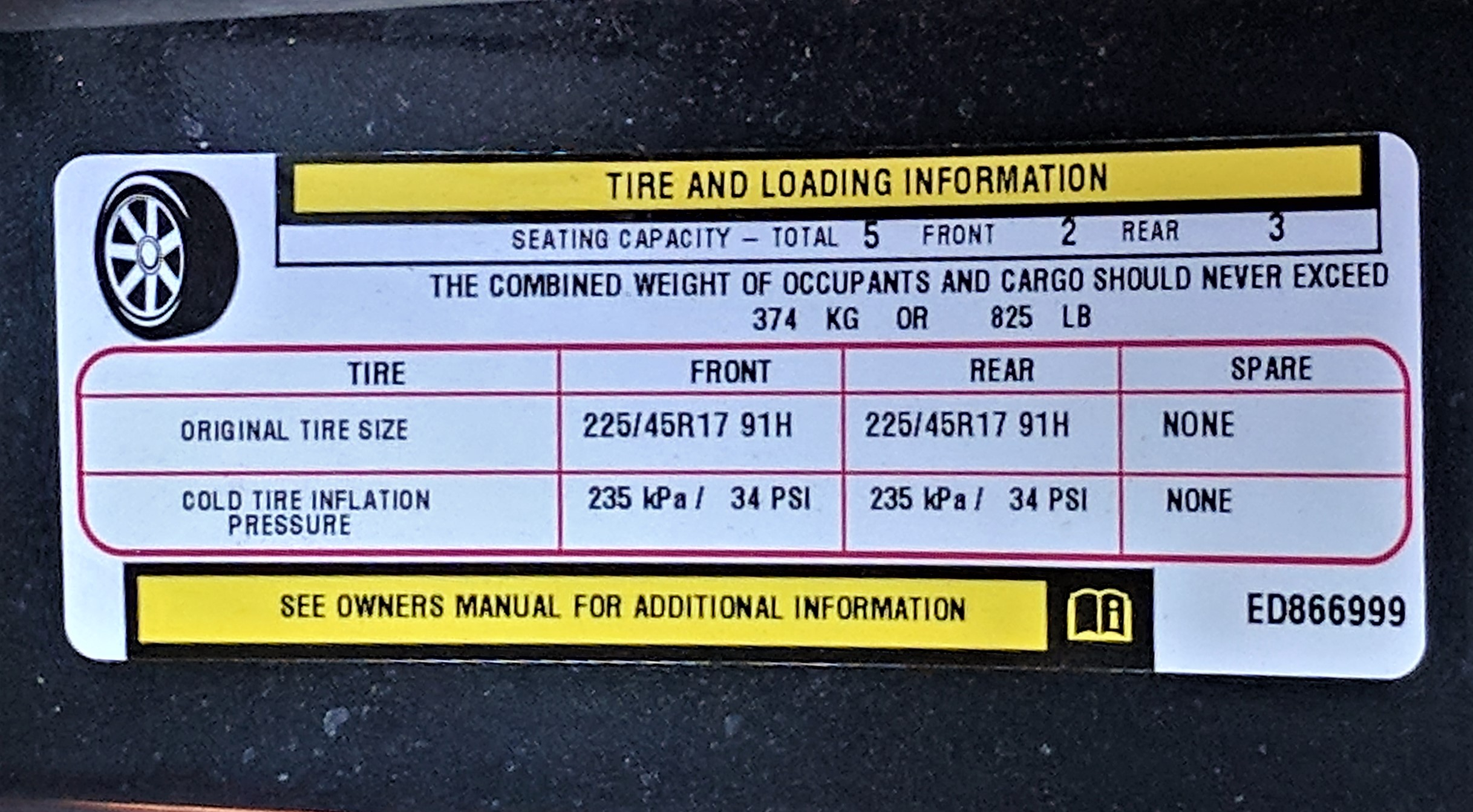
Vehicle capacity sticker

Passenger car tires are typically inflated to about 30 pounds per square inch (207 kPa), and both values are shown on the tire. Since model year 2006, a standardized "Tire and Loading Information" sticker has been required, giving capacities in SI units followed by customary equivalents. Elevator and cable car speeds are commonly given in meters per second.

The long-distance trail Mid State Trail has used metric units exclusively in its trail guide since 1973, giving distances in kilometers and elevations in meters.

==== Aviation ====
Aircraft altitudes are measured in feet in the United States, as in most of the world, using an international system of flight levels; an airliner cruising at 36,000 feet is at Flight Level 360. China and North Korea are notable exceptions. Russia switched from metric to foot-based flight levels at high altitude in 2011 to avoid adjustments when crossing its airspace boundary. Speeds are given in knots and distances in nautical miles. The nautical mile is defined as exactly 1,852 meters (about 6,076 feet), close to one minute of arc of latitude.

Temperatures in aviation weather reports are given in degrees Celsius, and pilots use Celsius for cold-weather altitude corrections at U.S. airports.

Frequent-flyer programs such as American Airlines' AAdvantage and Delta's SkyMiles are denominated in miles, and some international airlines that used kilometers have switched to miles, or use both, to simplify redemption with U.S. partners. U.S. airlines set baggage size and weight limits in customary units, while international airlines flying to the U.S. often use metric limits. The Transportation Security Administration limits carry-on liquids to 3.4 fluid ounces (100 mL). It originally planned a 3 oz (89 mL) limit but changed to 3.4 oz after pressure from the European Union.

==== Maritime and rail ====
Nautical charts show depth in fathoms and distance in nautical miles. The international nautical mile of 1,852 meters was agreed internationally in 1929 and adopted by the United States in 1954, replacing the older U.S. nautical mile of about 1,853.25 meters. Railroads use the standard gauge of 4 feet 8 1/2 inches, as does most of Europe, where it is expressed as 1,435 mm.

=== Military and firearms ===
The U.S. military uses metric measurements extensively to ensure interoperability with allies, particularly under NATO Standardization Agreements (STANAG). Ground forces have measured distances in kilometers, often called "klicks", since 1918. Most military firearm calibers have been metric since the M14 was introduced in 1957, with a few legacy exceptions such as .50-caliber guns, and military vehicles are generally built to metric standards. Heavy weapon calibers are given in millimeters, but aircraft ordnance is normally measured in pounds. The U.S. Navy is an exception: its guns are measured in inches, and its submarine fleet measures range in "kiloyards" (914.4 m), depth in feet, and some velocities in feet per second. The Navy and Air Force measure distance in nautical miles and speed in knots, and, as in civil aviation, NATO air forces use feet for altitude.

Civilian and law enforcement firearms use both inch and millimeter calibers. Cartridges designed in the United States were traditionally named by caliber in inches (such as the .45 Colt and .270 Winchester). Because many cartridges share a caliber, bullet diameter is often used instead to distinguish them, and the number in a name may only approximate the true diameter: the .220 Swift, .223 Remington and .222 Remington Magnum all fire .224-inch-diameter (5.7 mm) bullets. The international arms trade has also brought metric calibers into common civilian use, such as 6 mm and 7 mm rifles and 9 mm and 10 mm handguns. These are named either in millimeters, as with the 7mm Remington Magnum, or by converting to inches, as with the .243 Winchester. The military uses metric names even for rounds derived from inch designs, such as 7.62×51 mm rather than .308 and 5.56 mm rather than .223. Major U.S. handloading manuals use customary units throughout, even for European-designed metric cartridges.

=== Sports ===
The Olympic Trials in track and field have always used metric distances. The national championships switched to metric in 1974, although USA Track & Field recorded the high jump in customary units until 2002. The National Collegiate Athletic Association (NCAA) switched at its national championship level in 1976, and the National Federation of State High School Associations followed in 1980. Field events such as the shot put, high jump, and discus throw are still often measured in feet and inches below national and international level. In 2017, the Florida High School Athletic Association became the first to switch its field events to metric.

Road races are usually run over metric distances such as the 5K run, though the mile remains popular and 5 and 10 km courses usually have mile markers rather than kilometer markers. The marathon is referred to as a 26.2-mile race rather than 42.195 km. Ultramarathons use either miles or kilometers.

The playing areas of most major team sports are defined in customary units. The American football field is divided into yards, and many of the sport's key statistics are in yards. Baseball parks, basketball and tennis courts, and ice hockey rinks are measured in feet, golf courses in yards, auto racing tracks and race lengths in miles, and horse racing in furlongs. A novelty metric American football game between Carleton College and St. Olaf College was played in September 1977 on a field 100 meters long, but the idea did not catch on.

Common swimming pool lengths are 25 yards, 25 meters, and 50 meters. The Olympic-size swimming pool is specified only in meters, while high schools and the NCAA compete in 25-yard pools. USA Swimming clubs typically compete in 25-yard pools in winter and 50-meter pools in summer.

Some equipment, such as skis and poles, is sold in metric sizes. Road bike wheels are labeled "700c", a French designation based on a nominal 700 mm outer diameter, while mountain bike wheels are sold in inches (26, 27.5, or 29) even though all are specified internationally by their bead seat diameter in millimeters. Competitive Ultimate discs are standardized in millimeters and grams. USA Weightlifting, as a member of the International Weightlifting Federation, uses metric weights in competition, but most gyms label weights in pounds.

=== Hybrid units ===
Some measurements combine customary and metric units. For example:

- Power plant heat rate: BTU/kWh
- Federal vehicle exhaust emission standards: grams per mile
- Caffeine in beverages: milligrams per fluid ounce
- Tire sizes: millimeters for width and inches for wheel diameter
- Lighting: bulb diameters in eighths of an inch and fluorescent tube lengths in inches, but sockets in millimeters (the standard "medium Edison screw" is E26). Small globe Christmas lights are often sized in millimeters (G30 and G40), and miniature LED T1 3/4 (7/32-inch) bulbs are sometimes called M5 (5 mm; not to be confused with M5 thread).
- Electrical conductors: resistance in ohms per thousand feet, as in Table 8, chapter 9 of the National Electrical Code Handbook (8th ed.)

Some customary units are also combined with metric prefixes. Submarine target ranges are given in kiloyards, telephone line lengths in kilofeet, and in structural engineering and architecture, large loads are measured in kips (1,000 pounds-force) rather than the short tons-force used in other non-metric industries.

== Public opinion ==
Public support for conversion has been consistently low. A 1977 Gallup poll found that 60% of Americans who knew what the metric system was opposed adopting it, and a 2016 poll found that only 32% wanted the country to go metric. In a YouGov survey, 88% of Americans said they would give a person's height in feet and inches and 87% would describe distances in miles, though adults under 45 were considerably more likely than older Americans to use metric units.

== Cultural impact ==
The continued use of customary units has led writers of fiction set in the future to make varying assumptions. Many assume the United States and humanity generally will use metric units. Others use customary units, either deliberately for American audiences or by accident. The 1966 series Star Trek initially used customary units despite its 23rd-century setting and international crew, switching inconsistently to metric from "The Changeling" onwards. Later series such as Star Trek: The Next Generation and Star Trek: Enterprise used metric exclusively.

A Saturday Night Live sketch, "Decabet", made at the height of the metrication movement, lampooned metric measurements by introducing a ten-letter alphabet. In the 1994 film Pulp Fiction, Vincent Vega explains that in Paris a Quarter Pounder with Cheese is called a "Royale with Cheese" because of the metric system. The metric system and American attitudes toward it have also been running jokes in The Simpsons, Futurama and The Big Bang Theory. In 2023, the Saturday Night Live sketch "Washington's Dream", with host Nate Bargatze as George Washington rallying his troops with a vision of the nation's future weights and measures, satirized the customary system. It became one of the season's most-watched sketches and was followed by a sequel in 2024.

Popular Science's September 2003 issue listed NIST's "Metric System Advocate" among the "Worst Jobs in Science".

== See also ==
- Frank Mankiewicz
- The Metric Marvels
- Metrication opposition
- Metrication in Canada
- Metrication in the United Kingdom
- Mendenhall Order
- Lyn Nofziger
- Plan for Establishing Uniformity in the USA, 1790 report including proposal for decimal system based on the foot
- United States customary units
- United States Public Land Survey System
- US Metric Association
