= USMA (disambiguation) =

USMA most commonly refers to the United States Military Academy, a four-year federal service academy in West Point, New York.

USMA may also refer to:

- Universidad Católica Santa María La Antigua, a private university in Panama City, Panama
- US Metric Association, a non-profit organization that advocates for total conversion of the United States to the International System of Units
- USM Alger, a football club based in the city of Algiers
