= Two-liter bottle =

Container for soft drinks, beer and wine

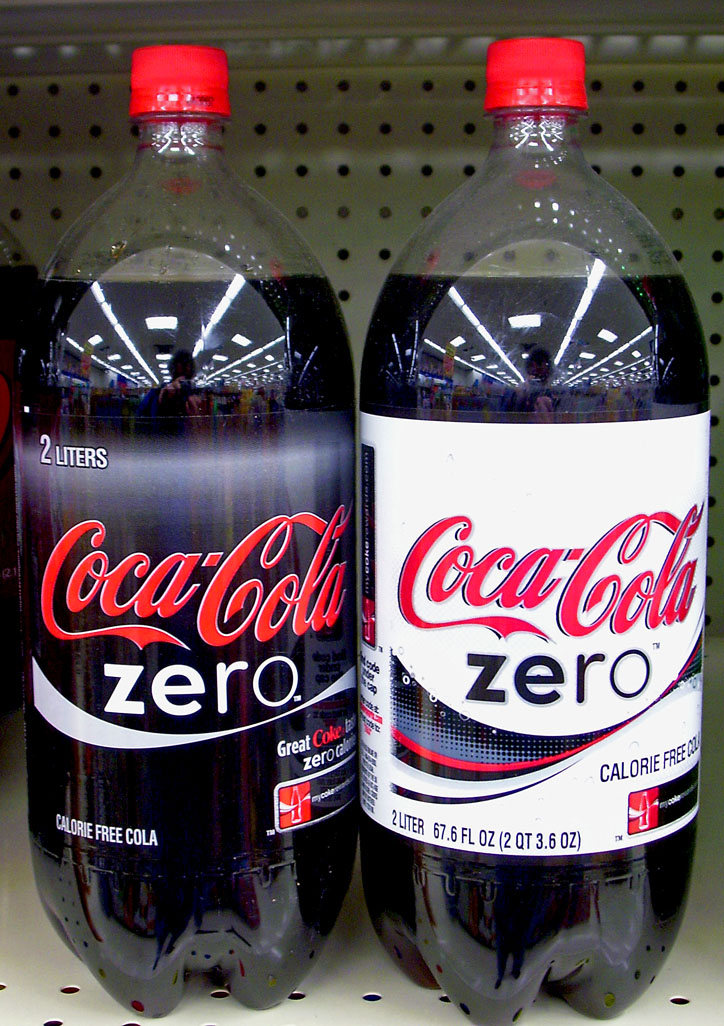
US market Coke Zero bottles, showing 2 L (70.4 imp fl oz; 67.6 US fl oz) with US Customary conversion.

The two-liter bottle is a common container for soft drinks, beer, and wine. These bottles are produced from polyethylene terephthalate, also known as PET plastic, or glass using the blow molding process. Bottle labels consist of a printed, tight-fitted plastic sleeve. A resealable screw-top allows the contents to be used at various times while retaining carbonation.

In the United States, the two-liter bottle is one of the few cases where a product is sold by a round number of metric units. Since very few other beverages are sold in this exact quantity, the term "two-liter" in American English almost invariably refers to a soft drink bottle. Other common metric sizes for plastic soft drink bottles include 500 milliliters, 1 liter, and 3 liters.

== History ==
PepsiCo introduced the first two-liter sized soft drink bottle in 1970. Motivated by market research conducted by new marketing vice president John Sculley (who would later be known for heading Apple Inc. from 1983 to 1993), the bottle and the method of its production were designed by a team led by Nathaniel Wyeth of DuPont, who received the patent in 1973. In 1985, a three-liter bottle appeared on supermarket shelves. The design is still used to this day by some bottlers.

Most modern-day two-liter bottles are one piece of PET (polyethylene terephthalate) with a base that is molded with a radial corrugation to provide strength for the bottom and the ability to stand upright. Most early two-liters had a separate opaque base glued to the hemispherical bottom of the clear PET flask. This base had a coaxial corrugation and drain holes.

== Recycling ==
Used two-liter bottles see new life in a variety of uses including carpeting, boat hulls, polyester fabric, filling for jackets, sleeping bags, mattresses, pillows, recycling bins, artificial floating islands, scouring pads, and, on an increasing scale, new soft drink bottles.

== Specifications ==
Typical dimensions:

- Height: 300 to 330 mm (12 to 13 in)
- Diameter: 100 to 120 mm (3.9 to 4.7 in)

== See also ==
- Container deposit legislation
- Metrication in the United States
- Plastic bottle
