= Metric Today =

Metric Today is the bi-monthly newsletter of the US Metric Association. It features the latest developments in US metrication efforts. It has been published continuously since 1966, and is distributed to each member of the US Metric Association as a benefit of membership. In the spirit of international standardization, it is published in the dimensions of the A4 paper size.
