= A Metric America =

1971 book by the United States National Bureau of Standards

- Author: National Bureau of Standards
- Language: English
- Genre: Non-fiction
- Publisher: Government Printing Office
- Publication date: 1971
- Publication place: United States

A Metric America: A Decision Whose Time Has Come was a 1971 book by the United States National Bureau of Standards (now the National Institute of Standards and Technology) printed by the Government Printing Office.

In 1968, in the Metric Study Act (Pub. L. 90-472, August 9, 1968, 82 Stat. 693), Congress authorized a three-year study of systems of measurement in the U.S., with particular emphasis on the feasibility of adopting the SI. This detailed U.S. Metric Study was conducted by the Department of Commerce. A 45-member advisory panel consulted with and took testimony from hundreds of consumers, business organizations, labor groups, manufacturers, and state and local officials.

A Metric America: "A Decision Whose Time Has Come" – For Real (NISTIR 4858) was a June 1992 follow-up to this book.

== See also ==
- Metrication in the United States
