= Mendenhall Order =

1893 official standardization for metre-based systems of measurement in the USA

The Mendenhall Order marked a decision to change the fundamental standards of length and mass of the United States from the customary standards based on those of England to metric standards. It was issued on April 5, 1893, by Thomas Corwin Mendenhall, superintendent of the United States Coast and Geodetic Survey, with the approval of the United States Secretary of the Treasury, John Griffin Carlisle. The order was issued as the Survey's Bulletin No. 26 – Fundamental Standards of Length and Mass.

== Standards before the order ==
In October 1834, the United Kingdom Houses of Parliament were destroyed in a fire, and the British standards of length and mass were also destroyed. "When the new imperial standards to replace them were completed in 1855, two copies of the yard and one copy of the avoirdupois pound were presented to the United States". These were superior to the yard then in use, so one of them was adopted as the United States national standard yard. These yards were taken to England and re-compared with the imperial yard in 1876 and 1888. The pound provided by the United Kingdom agreed with the United States Mint pound, which remained the national standard according to Barbrow and Judson. Hockert claims the UK pound replaced the mint pound.

These were the fundamental standards for customary length and mass measurements in the United States, but the Office of Weights and Measures had other standards for metric measurements.

== Official recognition of the metric system ==
The Metric Act of 1866 was passed by Congress and allowed, but did not require, the use of the metric system. Included in the law was a table of conversion factors between the traditional and metric units. The United States Coast Survey (which in 1878 became the U.S. Coast and Geodetic Survey) Office of Weights and Measures had on hand a number of metric standards, and selected the iron Committee Meter and the platinum Arago Kilogram to be the national standards for metric measurement. The standard yard and pound previously mentioned continued to be the standards for customary measurements.

A series of conferences in France between 1870 and 1875 led to the signing of the Metre Convention and to the permanent establishment of the International Bureau of Weights and Measures, abbreviated BIPM after the French name. The BIPM made meter and kilogram standards for all the countries that signed the treaty; the two meters and two kilograms allocated to the United States arrived in 1890, and were adopted as national standards.

== Reasons for the change ==
The imperial standard yard of 1855 was found to be unstable and shortening by measurable amounts. Also, the mint pound was found to be "likewise unfit for use". For several years before the Mendenhall order was actually issued, the Office of Weights and Measures was "practically forced" to use the metric standards because of their superior stability, and because they were better designed for carrying out precision comparisons. The Office found that the conversion tables in the 1866 law were satisfactory and used them to derive customary length and mass from the metric standards. The conversions were 1 yard = 3600/3937 meter and 1 pound = 0.4535924277 kilogram. Therefore, the Mendenhall order amounted to a formal announcement of a change that had already occurred in practice.

Another motivation for the order was that later that year, in August 1893, an International Electrical Congress would be held in connection with the World's Fair in Chicago. Associated with the Congress would be a "Chamber of Delegates", officially organized for the purpose of coming to an international agreement on units of electrical quantities. As Mendenhall wrote,

In view of the probable success of this movement and of the certainty that such definitions would be built upon a metric foundation, it was deemed wise to have definite recognition of these national prototypes [of the meter and the kilogram] as the fundamental standards of reference in all metrological operations in which the United States Government was concerned.

== Refinement of the conversions ==
The definitions of 1893 remained unchanged for 66 years, but increasing precision in measurements gradually made the differences in the standards in use in English-speaking countries important. By the international yard and pound agreement of July 1, 1959, Australia, Canada, New Zealand, South Africa, the United Kingdom, and the United States agreed that 1 yard = 0.9144 meter and that 1 avoirdupois pound = 0.45359237 kilogram (but see U.S. survey foot).

== Standards versus systems ==
Mendenhall ordered that the standards used for the most accurate length and mass comparison change from certain yard and pound objects to certain meter and kilogram objects, but did not require anyone outside of the Office of Weights and Measures to change from the customary units to the metric system.

== See also ==
- Metric system in the United States
