= Metric Conversion Act =

U.S. federal statute of 1975

Metric Conversion Act of 1975
- Long title: An Act to declare a national policy of coordinating the increasing use of the metric system in the United States, and to establish a United States Metric Board to coordinate the voluntary conversion to the metric system
- Acronyms (colloquial): MCA
- Nicknames: Metric Conversion Act of 1975
- Enacted by: the 94th United States Congress
- Effective: December 23, 1975

Citations
- Public law: 94-168
- Statutes at Large: 89 Stat. 1007

Codification
- Titles amended: 15 U.S.C.: Commerce and Trade
- U.S.C. sections created: 15 U.S.C. ch. 6, subch. II § 205a et seq.

Legislative history
- Introduced in the House as H.R. 8674 by Olin E. Teague (D–TX) on July 16, 1975; Committee consideration by House Science and Technology Committee; Passed the House on September 5, 1975 (308-71); Passed the Senate on December 8, 1975 (passed, in lieu of S. 100) with amendment; House agreed to Senate amendment on December 11, 1975 (agreed); Signed into law by President Gerald Ford on December 23, 1975

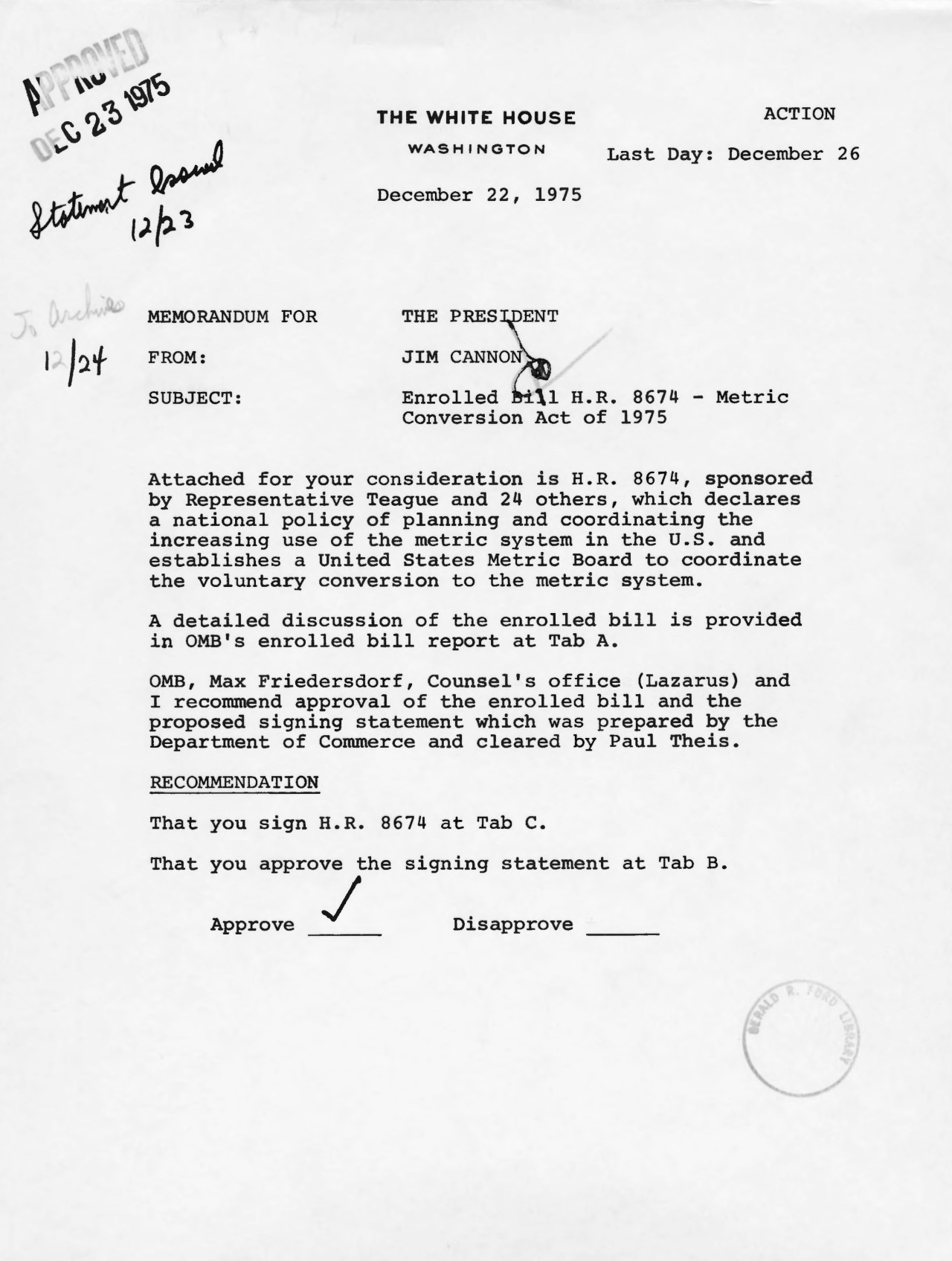
Metric Conversion Act of 1975 approved by President Gerald Ford

The Metric Conversion Act of 1975 is an act of Congress that was signed into law by U.S. president Gerald Ford on December 23, 1975. It declared the metric system "the preferred system of weights and measures for United States trade and commerce", but permitted the use of United States customary units in all activities. As Ford's statement on the signing of the act emphasizes, all conversion was to be "completely voluntary". The Act also established the United States Metric Board with representatives from scientific, technical, and educational institutions, as well as state and local governments to plan, coordinate, and educate the U.S. people for the metrication of the United States.

The Metric Board was abolished in 1982 by President Ronald Reagan, largely on the suggestion of Frank Mankiewicz and Lyn Nofziger.

Executive Order 12770, signed by President George H. W. Bush on July 25, 1991, directed departments and agencies within the executive branch of the United States Government to "take all appropriate measures within their authority" to use the metric system "as the preferred system of weights and measures for United States trade and commerce" and authorized the secretary of commerce "to charter an Interagency Council on Metric Policy ('ICMP'), which will assist the Secretary in coordinating Federal Government-wide implementation of this order."

== See also ==
- History of the metric system
- Omnibus Foreign Trade and Competitiveness Act of 1988
- US Metric Association
