= United States Metric Board =

Agency to encourage metrication, 1975–1982

- USMB

Agency overview
- Formed: December 23, 1975
- Dissolved: September 30, 1982
- Jurisdiction: Federal government of the United States
- Headquarters: Washington, D.C.
- Agency executive: Louis F. Polk, Chairman
- Parent agency: Executive Office of the President

The United States Metric Board (USMB) was a United States government agency set up to encourage metrication. The United States Metric Board was commissioned by the Metric Conversion Act of 1975 (15 U.S.C. 205d, enacted on December 23, 1975). The Metric Conversion Act of 1975 mandated the presidential appointment of seventeen members for the "independent instrumentality".

The board was composed of one member from the following agencies and/or related communities: engineers, scientists, the National Association of Manufacturers, the United States Chamber of Commerce, National Governors Conference, construction, National Conference on Weights and Measures, education, two members each from the AFL–CIO and small business, and four at-large members "to represent consumers", for a total of seventeen members in all.

The metrification assessment board existed from 1975 to 1982, ending when President Ronald Reagan abolished it, largely on the suggestion of Frank Mankiewicz and Lyn Nofziger.

== See also ==
- U.S. Metric Association
- Imperial and US customary measurement systems
