= Metric Act of 1866 =

United States legislation of 1866 concerning usage of the metric system

- Long title: An Act to authorize the Use of the Metric System of Weights and Measures
- Enacted by: the 39th United States Congress

Citations
- Statutes at Large: 14 Stat. 339 (1866)

Legislative history
- Passed the House on May 17, 1866; Passed the Senate on July 27, 1866; Signed into law by President Andrew Johnson on July 28, 1866

The Metric Act of 1866, also known as the Kasson Act, is a piece of United States legislation that legally protected use of the metric system in commerce from lawsuit, and provided an official conversion table from United States customary units.

== History ==
Congressman John A. Kasson from Iowa, then Chairman of the House Committee on Coinage, Weights, and Measures, proposed the act in his report of the Committee on Coinage, Weights, and Measures:

The metric system is already used in some arts and trades in this country, and is especially adapted to the wants of others. Some of its measures are already manufactured at Bangor, in Maine, to meet an existing demand at home and abroad. The manufacturers of the well-known Fairbanks scales state: “For many years we have had a large export demand for our scales with French weights, and the demand and sale is constantly increasing.” Its minute and exact divisions specially adapt it to the use of chemists, aphothecaries, the finer operations of the artisan, and to all scientific objects. It has always been and is now used in the United States coast survey. Yet in some of the States, owing to the phraseology of their laws, it would be a direct violation of them to use it in the business transactions of the community. It is therefore very important to legalize its use, and give to the people, or that portion of them desiring it, the opportunity for its legal employment, while the knowledge of its characteristics will be thus diffused among men. Chambers of commerce, boards of trade, manufacturing associations, and other voluntary societies, and individuals, will be induced to consider and in their discretion to adopt its use. The interests of trade among a people so quick as ours to receive and adopt a useful novelty, will soon acquaint practical men with its convenience. When this is attained—a period, it is hoped, not distant—a further act of Congress can fix a date for its exclusive adoption as a legal system. At an earlier period it may be safely introduced into all public offices, and for government service.

In the schedule of equivalents provided in the bill, extreme scientific accuracy is not expressed. The reasons follow. The exact length of the meter in inches and the weight of the kilogram in grains can of necessity be determined only approximately. The most careful determinations of these quantities now possible are liable to minute corrections hereafter, as more numerous observations are made and better instruments are used. Instead, therefore, of aiming at an accuracy greater, perhaps, than is attainable, it is more expedient to consult the convenience of the people by using the simplest numbers possible in the schedule, and yet such as shall be in fact more nearly exact than can ever be demanded in the ordinary business of life. These numbers are to be used in schools, and in practical life millions of times as multipliers and divisors, and every unnecessary additional figure is justly objectionable.

In a popular sense of the word, however, the numbers in the schedule may be said to be exact. The length of the meter, for example, is given as 39.37 inches. The mean of the best English and the best American determinations differs from this only by about the amount by which the standard bar changes its length by a change of one degree of temperature. Such accuracy is certainly sufficient for legal purposes and for popular use.

The Act was originally introduced as H.R. 596 in the 39th Congress. The House passed it on 17 May 1866; the Senate passed it on July 27, 1866; and it was presented to President Andrew Johnson and signed into law the following day on July 28, 1866.

== Metric Weights and Measures ==
The Act included a now-obsolete definition of the metric system and tables of units. (The notes at the end of some tables are not from the original document itself but are included for clarity.)

Measures of Length
Metric Denominations and Value		Equivalents in Denominations in Use
Myriameter	10,000 meters	6.2137 Miles
Kilometer	1,000 meters	0.62137 Miles or 3,280 Feet & 10 Inches
Hectometer	100 meters	328 Feet & 1 Inch
Dekameter	10 meters	393.7 Inches
Meter	1 meter	39.37 Inches
Decimeter	1/10 meter	3.937 Inches
Centimeter	1/100 meter	0.3937 Inches
Millimeter	1/1000 meter	0.0394 Inches

Measures of Surface
Metric Denominations and Value		Equivalents in Denominations in Use
Hectare	10,000 square meters	2.471 acres
Are	100 square meters	119.6 square yards
Centare	1 square meter	1550 square inches

Measures of Capacity
Metric Denominations and Value			Equivalents in Denominations in Use	
Name	Number of Liters	Cubic Measures	Dry Measures	Liquid Measures
Kiloliter	1,000 liters	1 cubic meter	1.308 cubic yards	264.17 gallons
Stère	-	1 cubic meter	-	-
Hectoliter	100 liters	1/10 cubic meter	2 bushels & 3.35 pecks	26.417 gallons
Dekaliter	10 liters	10 cubic decimeters	9.08 dry quarts	2.6417 gallons
Liter	1 liter	1 cubic decimeter	0.908 dry quarts	1.0567 quarts
Deciliter	1/10 liter	1/10 cubic decimeter	6.1022 cubic inches	0.843 gills
Centiliter	1/100 liter	10 cubic centimeters	0.6102 cubic inches	0.338 fluid ounces
Milliliter	1/1000 liter	1 cubic centimeter	0.061 cubic inches	0.27 fluid drams

Notes,

Stère: [Greek > Stereo = "Solid"] A metric measurement of firewood or lumber equivalent to the cord.

Weights
Metric Denominations and Value			Equivalents in Denominations in Use
Name	Number of grams	Weight of what quantity of water at maximum density	Avoirdupois Weight
Millier or Tonneau	1,000,000 grams; [1,000 kilograms]	1 cubic meter	2204.6 pounds
Quintal	100,000 grams; [100 kilograms]	1 hectoliter	220.46 pounds
Myriagram	10,000 grams; [10 kilograms]	10 liters	22.046 pounds
Kilogram	1,000 grams	1 liter	2.2046 pounds
Hectogram	100 grams	1 deciliter	3.5274 ounces
Dekagram	10 grams	10 cubic centiliters	0.3527 ounces
Gram	1 gram	1 cubic centiliter	15.432 grains
Decigram	1/10 gram	1/10 cubic centiliter	1.5432 grains
Centigram	1/100 gram	10 cubic milliliters	0.1543 grains
Milligram	1/1000 gram	1 cubic milliliter	0.0154 grains

Notes,
The metric measures in brackets in the above table are not from the original document but are conversions into kilograms for clarity.
Millier: [ French > mille = “a thousand”] 1) A unit of a thousand. 2a) A metric ton. 2b) A thousand kilos. 2c) A million grams.
Quintal: [ medieval Latin > quintale; Arabic > qinṭār; classical Latin > centenarius = ‘containing a hundred units’] 1) A customary unit of weight equal to 100 pounds. 2) British: A unit of weight equal to a hundredweight (112 lb). 3) A metric unit of weight equal to 100 kilograms.
Tonneau: [ French > "barrel"] A weight equal to 1 million grams (or 1 millier), 10 quintals, 100 Myriagrams, or 1,000 Kilograms.

== Amendments ==
On August 9, 2007, the 1866 Act was amended by Pub. L. 110–69 (text) (PDF), the America COMPETES Act. It replaced the old definition of the metric system with the modern-day definition of SI.

- The Millier and Tonneau (1,000,000 grams) were replaced by the Megagram.
- The Stère (1 cubic meter) and Quintal (100,000 grams) are no longer officially part of the metric system.
- The Myriameter (10,000 meters) and Myriagram (10,000 grams) were dropped as unnecessary units. They are now expressed in kilometers and kilograms (units of 1,000).

== See also ==
- Seconds pendulum
