= Yard =

Unit of length

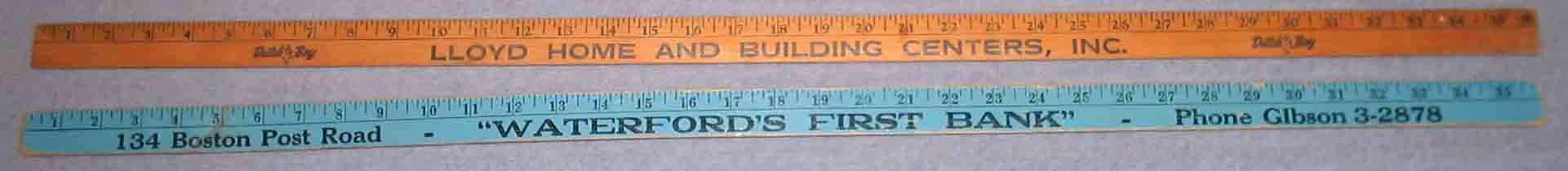
- Two yardsticks, used for measuring "yard goods"

General information
- Unit system: imperial/US units
- Unit of: Length
- Symbol: yd

Conversions
| 1 yd in ... | ... is equal to ... |
- Imperial/US units: 3 ft 36 in
- Metric (SI) units: 0.9144 m

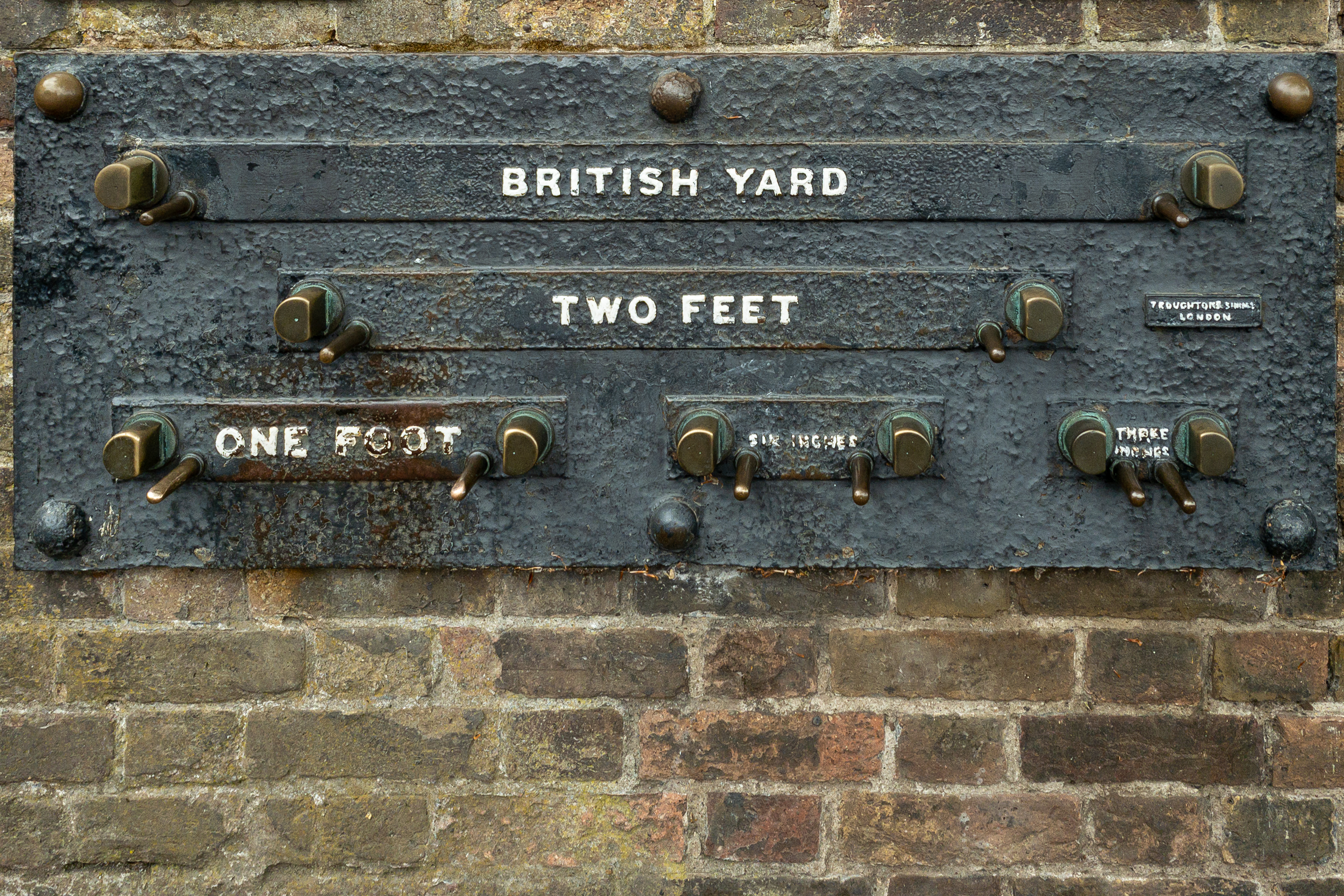
The informal public imperial measurement standards erected at the Royal Observatory, Greenwich, in the 19th century: 1 British yard, 2 feet, 1 foot, 6 inches, and 3 inches. The inexact monument was designed to permit rods of the correct measure to fit snugly into its pins at an ambient temperature of 62 °F (16.66 °C).

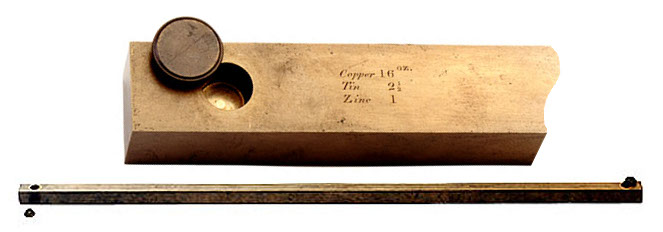
Bronze Yard No.11, the official standard of length for the United States between 1855 and 1892, when the Treasury Department formally adopted a metric standard. Bronze Yard No.11 was forged to be an exact copy of the British Imperial Standard Yard held by Parliament. Both are line standards: the yard was defined by the distance at 62°F between two fine lines drawn on gold plugs (closeup, top) installed in recesses near each end of the bar.

The yard (symbol: yd) is an English unit of length in both the British imperial and US customary systems of measurement equalling 3 feet or 36 inches. Since 1959 it has been by international agreement standardized as exactly 0.9144 meter. A distance of 1,760 yards is equal to 1 mile.

The theoretical US survey yard is very slightly longer.

== Name ==
The term, yard derives from the Old English gerd, gyrd etc., which was used for branches, staves and measuring rods. It is first attested in the late 7th century laws of Ine of Wessex, wherein the "yard of land" mentioned is the yardland, an old English unit of tax assessment equal to 1/4 hide. (Note: The later Latin gloss virgata terre describes it as "branched".) Old and Middle English both used their forms of "yard" to denote the surveying lengths of 15 feet (4.6 m) or 16.5 feet (5.0 m), used in computing acres, a distance now usually known as the "rod".

A unit of three English feet is attested in a statute of c. 1300 (see below), but there it is called an ell (ulna, lit. "arm"), a separate and usually longer unit of around 45 inches (1,100 mm). The use of the word ‘yard’ (Middle English: ȝerd or ȝerde) to describe this length is first attested in William Langland's poem on Piers Plowman. (Note: Middle English: Thanne drowe I me amonges draperes · my donet to lerne / To drawe þe lyser alonge [·] þe lenger it semed / Amonge þe riche rayes · I rendred a lessoun / To broche hem with a bat-nedle · and plaited hem togyderes / And put hem in a presse · and pyned hem þerinne / Tyl ten ȝerdes or twelue · tolled out threttene Translation: "Then tarried I amongst drapers · my grammar to learn; /To draw the selvedge along · the longer it seemed; /Among the rich ranged cloths · rendered a lesson, / To pierce them with a pack-needle · and plait them together, / Put them in a press · and pin them therein / Till ten yards or twelve · had tolled out to thirteen.) The usage seems to derive from the prototype standard rods held by the king and his magistrates (see below).

The word 'yard' is a homonym of 'yard' in the sense of an enclosed area of land. This second meaning of 'yard' has an etymology related to the word 'garden' and is not related to the unit of measurement.

In India the yard is colloquially known as a guz, which equals 3 feet.

== History ==
=== Origin ===
The origin of the yard measure is uncertain. Both the Romans and the Welsh used multiples of a shorter foot, but 2 1/2 Roman feet was a "step" (Latin: gradus) and 3 Welsh feet was a "pace" (Welsh: cam). The Proto-Germanic "cubit" or arm's-length has been reconstructed as *alinô, which developed into the Old English eln, Middle English elne, and modern ell of 1.25 yd (1.14 m). This has led some to derive the yard of three English feet from pacing; others from the ell or cubit; and still others from Henry I's arm standard. Based on the etymology of the other "yard", some suggest it originally derived from the girth of a person's waist, while others believe it originated as a cubic measure. One official British report writes:

The standard of measure has always been taken either from some part of the human body, such as a foot, the length of the arm, the span of the hand, or from other natural objects, such as a barleycorn, or other kind of grain. But the yard was the original standard adopted by the early English sovereigns, and has been supposed to be founded upon the breadth of the chest of the Saxon race. The yard continued till the reign of Henry VII., when the ell was introduced, that being a yard and a quarter, or 45 inches. The ell was borrowed from the Paris drapers. Subsequently, however, Queen Elizabeth re-introduced the yard as the English standard of measure.

=== From ell to yard ===
The earliest record of a prototype measure is the statute II Edgar Cap. 8 (AD 959 x 963), which survives in several variant manuscripts. In it, Edgar the Peaceful directed the Witenagemot at Andover that "the measure held at Winchester" should be observed throughout his realm. (Some manuscripts read "at London and at Winchester".) The statutes of William I similarly refer to and uphold the standard measures of his predecessors without naming them.

William of Malmesbury's Deeds of the Kings of England records that during the reign of Henry I (1100–1135), "the measure of his arm was applied to correct the false ell of the traders and enjoined on all throughout England." The folktale that the length was bounded by the king's nose was added some centuries later. Charles Moore Watson dismisses William's account as "childish", but William was among the most conscientious and trustworthy medieval historians. The French "king's foot" was supposed to have derived from Charlemagne, and the English kings subsequently repeatedly intervened to impose shorter units with the aim of increasing tax revenue.

The earliest surviving definition of this shorter unit appears in the Act on the Composition of Yards and Perches, one of the statutes of uncertain date (Note: Although not originally statutes, the statutes of an uncertain date were eventually accepted as such with the passage of time.) tentatively dated to the reign of Edward I or II c. 1300. Its wording varies in surviving accounts. One reads: (Note: BL Cotton MS Claudius D2, cited and translated in Ruffhead.)

It is ordained that 3 grains of barley dry and round do make an inch, 12 inches make 1 foot, 3 feet make 1 yard, 5 yards and a half make a perch, and 40 perches in length and 4 in breadth make an acre.

The Liber Horn compilation (1311) includes that statute with slightly different wording and adds:

And be it remembered that the iron yard of our Lord the King containeth 3 feet and no more, and a foot ought to contain 12 inches by the right measure of this yard measured, to wit, the 36th part of this yard rightly measured maketh 1 inch neither more nor less and 5 yards and a half make a perch that is 16 feet and a half measured by the aforesaid yard of our Lord the King.

In some early books, this act was appended to another statute of uncertain date titled the Statute for the Measuring of Land. The act was not repealed until the Weights and Measures Act 1824. (Note: 5 Geo. 4. c. 74, §24.)

=== Yard and inch ===
In a law of 1439 (18 Hen. 6. c. 16) the sale of cloth by the "yard and handful" was abolished, and the "yard and inch" instituted (see ell).

There shall be but one Measure of Cloth through the Realm by the Yard and the Inch, and not by the Yard and Handful, according to the London Measure.

According to Connor, cloth merchants had previously sold cloth by the yard and handful to evade high taxes on cloth (the extra handful being essentially a black-market transaction). Enforcement efforts resulted in cloth merchants switching over to the yard and inch, at which point the government gave up and made the yard and inch official. In 1552, the yard and inch for cloth measurement was again sanctioned in law (5 & 6 Edw. 6. c. 6. An Act for the true making of Woolen Cloth.)

XIV. And that all and every Broad Cloth and Clothes called Taunton Clothes, Bridgwaters, and other Clothes which shall be made after the said Feast in Taunton, Bridgwater or in other Places of like Sort, shall contain at the Water in Length betwixt twelve and thirteen Yards, Yard and Inch of the Rule, and in Breadth seven Quarters of a Yard: (2) And every narrow Cloth made after the said Feast in the said Towns or elsewhere of like Sorts, shall contain in the Water in Length betwixt three and twenty and five and twenty Yards, Yard and Inch as is aforesaid, and in Breadth one Yard of like Measure; (3) and every such Cloth, both Broad and Narrow being well scowred, thicked, milled and fully dried, shall weigh xxxiv. li. the Piece at the least.

XV. And that all Clothes named Check-Kersie and Straits, which shall be made after the said Feast shall contain being wet between seventeen and eighteen Yards, with the Inches as is aforesaid, and in Breadth one Yard at the least at the Water; and being well scowred, thicked, milled and fully dried, shall weigh xxiv. li. the Piece at the least.

The yard and inch for cloth measurement was also sanctioned again in legislation of 1557–1558 (4 & 5 Ph. & M. c. 5. An act touching the making of woolen clothes. par. IX.)

IX. Item, That every ordinary kersie mentioned in the said act shall contain in length in the water betwixt xvi. and xvii. yards, yard and inch; and being well scoured thicked, milled, dressed and fully dried, shall weigh nineteen pounds the piece at the least:...

As recently as 1593, the same principle is found mentioned once again (35 Eliz. 1. c. 10 An act for the reformation of sundry abuses in clothes, called Devonshire kerjies [sic] or dozens, according to a proclamation of the thirty-fourth year of the reign of our sovereign lady the Queen that now is. par. III.)

(2) and each and every of the same Devonshire kersies or dozens, so being raw, and as it cometh forth off the weaver's loom (without racking, stretching, straining or other device to encrease the length thereof) shall contain in length between fifteen and sixteen yards by the measure of yard and inch by the rule,...

=== Physical standards ===
One of the oldest yard-rods in existence is the clothyard of the Worshipful Company of Merchant Taylors. It consists of a hexagonal iron rod 5/8 in (16 mm) in diameter and 1/100 in (0.25 mm) short of a yard, encased within a silver rod bearing the hallmark 1445. In the early 15th century, the Merchant Taylors Company was authorized to "make search" at the opening of the annual St. Bartholomew's Day Cloth Fair. In the mid-18th century, Graham compared the standard yard of the Royal Society to other existing standards. These were a "long-disused" standard made in 1490 during the reign of Henry VII, and a brass yard and a brass ell from 1588 in the time of Queen Elizabeth and still in use at the time, held at the Exchequer; a brass yard and a brass ell at the Guildhall; and a brass yard presented to the Clock-Makers' Company by the Exchequer in 1671. The Exchequer yard was taken as "true"; the variation was found to be +1/20 to −1/15 of an inch, and an additional graduation for the Exchequer yard was made on the Royal Society's standard. In 1758 the legislature required the construction of a standard yard, which was made from the Royal Society's standard and was deposited with the clerk of the House of Commons; it was divided into feet, one of the feet into inches, and one of the inches into tenths. A copy of it, but with upright cheeks between which other measuring rods could be placed, was made for the Exchequer for commercial use.

=== 19th-century Britain ===
Following Royal Society investigations by John Playfair, William Hyde Wollaston and John Warner in 1814 a committee of parliament proposed defining the standard yard based upon the length of a seconds pendulum. This idea was examined but not approved. The Weights and Measures Act 1824 (5 Geo. 4. c. 74) An Act for ascertaining and establishing Uniformity of Weights and Measures stipulates that:

From and after the First Day of May One thousand eight hundred and twenty five the Straight Line or Distance between the Centres of the Two Points in the Gold Studs of the Straight Brass Rod now in the Custody of the Clerk of the House of Commons whereon the Words and Figures "Standard Yard 1760" are engraved shall be and the same is hereby declared to be the original and genuine Standard of that Measure of Length or lineal Extension called a Yard; and that the same Straight Line or Distance between the Centres of the said Two Points in the said Gold Studs in the said Brass Rod the Brass being at the Temperature of Sixty two Degrees by Fahrenheit's Thermometer shall be and is hereby denominated the Imperial Standard Yard and shall be and is hereby declared to be the Unit or only Standard Measure of Extension, wherefrom or whereby all other Measures of Extension whatsoever, whether the same be lineal, superficial or solid, shall be derived, computed and ascertained; and that all Measures of Length shall be taken in Parts or Multiples, or certain Proportions of the said Standard Yard; and that One third Part of the said Standard Yard shall be a Foot, and the Twelfth Part of such Foot shall be an Inch; and that the Pole or Perch in Length shall contain Five such Yards and a Half, the Furlong Two hundred and twenty such Yards, and the Mile One thousand seven hundred and sixty such Yards.

In 1834, the primary Imperial yard standard was partially destroyed in a fire known as the Burning of Parliament. (Note: The following references are useful for identifying the authors of the preceding reference: Ref., Ref., and Ref.). In 1838, a commission (Note: Whose report was referenced in Ref.) was formed to reconstruct the lost standards, including the troy pound, which had also been destroyed. In 1845, a new yard standard was constructed based on two previously existing standards known as A1 and A2, both of which had been made for the Ordnance Survey, and R.S. 46, the yard of the Royal Astronomical Society. All three had been compared to the Imperial standard before the fire.

The new standard was made of Baily's metal No. 4 consisting of 16 parts copper, 2 1/2 parts tin, and 1 part zinc. It was 38 inches long and 1 inch square. The Weights and Measures Act 1855 granted official recognition to the new standards. Between 1845 and 1855 forty yard standards were constructed, one of which was selected as the new Imperial standard. Four others, known as 'parliamentary copies', were distributed to the Royal Mint, the Royal Society of London, the Royal Observatory at Greenwich, and the New Palace at Westminster, commonly called the Houses of Parliament. The other 35 yard standards were distributed to the cities of London, Edinburgh, and Dublin, as well as the United States and other countries (although only the first five had official status). The imperial standard received by the United States is known as "Bronze Yard No. 11"

The Weights and Measures Act 1878 (41 & 42 Vict. c. 49) confirmed the status of the existing yard standard, mandated regular intercomparisons between the several yard standards, and authorized the construction of one additional Parliamentary Copy (made in 1879 and known as Parliamentary Copy VI).

=== Definition of the yard in terms of the meter ===
Subsequent measurements revealed that the yard standard and its copies were shrinking at the rate of one part per million every twenty years due to the gradual release of strain incurred during the fabrication process. The international prototype meter, on the other hand, was comparatively stable. A measurement made in 1895 determined the length of the meter at 39.370113 inches relative to the imperial standard yard. The Weights and Measures (Metric System) Act 1897 (60 & 61 Vict. c. 46) in conjunction with Order in Council 411 (1898) made this relationship official. After 1898, the de facto legal definition of the yard came to be accepted as 36/39.370113 of a meter.

The yard (known as the "international yard" in the United States) was legally defined to be exactly 0.9144 meter in 1959 under an agreement in 1959 between Australia, Canada, New Zealand, South Africa, the United Kingdom and the United States. In the UK, the provisions of the treaty were ratified by the Weights and Measures Act 1963. The Imperial Standard Yard of 1855 was renamed the United Kingdom Primary Standard Yard and retained its official status as the national prototype yard.

== Current use ==
In UK road signs, shorter distances (such as picnic area 150 yards ahead) are given in yards, with longer distances given in miles

The yard is used to define the dimensions of the playing area in American football, Canadian football, association football, cricket, and in some countries golf.

There are corresponding units of area and volume, the square yard and cubic yard respectively. These are sometimes referred to simply as "yards" when no ambiguity is possible, for example an American or Canadian concrete mixer may be marked with a capacity of "9 yards" or "1.5 yards", where cubic yards are obviously referred to.

Yards are also used and are the legal requirement on road signs for shorter distances in the United Kingdom, and are also frequently found in conversation between Britons much like in the United States for distance.

=== Textiles and fat quarters ===
The yard, subdivided into eighths, is used for the purchase of fabrics in the United States and United Kingdom (Note: In the United Kingdom fabric may be sold by the yard if the equivalent metric measure is also given. Major shops sell by the meter.) and was previously used elsewhere. In the United States the term "fat quarter" is used for a piece of fabric which is half a yard in length cut from a roll and then cut again along the width so that it is only half the width of the roll, thus the same area as a piece of one quarter yard cut from the full width of the roll; these pieces are popular for patchwork and quilting. The term "fat eighth" is also used, for a piece of one quarter yard from half the roll width, the same area as one eighth cut from the roll.

== Equivalences ==
For purposes of measuring cloth, the early yard was divided by the binary method into two, four, eight and sixteen parts. The two most common divisions were the fourth and sixteenth parts. The quarter of a yard (9 inches) was known as the "quarter" without further qualification, while the sixteenth of a yard (2.25 inches) was called a nail. The eighth of a yard (4.5 inches) was sometimes called a finger, but was more commonly referred to simply as an eighth of a yard, while the half-yard (18 inches) was called "half a yard".

Other units related to the yard, but not specific to cloth measurement: two yards are a fathom and a quarter of a yard (when not referring to cloth) is a span.

== Conversions ==
500000 (international) yards = 499999 survey yards = 457200 meters.
1250 (international) yards = 1143 meters.
3937 survey yards = 3600 meters.
1 (international) yard = 0.999998 survey yards = 0.9144 meters.
1 survey yard ≈ 0.914401828803... meters.
1 (international) statute mile = 8 international furlongs = 80 international chains = 1760 (international) yards.
1 survey mile = 8 furlongs = 80 chains = 1760 survey yards.

Where

- pre-1959 US yard – defined 1869, implemented 1893, deprecated 2023 For survey purposes, certain pre-1959 units were retained, usually prefaced by the word "survey," among them the survey inch, survey foot, and survey mile, also known as the statute mile. The rod and furlong existed only in their pre-1959 form and are thus not prefaced by the word "survey", and were deprecated at the same time as the survey foot. New conversion factors for the rod and furlong as 16.5 international feet and 660 international feet respectively have been published by NIST. However, it is not clear if a "survey yard" actually existed.
- international yard (defined 1959):

== See also ==
- Guz, a similar unit used in Asia
- 3 ft gauge railways
- Vara
- Yardstick
