= Alnage =

Supervision of the shape and quality of manufactured woollen cloth

Alnage, or aulnage (from Old French aune, ell; parallel to "yardage") was the official supervision of the shape and quality of manufactured woolen cloth.

== Origins ==
The alnage was first ordered in 1196, during the reign of Richard I, that "woollen cloths, wherever they are made, shall be of the same width, to wit, of two ells within the lists, and of the same goodness in the middle and sides." This ordinance is usually known as the Assize of Measures or the Assize of Cloth. Article 35 of Magna Carta re-enacted the Assize of Cloth, and in the reign of Edward I an official called an "alnager" or "aulnager" was appointed to enforce it. His duty was to measure each piece of cloth, and to affix a stamp to show that it was of the necessary size and quality. If faulty, the cloth was forfeit to the crown.

== Later developments ==
As, however, the diversity of the wool and the importation of cloths of various sizes from abroad made it impossible to maintain any specific standard of width, the rules as to size were repealed in 1353. The increased growth of the woolen trade, and the introduction of new and lighter drapery in the reign of Elizabeth I, compelled a revision of the old standards. A statute was passed in 1665 creating the office of alnager of the new drapery, and defining the sizes to which cloth should be woven. The object of the statute was to prevent people being deceived by buying spurious woolen cloth, and to provide against fraud and imposition. Owing to the introduction of the alternative standard, a distinction arose between "broadcloth" (broadwoven cloth of two yards) and "streit" or "strait" (narrow cloth of one yard). The meaning now attached to broadcloth, however, is often merely that of material of specific type.

In Norwich, the alnagers gave up responsibility for cloth standards in 1699. Cloth sealing there ended in 1705. The national alnage system ended in 1724 when the patent expired.

== Cloth seals ==
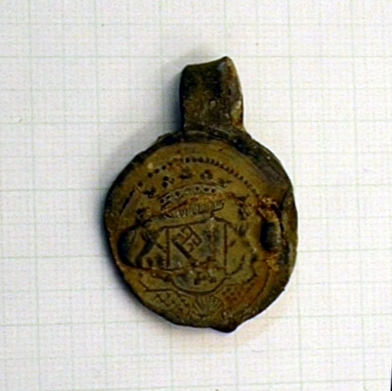
Cloth seal of a Bremen dyer, after 1793. Focke Museum, Bremen.

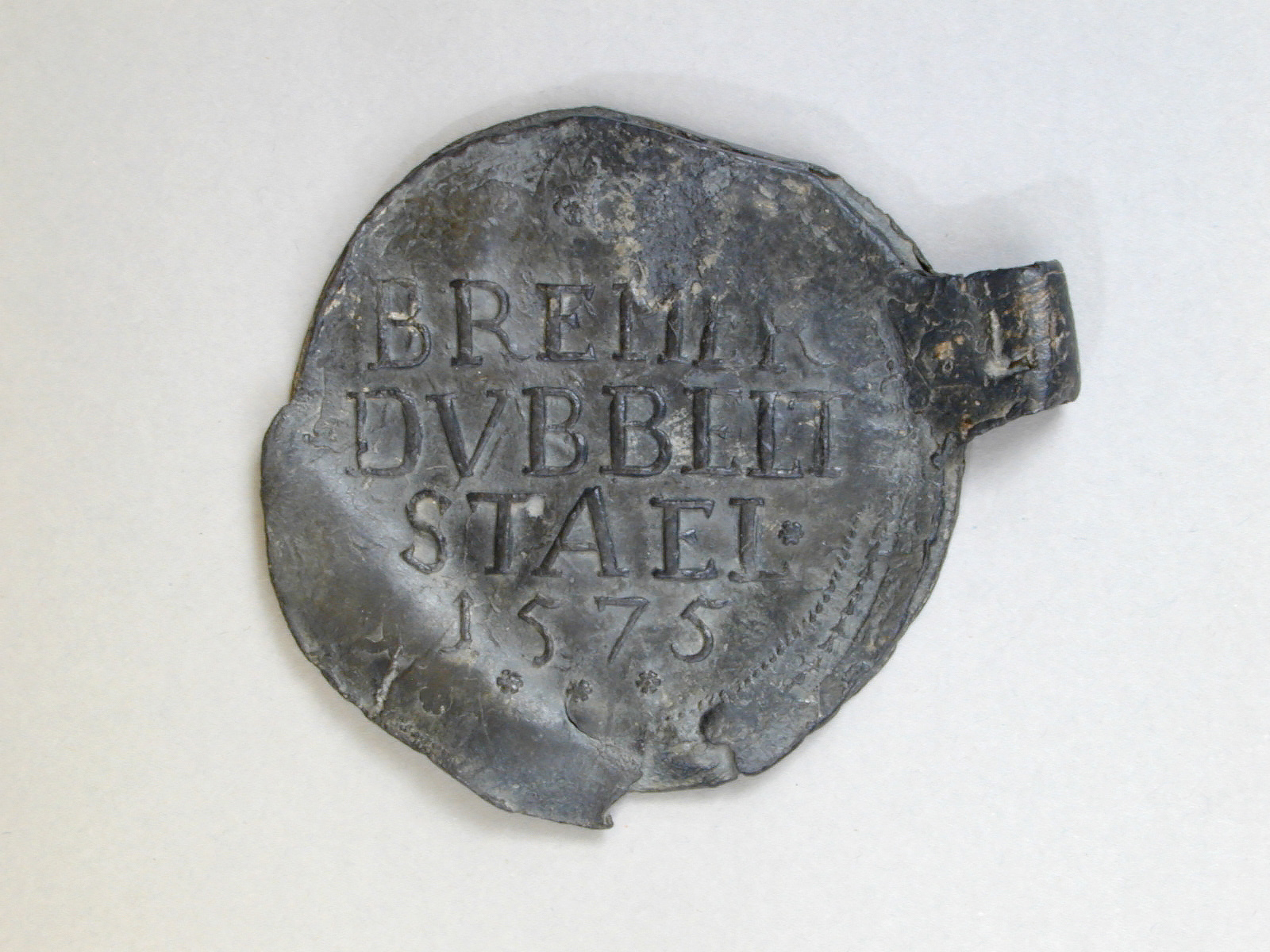
An unusually large cloth seal, 73 mm in diameter, from Bremen, 1575 or later. Focke Museum, Bremen.

Cloth seals were lead seals attached to cloth and other textiles, often to show that they had passed a quality inspection. They were used from the Middle Ages into the eighteenth century. Archaeologists use finds of cloth seals to identify where cloth was made and sold and how it travelled.

=== History ===
From the thirteenth century, municipal and guild regulations set standards for cloth and laid down rules for marking it. Inspection and marking helped to assure buyers of the quality of cloth sold through merchants. Some of the earliest surviving lead cloth seals date from the thirteenth and fourteenth centuries and came from textile centres in the Low Countries. Later medieval finds also point to textile centres in the region. The cloth industry in Holland gained ground as the Flemish industry declined.

Misuse and counterfeiting of cloth stamps could incur heavy penalties, including death. Municipal accounts from the cloth-trading town of Ypres in Flanders record tens of thousands of seals in individual years in the fourteenth century.

In northern Germany, cloth seals are more common in finds from the sixteenth and seventeenth centuries than in finds from the late Middle Ages. A year stamped on a seal could refer to the regulation under which the seal was issued.

=== Form and attachment ===
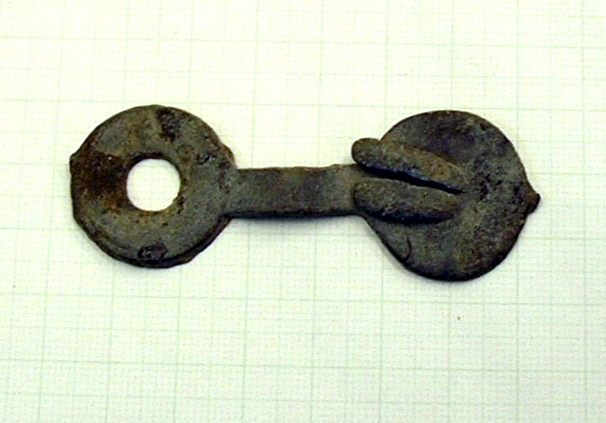
Cloth-seal blank found in Bremen, possibly from the nineteenth century. Focke Museum, Bremen.

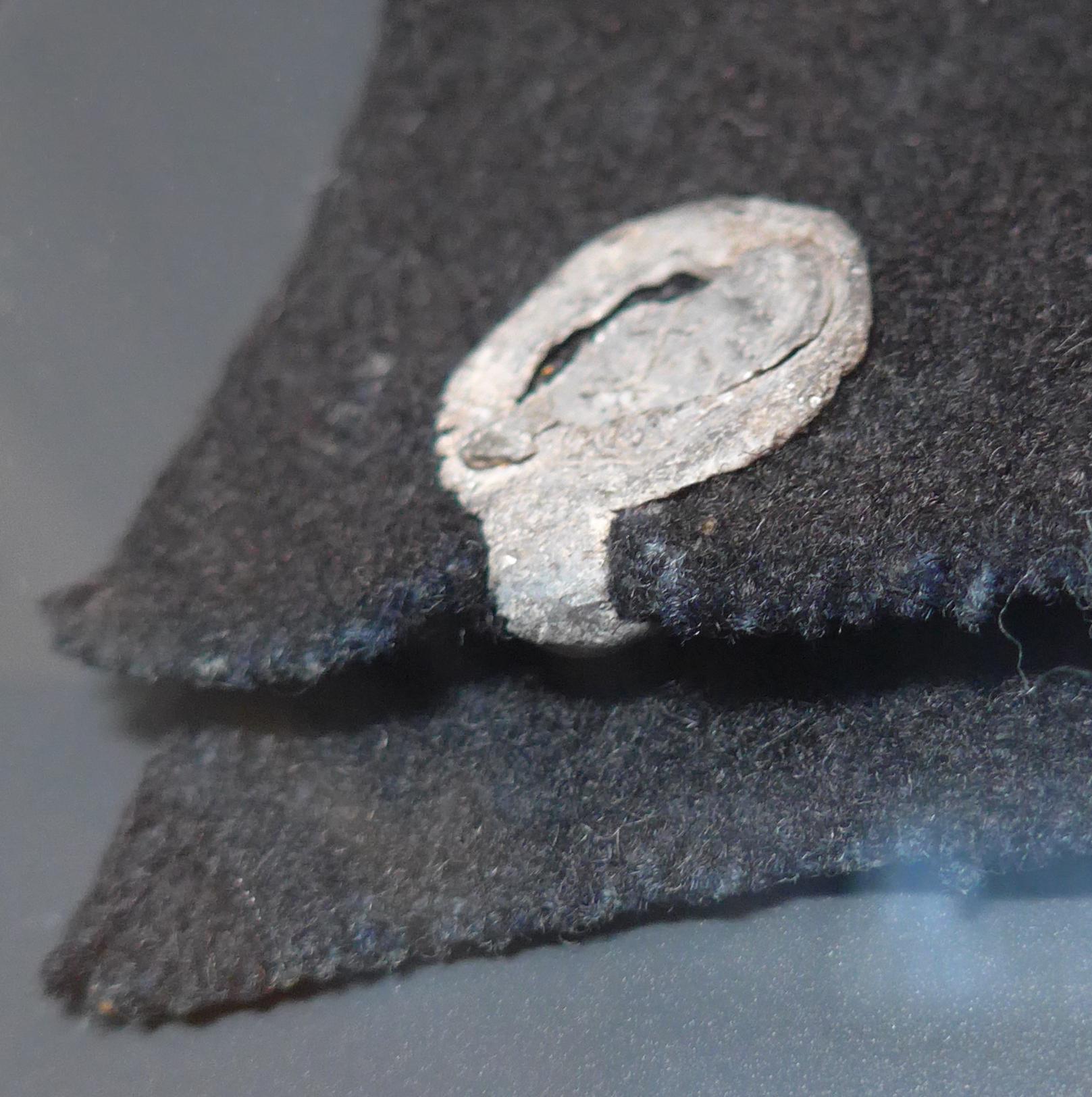
Cloth seal attached to the woollen funeral pall of the Bremen fishermen's guild, dated 1666. Focke Museum, Bremen.

The riveted cloth seal dates from the Middle Ages. Its blank consisted of two discs joined by a strip. A rivet, or sometimes two, projected from one disc. The rivet passed through the edge of the cloth and fitted into a hole in the other disc when the seal was folded. The discs were pressed together and stamped with tongs or a hammer and die. Opening the seal damaged it. Lead was soft enough to take the impression and durable enough to keep it.

A piece of cloth could carry several seals from merchants' inspections and checks after shearing or dyeing. Cloth shearers trimmed the surface of the woven cloth. Many late medieval English seals were about 20 to 25 mm across. Some cloth seals exceeded 60 mm. The Middle Low German verb stalen (to seal cloth) may be the source of the name of London's Steelyard.

=== Types ===
The stamped designs give clues to the purpose of a seal.

- A town's coat of arms or a word such as stael (sample) could indicate that the cloth had passed an inspection. Clothmakers, dyers and cloth merchants took part in inspections. They could check the dimensions, the thread density and the quality and depth of the dyeing.
- House marks and initials could identify the maker or show that a merchant owned the cloth. The maker's mark allowed the person responsible for the work to be traced.
- The coat of arms of England and profile portraits of English monarchs appear on alnage seals that recorded payment of the cloth tax. English cloth also reached Bremen.
- In the eighteenth century, lettering became the main design on most English cloth seals.
- Numbers stamped into the seal and lines scratched on the back could record measurements, such as the length of the cloth.
- Linen was also inspected. In the linen inspection houses of northwestern Germany, inspectors could stamp a mark directly on the fabric.

=== Distribution ===
Lead cloth seals were used across Europe. Finds from around the North Sea are particularly well documented. Many finds come from trading towns, and seals have also been found at rural sites. Tailors could remove a seal when they cut the cloth. In towns with strong guild controls, cloth often had to bear a seal before it could be sold.

== See also ==
- Maltolt
- Statute of the Staple
- Weights and Measures Acts (UK) for quotes of relevant legislation

== Sources ==
- Cherry, John (2019). "The Cloth Seal: A Mark of Quality, Identification, or Taxation?". In Bedos-Rezak, Brigitte Miriam; Symes, Carol (eds.). Seals: Making and Marking Connections across the Medieval World. Leeds: Arc Humanities Press. pp. 167–192. doi:10.1017/9781641892575.007.
- Egan, Geoffrey (1987). Provenanced Leaden Cloth Seals (PhD thesis). University of London.
- Egan, Geoff (1991). "Alnage Seals and the National Coinage: Some Parallels in Design" (PDF). British Numismatic Journal. 61: 31–36.
- Endrei, Walter; Egan, Geoff (1982). "The Sealing of Cloth in Europe, with Special Reference to the English Evidence". Textile History. 13 (1): 47–75. doi:10.1179/004049682793690913.
- Hayeur Smith, Michèle (2019). "Rumpelstiltsken's feat: cloth and German trade with Iceland". AmS-Skrifter. 27: 107–120.
- Hittinger, Dieter (2007a). "Tuchplomben der Neuzeit" [Cloth seals of the modern era]. Mitteilungen der Deutschen Gesellschaft für Archäologie des Mittelalters und der Neuzeit (in German). 18: 145–147.
- Hittinger, Dieter (2007b). "Die Bedeutung der Hausmarken für den Warentransport in der frühen Neuzeit" [The significance of house marks for the transport of goods in the early modern period]. Mitteilungen der Deutschen Gesellschaft für Archäologie des Mittelalters und der Neuzeit (in German). 18: 148–150.
- Ilisch, Peter (February 2011). Leggestempel der Grafschaft Tecklenburg [Linen inspection stamps of the County of Tecklenburg] (PDF) (Report). Das Kunstwerk des Monats (in German). Münster: LWL-Landesmuseum für Kunst und Kulturgeschichte.
- Keene, Derek (1989). "New Discoveries at the Hanseatic Steelyard in London" (PDF). Hansische Geschichtsblätter. 107: 15–26.
- Lambert, Bart; Sicking, Louis (2024). "Counts, cities and commerce: a comparative study of the institutional foundations of international trade in late medieval Flanders, Holland and Zeeland". Continuity and Change. 39 (3): 309–343. doi:10.1017/S0268416025000049.
- Mordovin, Maxim (2014). "Late Medieval and Early Modern Cloth Seals in the Collection of the Hungarian National Museum". Archaeologiai Értesítő. 139 (1): 193–237. doi:10.1556/ArchErt.139.2014.9.
- Mordovin, Maxim (2019). "Guide to the Identification of Archaeological Lead Cloth Seals" (PDF). Hungarian Archaeology. 8 (1): 20–27.
- Stabel, Peter (2022). The Fabric of the City: A Social History of Cloth Manufacture in Medieval Ypres. Studies in European Urban History (1100–1800). Vol. 59. Turnhout: Brepols. doi:10.1484/M.SEUH-EB.5.129628. ISBN 978-2-503-60051-2.
