= Kersey (cloth) =

Kind of coarse woollen cloth

- Type: Fabric
- Material: Wool
- Production method: Weaving
- Production process: Craft production
- Place of origin: Andover, England
- Introduced: 1262

Kersey is a kind of coarse woollen cloth that was a component of the textile trade in Medieval England.

== History ==
It derives its name from kersey yarn and ultimately from the village of Kersey, Suffolk, having presumably originated in that county. However the cloth was made in many places. It was being woven as early as 1262 in Andover, Hampshire, where regulations prohibited the inclusion of Spanish wool in kerseys. By 1475, the West Riding of Yorkshire including Calderdale was also a major producer, while Devon and Somerset were major producers and exporters until the manufacture later moved to serge making. Kersey was a lighter weight cloth than broadcloth. English kerseys were widely exported to central Europe and other places: a surviving business letter from the end of the 16th century recommends trading kerseys for good wine on the Canary Islands.

== Description ==
Kersey yarns were spun in large gauges (thicknesses) from inferior carded wool, and made thick and sturdy cloth. Kersey was a warp-backed, twill-weave cloth woven on a four-treadle loom.

As a rule, half the relatively small, numerous and closely set warp ends [threads] were struck with a big kersey weft in a two-and-two, unbalanced and highly prominent twill. The rest of the ends were simultaneously struck in a one-and-three twill, so they appeared mainly on the back of the cloth, while the back-warp stitches on the face of the cloth were concealed among the face-warp threads. One of the secrets of weaving a good kersey lay in combining the adequate stitching of the weft by the back warp with the concealment of the back-warp stitches.

The back of the cloth was napped and shorn after fulling, producing a dense, warm fabric with a smooth back.

== See also ==
- List of fabrics
