= Narrow cloth =

Fabric woven on a narrow loom

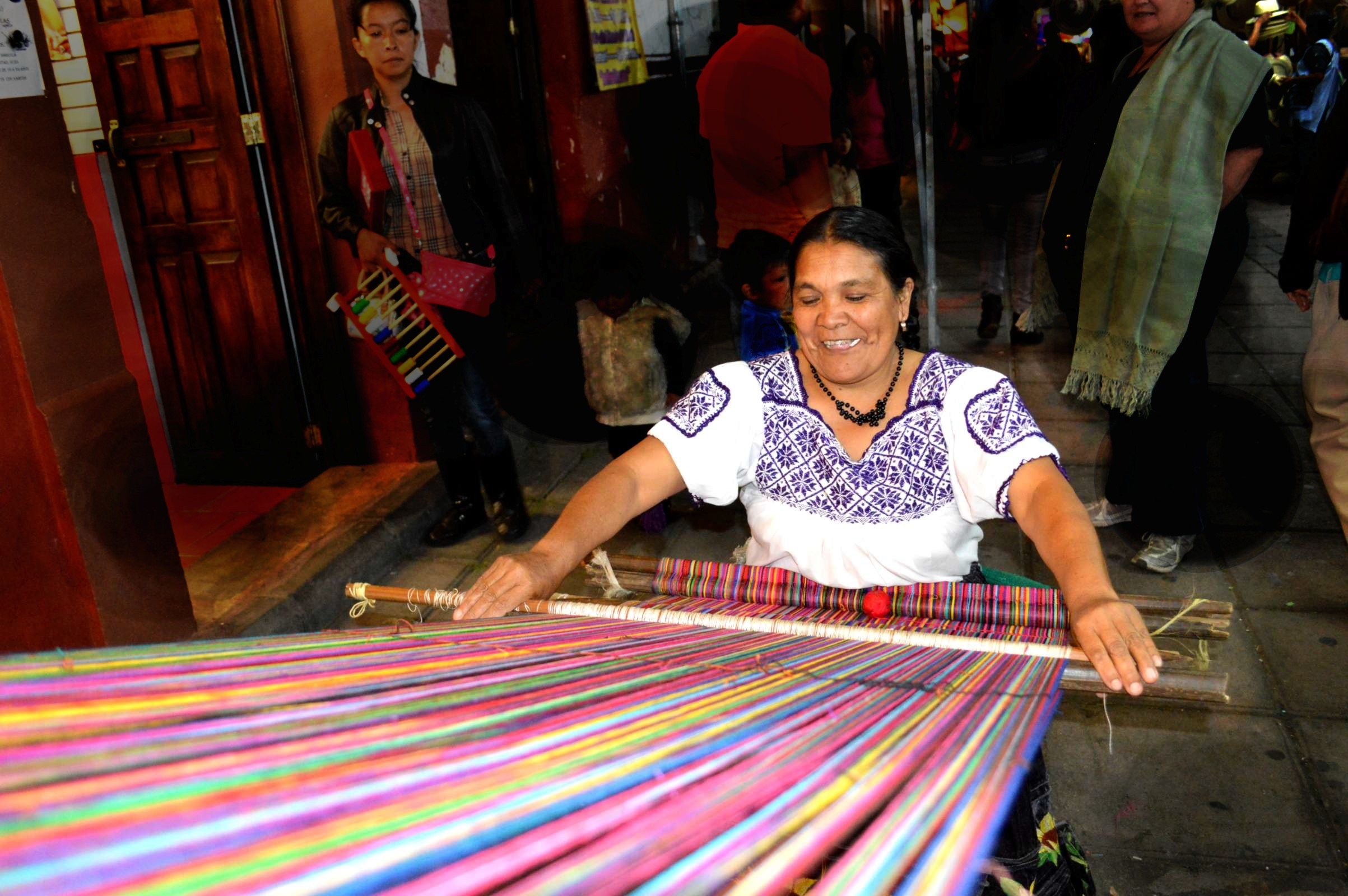
Weaving narrow cloth on a back-strap loom. A lone weaver without a flying shuttle must be able to span the cloth they are weaving with their arms.

"Narrow cloth" (streit, strait, narrow ware articles, narrow ware woven) is cloth of a comparatively narrow width, generally less than a human armspan; precise definitions vary.

Historically, human factors and ergonomics limited the width that could practically be woven by a single weaver on a handloom. The weaver had to be able to reach both edges of the cloth, so they could throw the shuttle through the shed. A weaver thus could not weave a bolt wider than their armspan. So cloth was typically made in narrow widths on narrow-width handlooms.

Wider widths once had to be woven with a person on each side of the loom, usually the master weaver and an apprentice, throwing the shuttle back and forth between them. In 1733, the flying shuttle was invented. Flying shuttles made it possible for a single hand weaver to weave widths greater than their armspan, halving the labour required to make broadcloth. Fabric widths became limited by the impracticality of transporting very wide bolts and looms.

Various maximum measures of breadth were used to legally define narrow cloth, and "broadcloth" was often regulated to be twice the width of narrow cloth. The word "broadcloth" was originally used just as an antonym to "narrow cloth", but later came to mean a particular type of cloth (see broadcloth). The 1909 Webster's dictionary (as reprinted in 1913) defines broadcloth as "A fine smooth-faced woolen cloth for men's garments, usually of double width". thus giving both the old breadth-based distinction and the newer definition based on the type of cloth. Broadwoven and narrow woven are unambiguous terms, used by the US government.

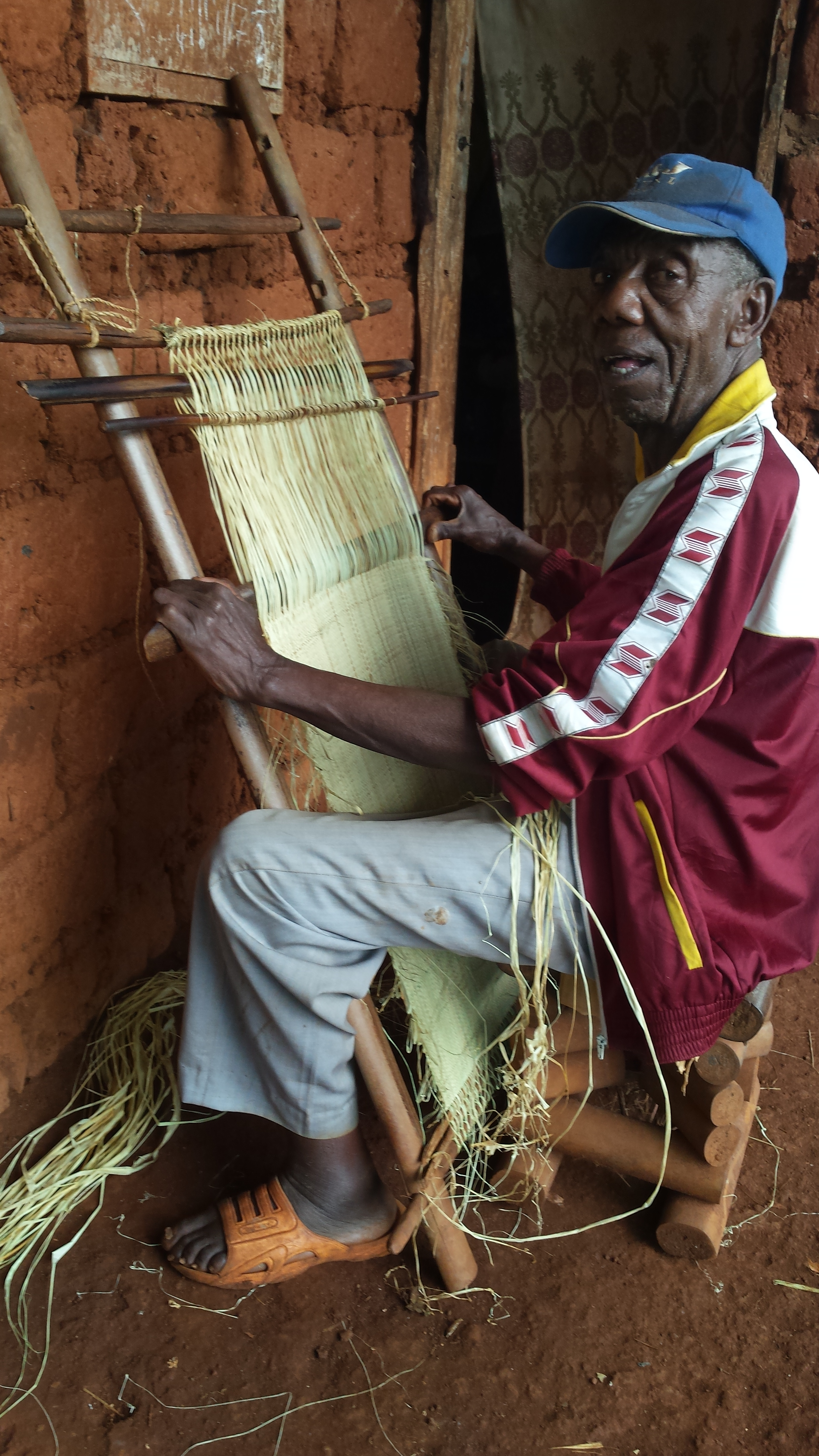
Weaving raffia on an upright loom in Babouantou, Cameroon.

Weaving a rebozo on a backstrap loom in Santa María del Río, San Luis Potosí, Mexico

A weaver passes the shuttle through the shed of her treadle loom.

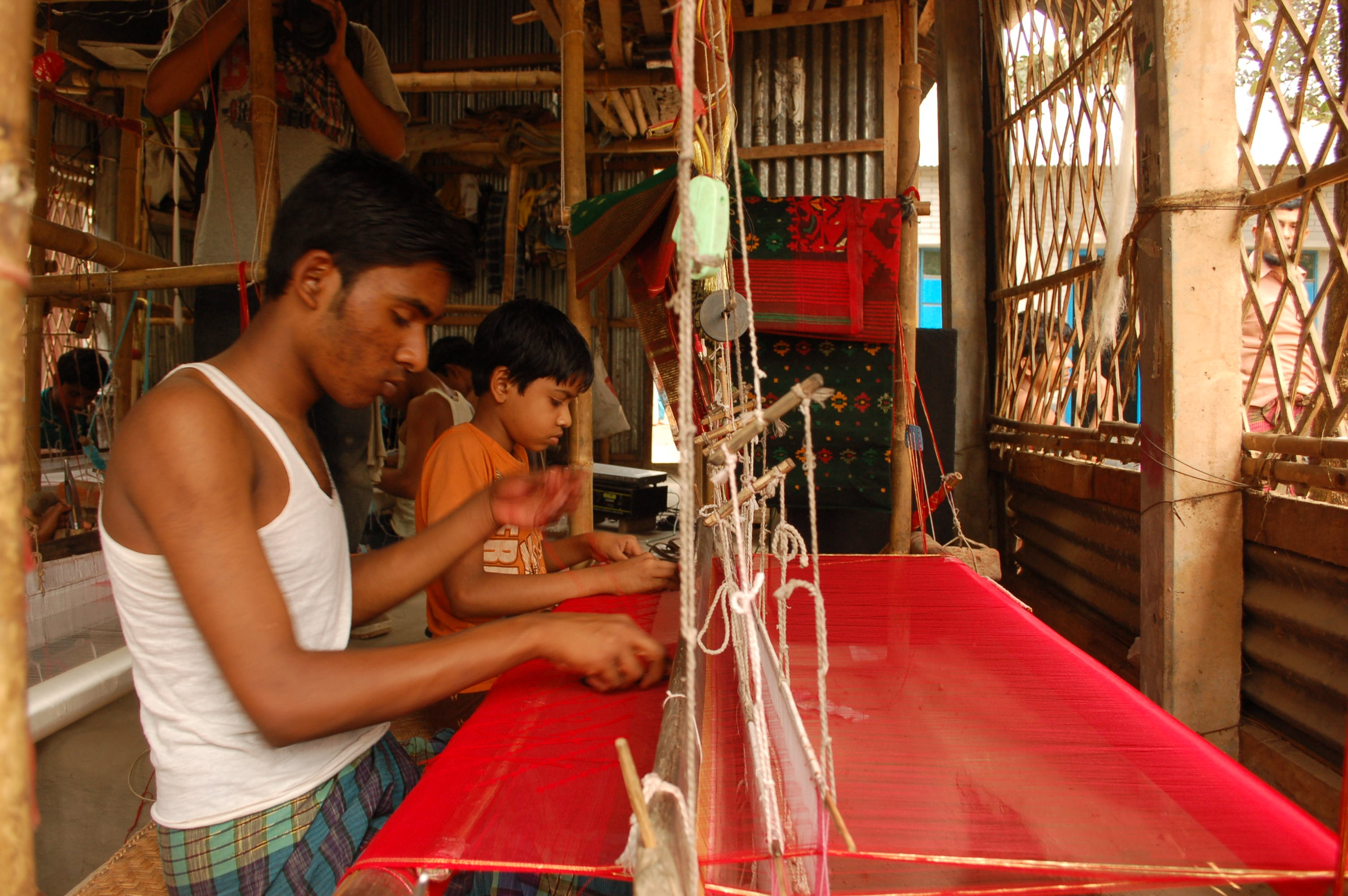
Weaving jamdani on a two-person loom.

An early fully-automated loom. The arms at the sides can be seen swinging to bash the flying shuttle back and forth.

== Significance ==
Due to the narrower width, they were less prone to shrinkage than broadcloths and thus required less milling.

== Historic trade definitions ==
In England, efforts were made to standardize the width of cloth, to promote mercery. The first on record is the Assize of Cloth (also called the Assize of Measures), which was first introduced in the reign of Richard I (1189–1199). It defined two English ells (then 74 inches, 190 cm) as the only legal breadth for woolen cloth. Article 35 of Magna Carta reaffirmed this standard; it said "There shall be standard measures of wine, ale, and corn (the London quarter), throughout the kingdom. There shall also be a standard width of dyed [generally wollen] cloth, russet, and haberject, namely two ells within the selvedges. Weights are to be standardised similarly." In the reign of Edward I (1272–1307), an official called the king's alnager was appointed to enforce the law, and all towns were required to have an accurate ellwand (measuring stick one ell in length). These rules were repealed in 1353, because imports and varying types of wool made them impractical. In 1665, in the reign of Charles II, the office of alnager was revived. Two standard widths were defined: widths of 2 yards (180 cm) were called broadcloth, and widths of 1 yard (91 cm), narrow cloth. The office of the alnager was abolished again in 1699. See Weights and Measures Acts (UK) § England for details.

In the late-sixteen- and seventeen-hundreds, English merchants exported broadcloth to both the Levant and the Indies. This cloth was defined as having a breadth greater than a 1.25 yards (114 cm). Anything narrower was narrow cloth.

James Bischoff noted in his 1842 publication, A Comprehensive History of the Woollen, and Worsted Manufactures, that British woolens were imported into Ireland with two different descriptions, broadcloth and narrow cloth. These were priced (per yard length) at six shillings fourpence and three shillings eightpence, respectively. He did not mention whether the two were distinguished by width, but the doubling of price suggests that broadcloth was similar to narrow cloth except for being twice the width.

In the United States in the early 19-hundreds, fabrics with a width of less than 29 inches (74 cm) were classed as narrow cloth; wider fabrics were classed as broadcloth. The American 1909 Webster's dictionary (as reprinted in 1913) defines broadcloth as 1.5 yards (140 cm), and narrow cloth as 0.75 yards (69 cm), but also gives the newer definition based on the type of cloth.

In the 1990s, the US government defined "broadwoven fabrics" and "narrow woven fabrics", with a breadth cutoff of 30 centimeters (about 12 inches) (per the Harmonized Tariff Schedule of the United States). By this definition, the US government estimates that 70-75% of all cloth production globally, by weight, is broadwoven.

== Types and uses ==
Narrow-loom cloth is still made by in artisanal weaving. Traditional-format textiles in narrow widths are also machine-made. These are used from making traditional garments and other traditional textile items.

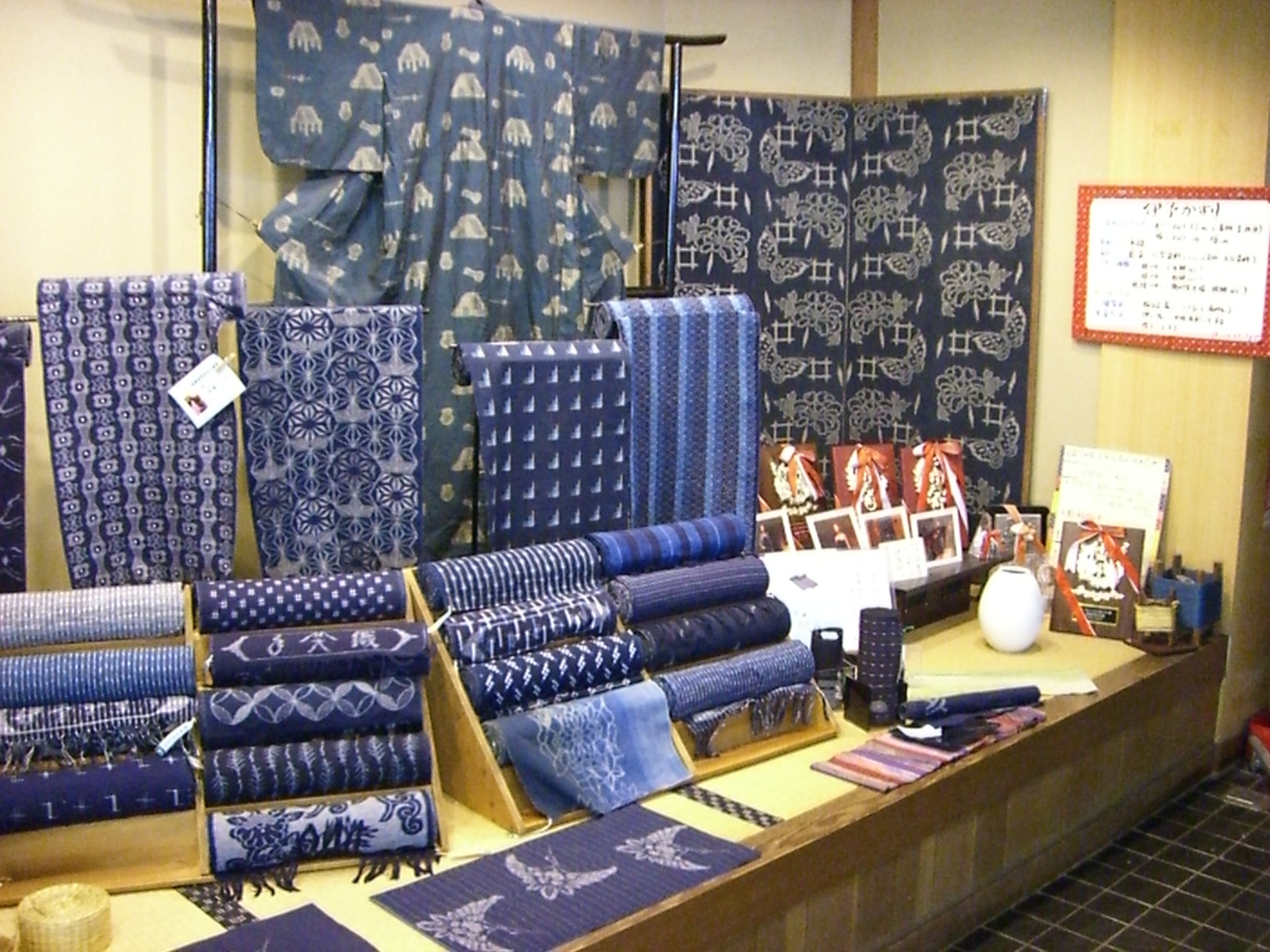
Tanmono, traditional narrow Japanese fabric bolts. This is cotton dyed with indigo before weaving (kasuri) Behind is a yukata (type of kimono) made from this cloth.

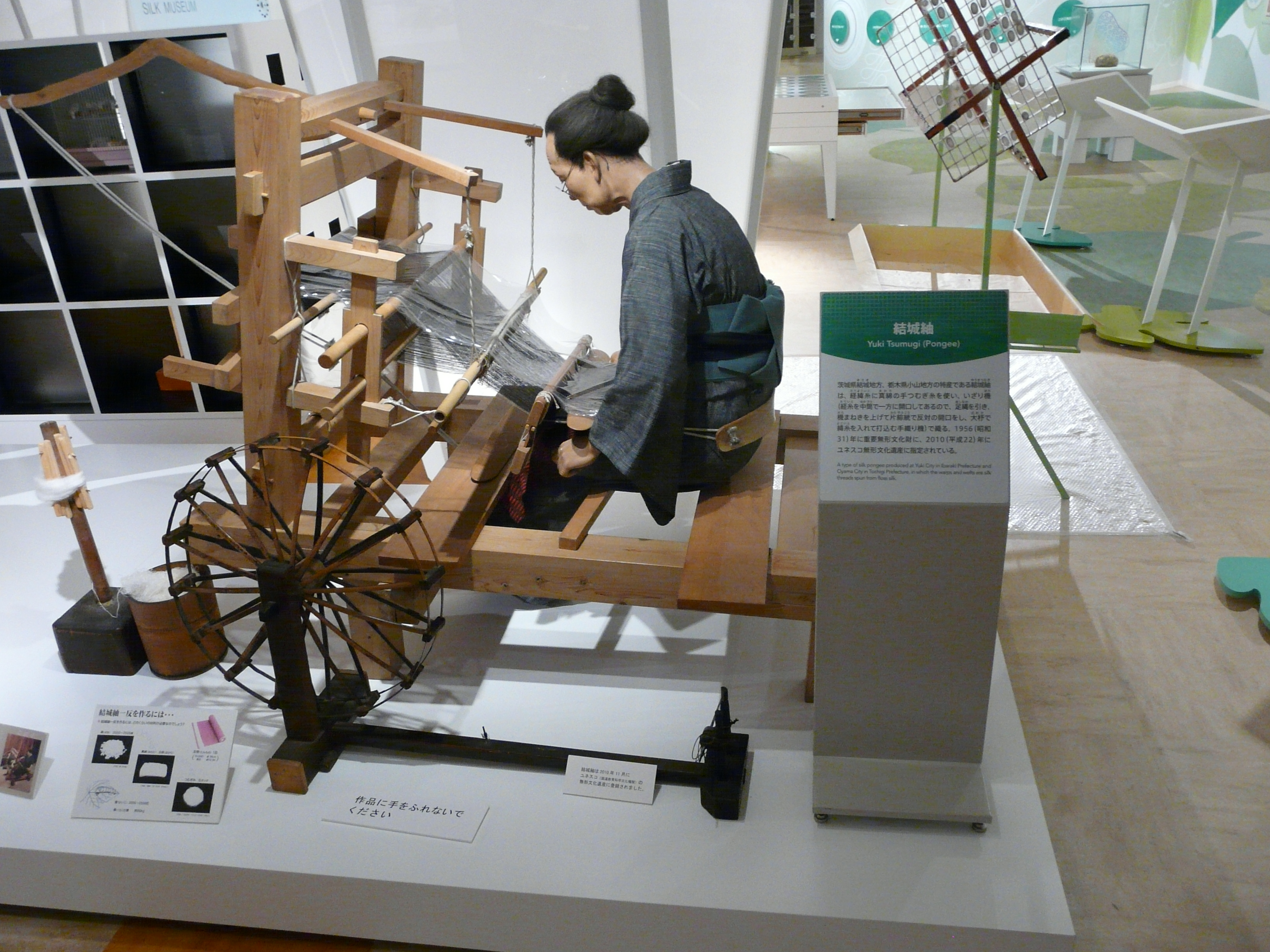
A museum model: hand-weaving tanmono

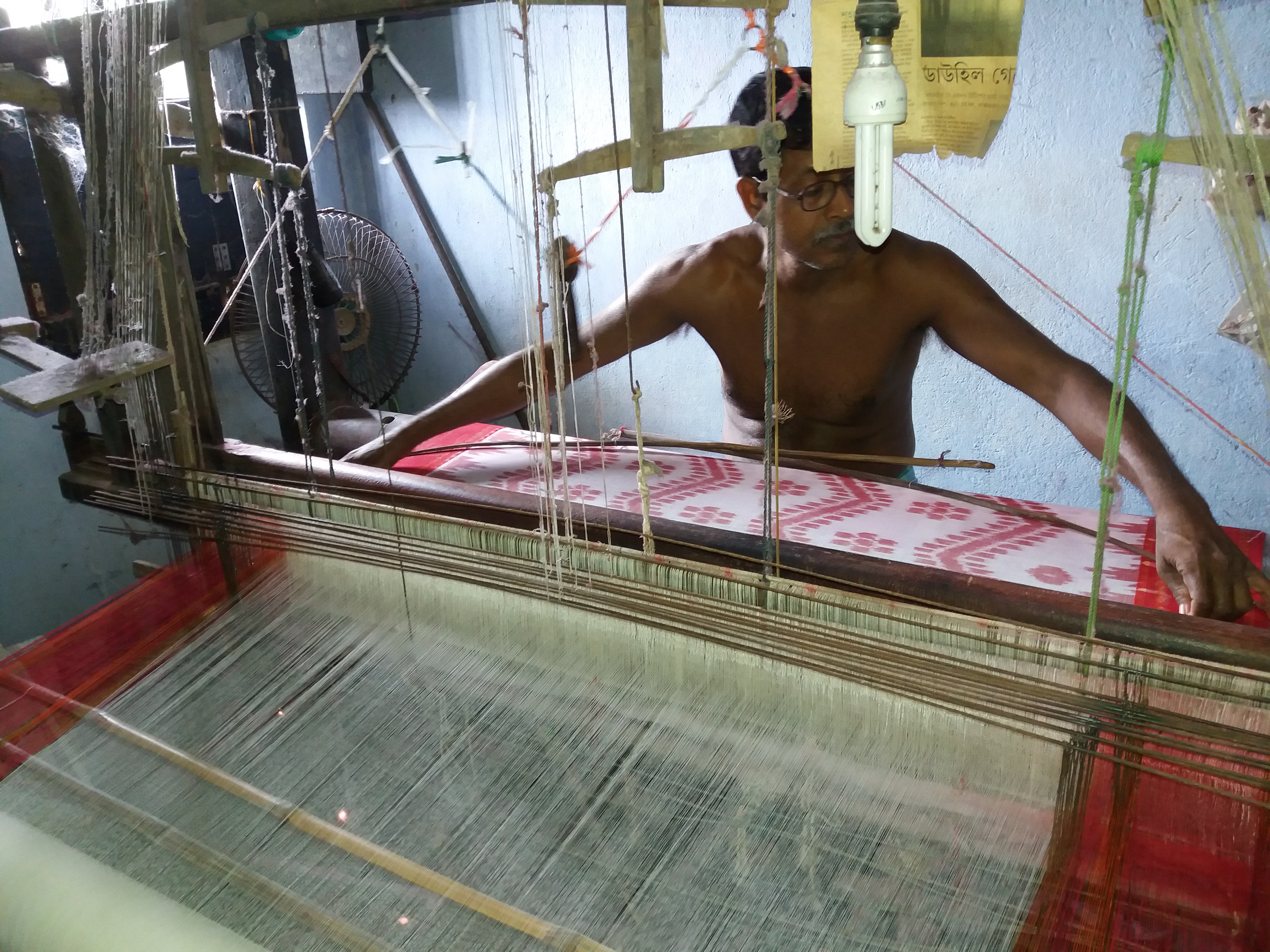
This weaver is weaving a piece of cloth about as wide as he can span. Hooghly district, West Bengal.

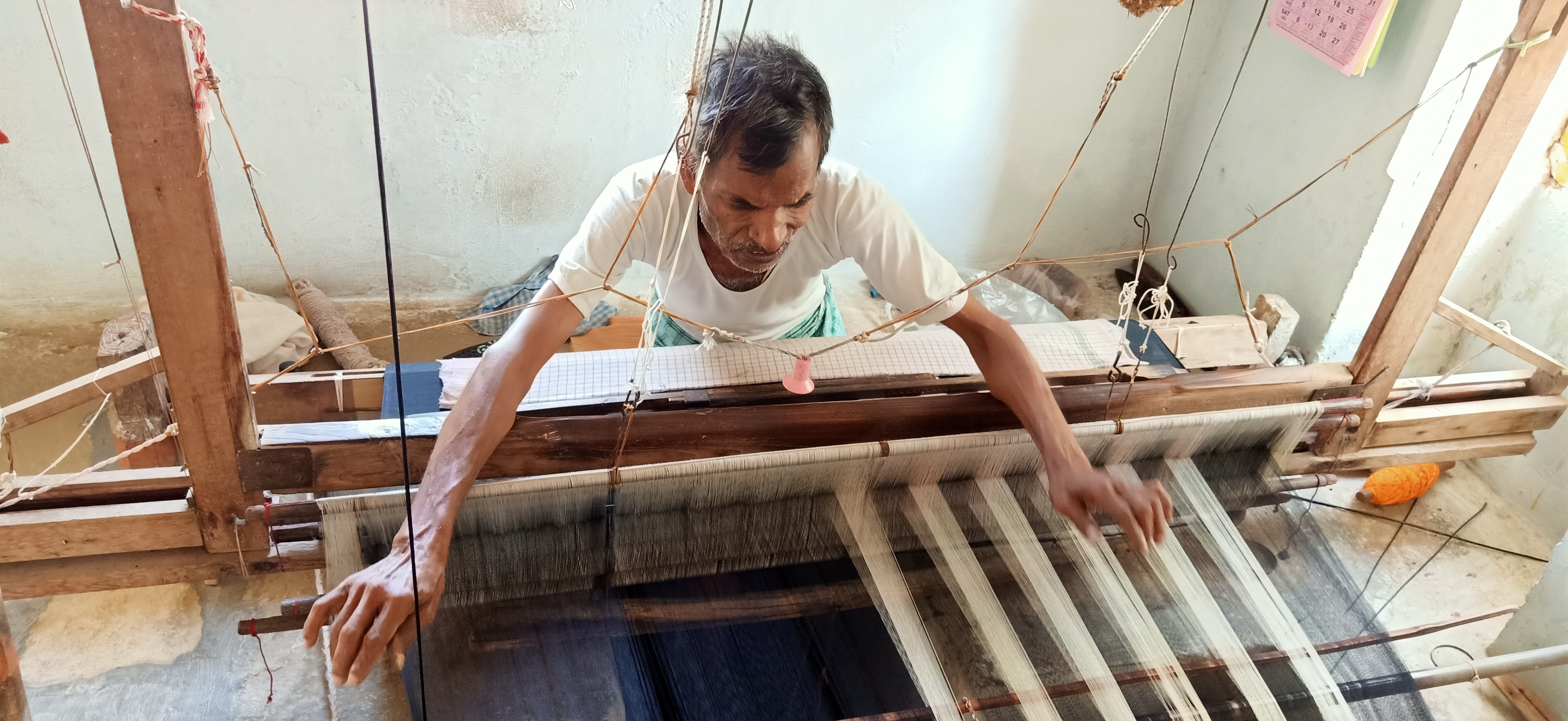
Saris often use cloth a bit wider than the wearer's waist height, and may, as here, be close to the maximum width a weaver can span. Mothkur, Telangana State, India

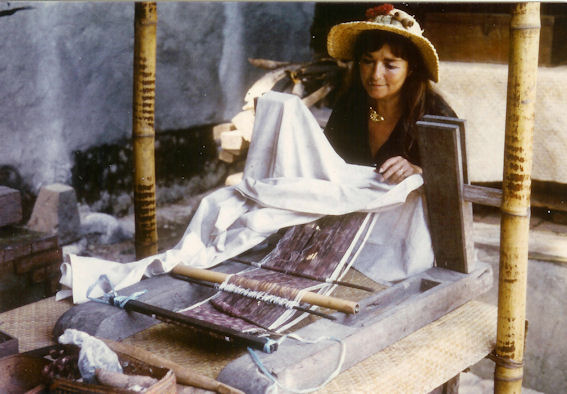
Preparing to weave geringsing on a back-strap loom. Geringseng is a culturally-significant double ikat fabric of Bali.

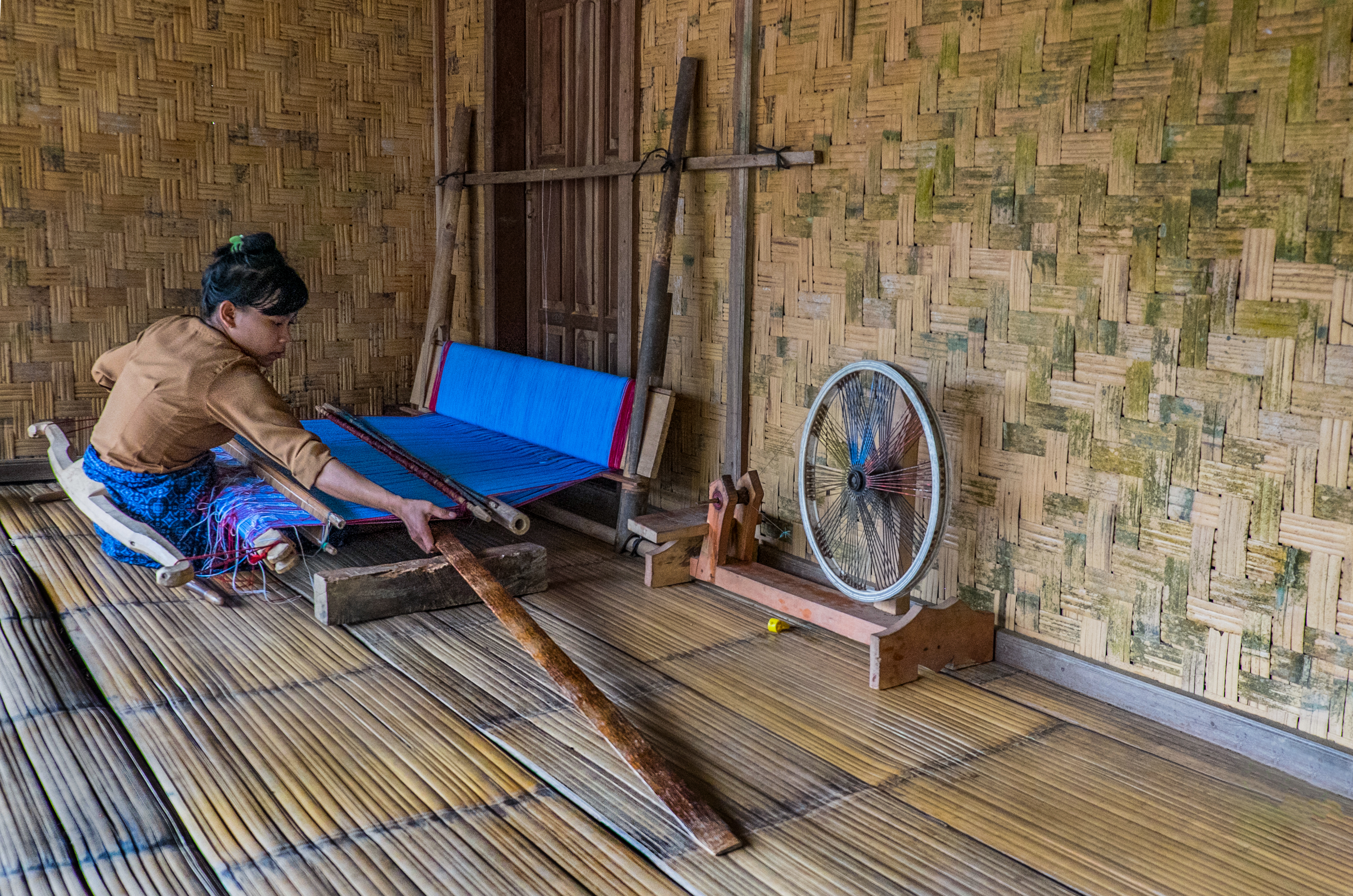
Weaving narrow cloth in Indonesia

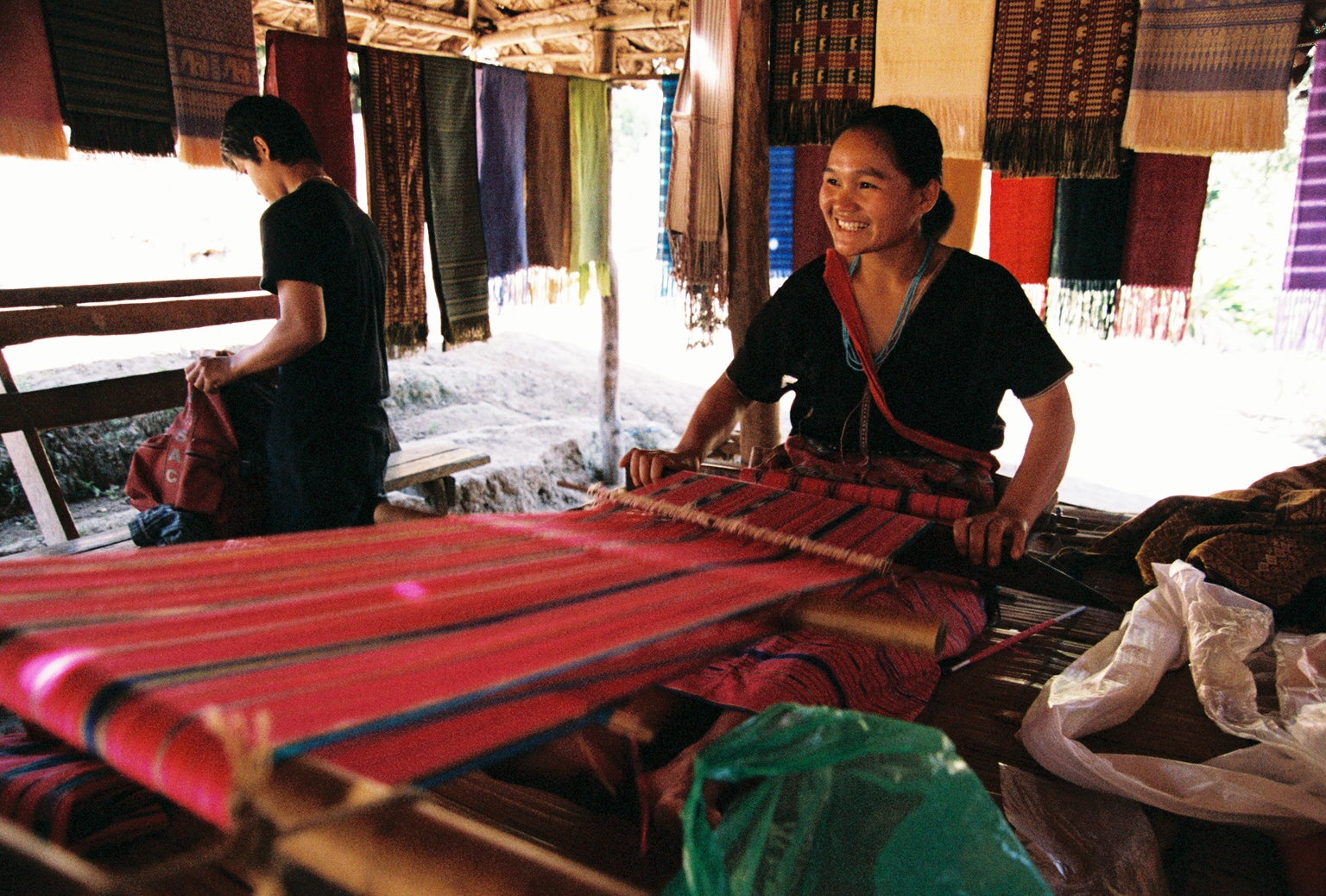
Traditional Karen weaving, 2006

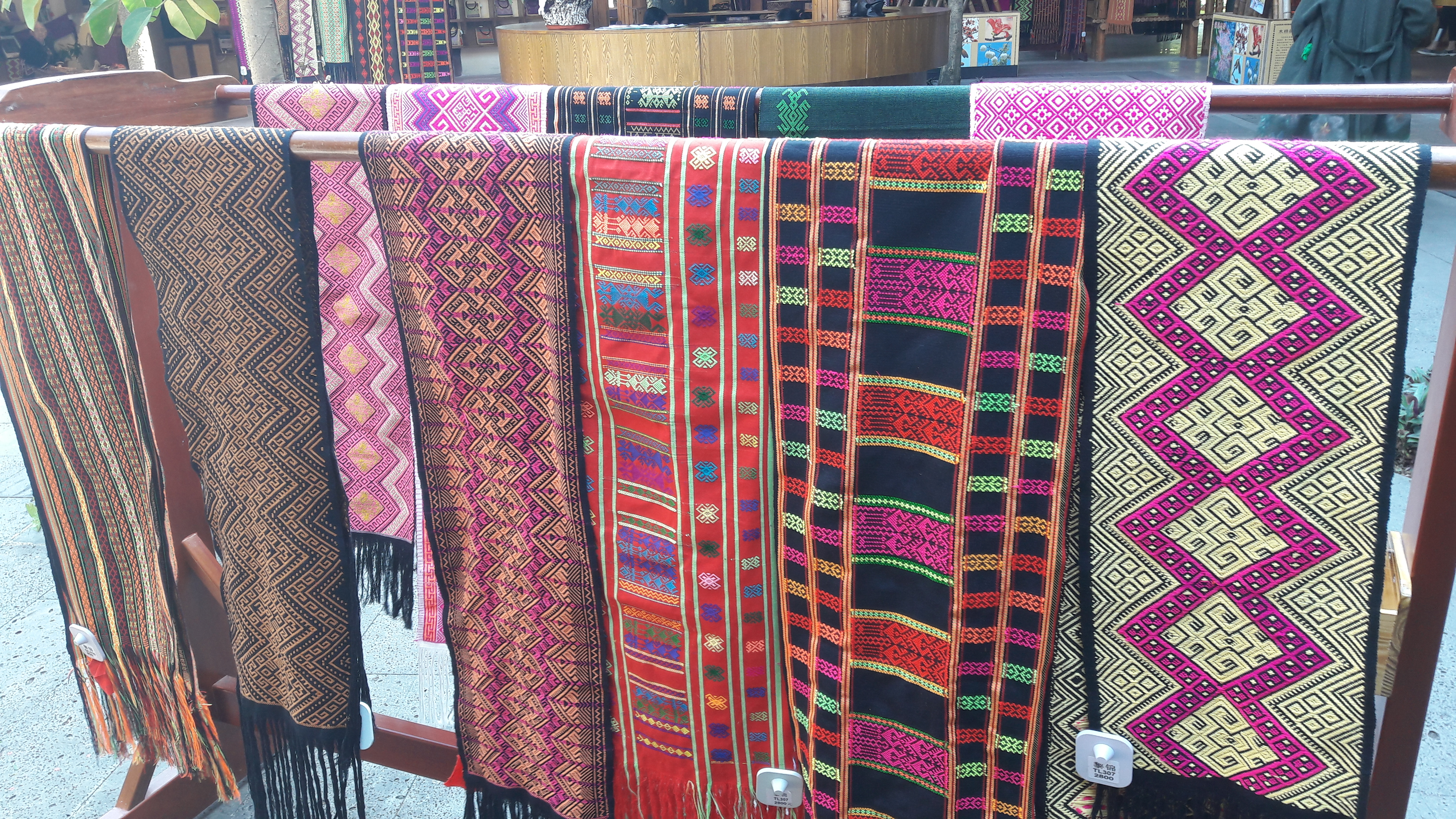
Traditional Hlai narrow cloth brocades are woven on a bamboo backstrap loom braced with the feet

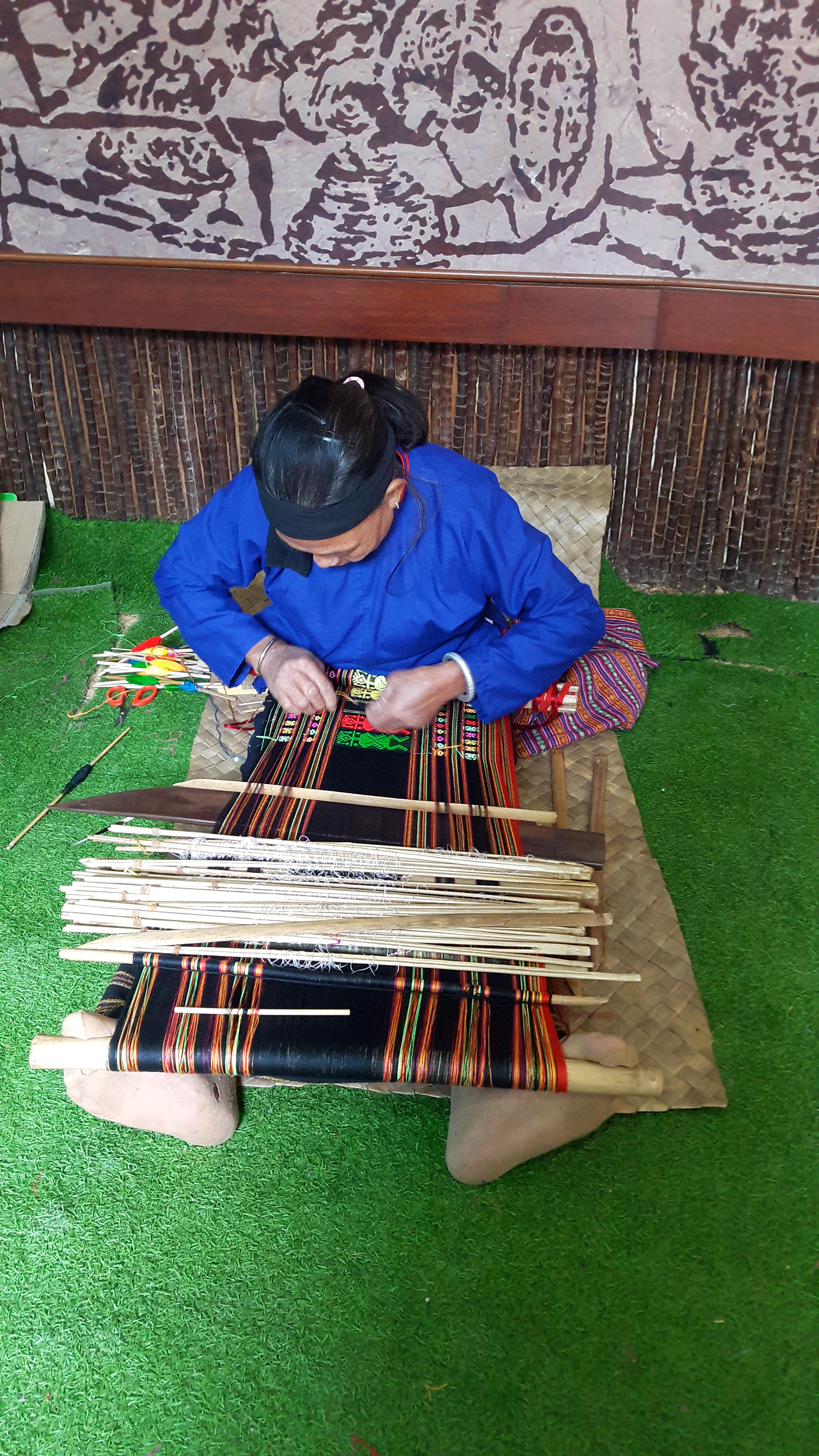
Weaving traditional Hlai narrow cloth

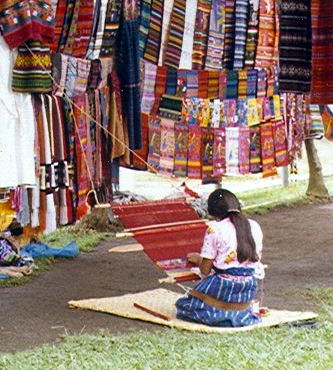
Weaving narrow cloth on a back-strap loom in Guatemala; finished narrow cloth is hung above

Traditional Chiapas weaving, Mexico.

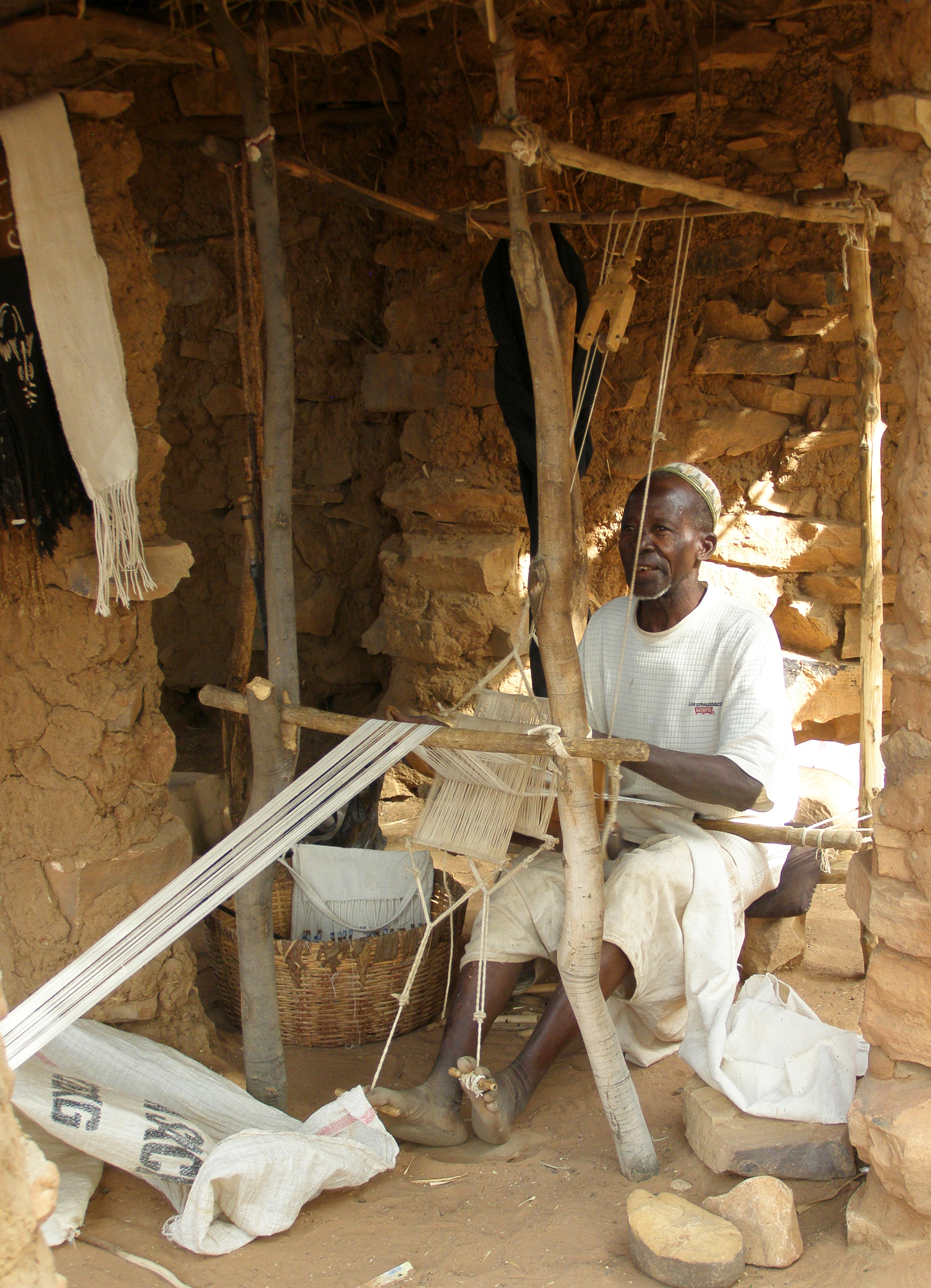
Weaving bogolan in Mali. Note toggle treadles.

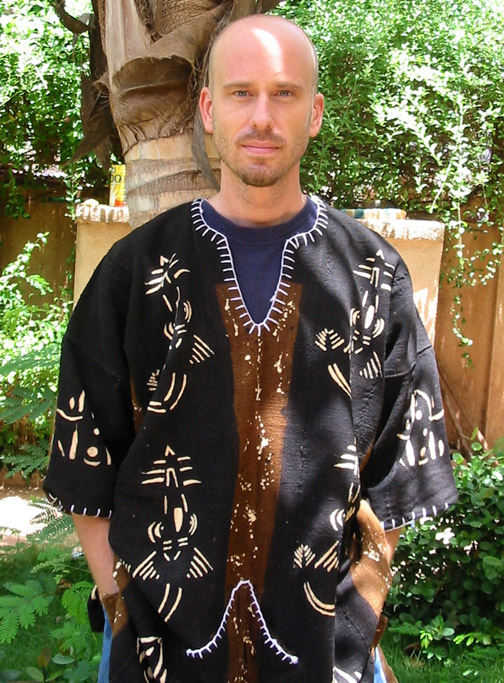
A bogolan garment.

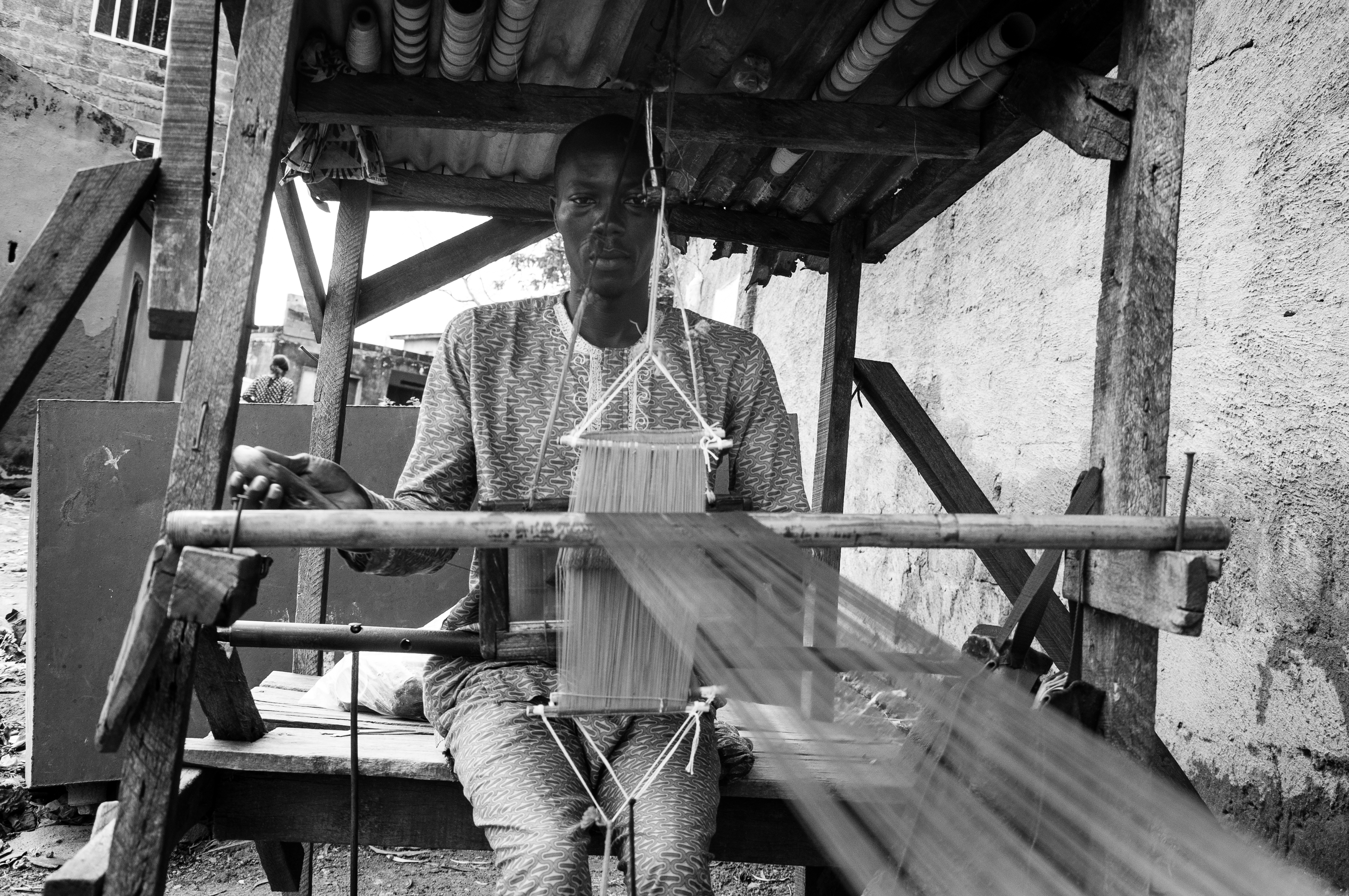
Weaving adire cloth in Nigeria

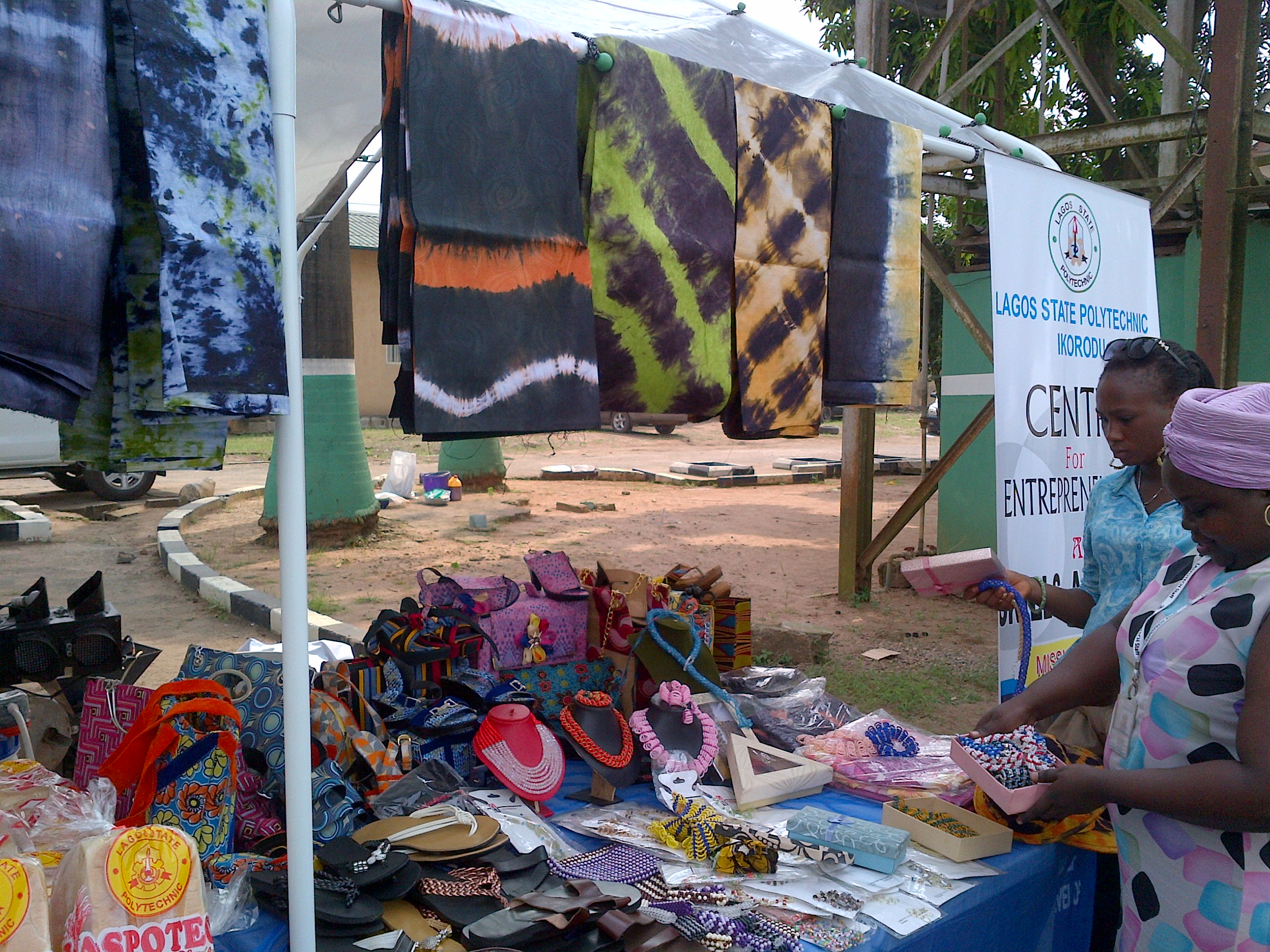
Adire cloth for sale

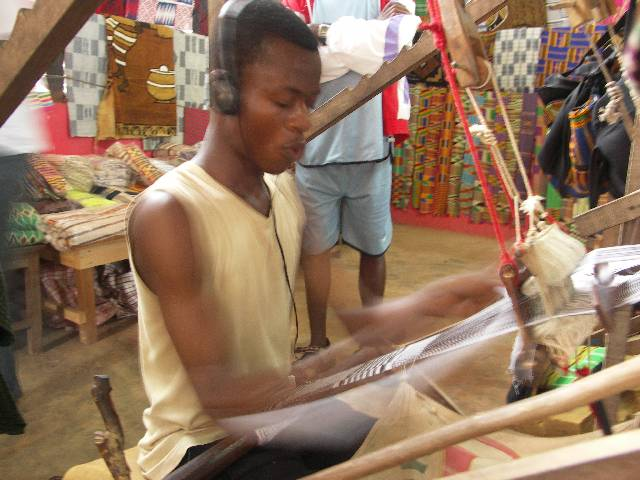
Weaving kente in Ghana.

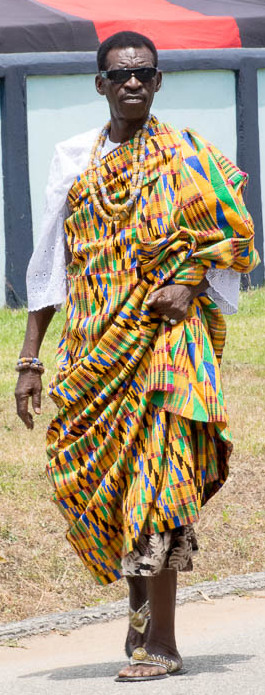
A kente garment.

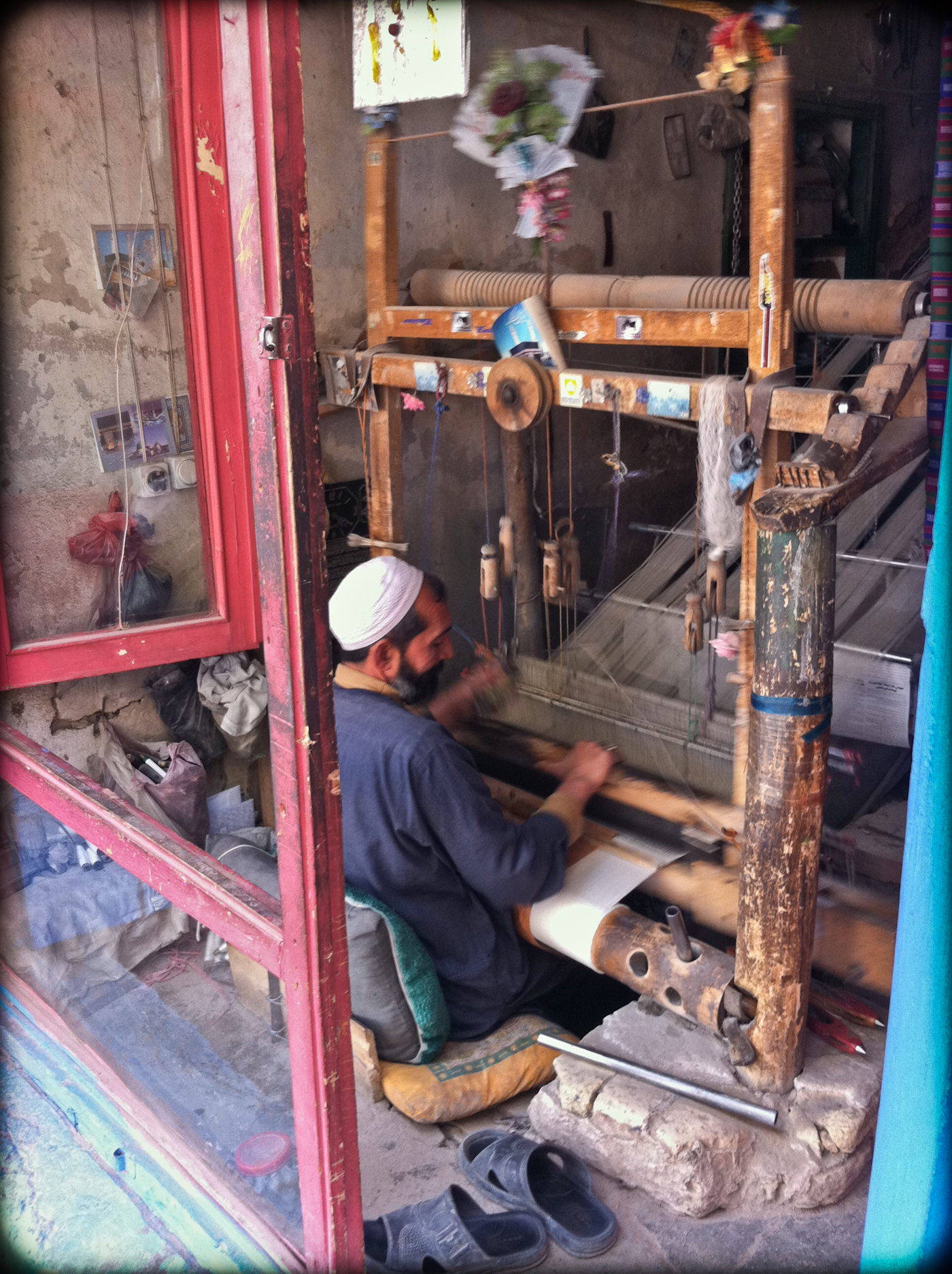
Weaving silk in Herat, Afghanistan

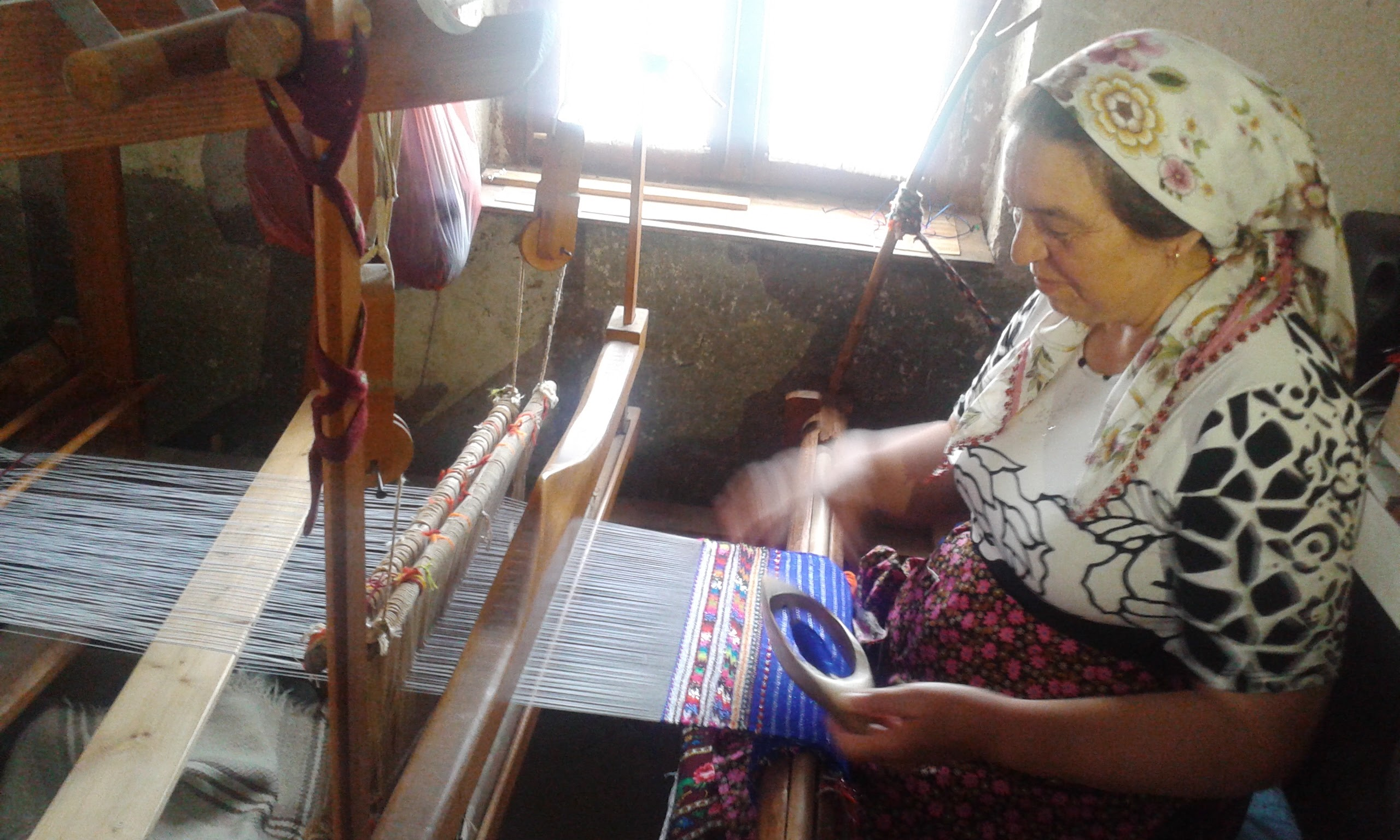
Weaving an ornamental woolen apron in Bulgaria

Weaving linen from flax stems (narration in German)

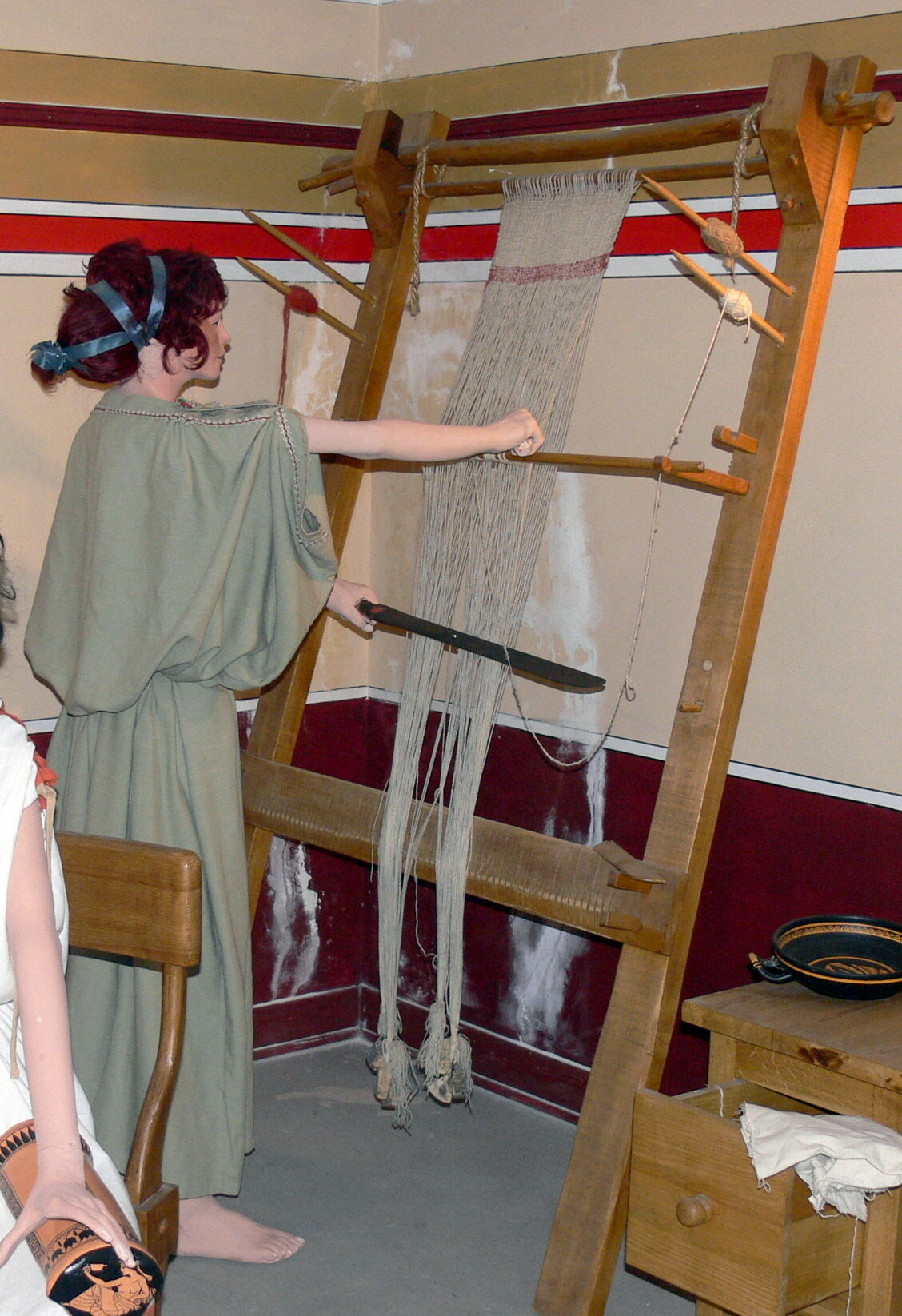
Weaving on a warp-weighted loom; replica of Ancient Rome
