= Broadcloth =

Dense, woven cloth, historically of wool

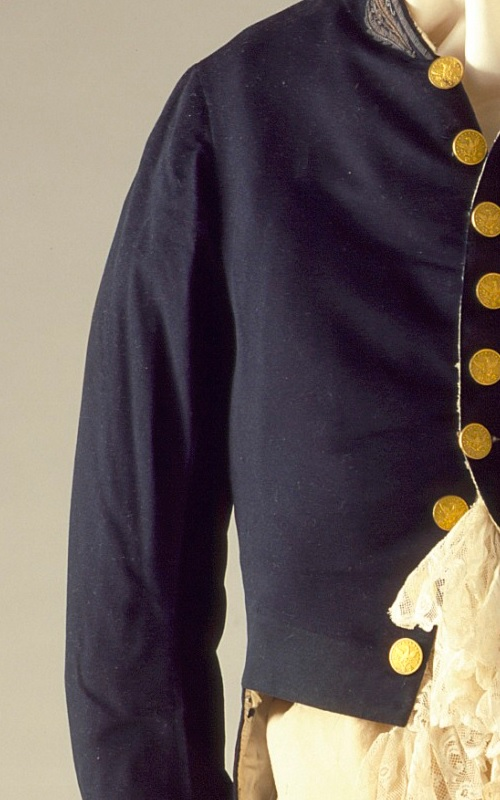
Wool broadcloth jacket, c. 1830. LACMA M.65.8a-d

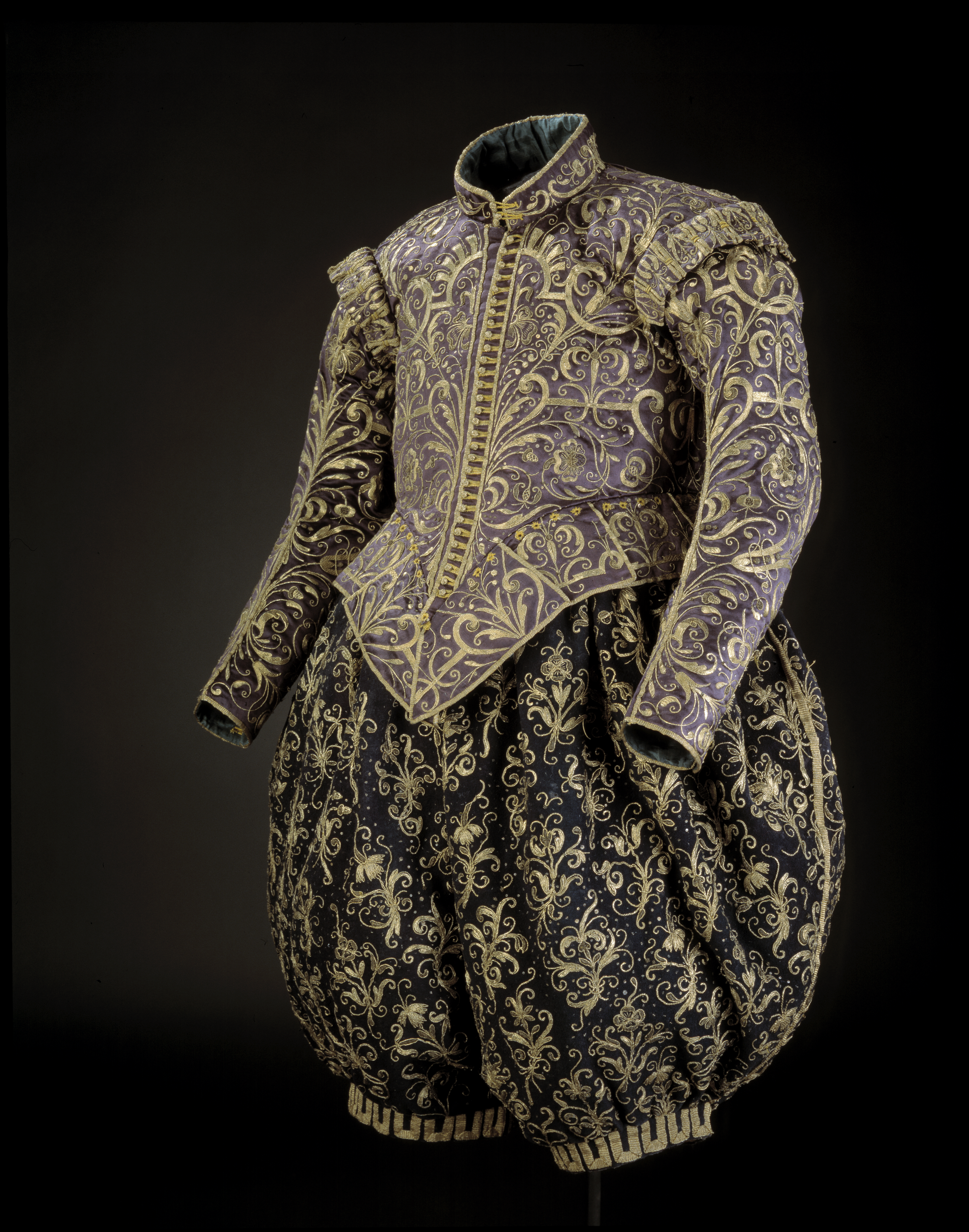
The dark purple broadcloth and gold outfit of Gustav II Adolf, King of Sweden from 1611 to 1632

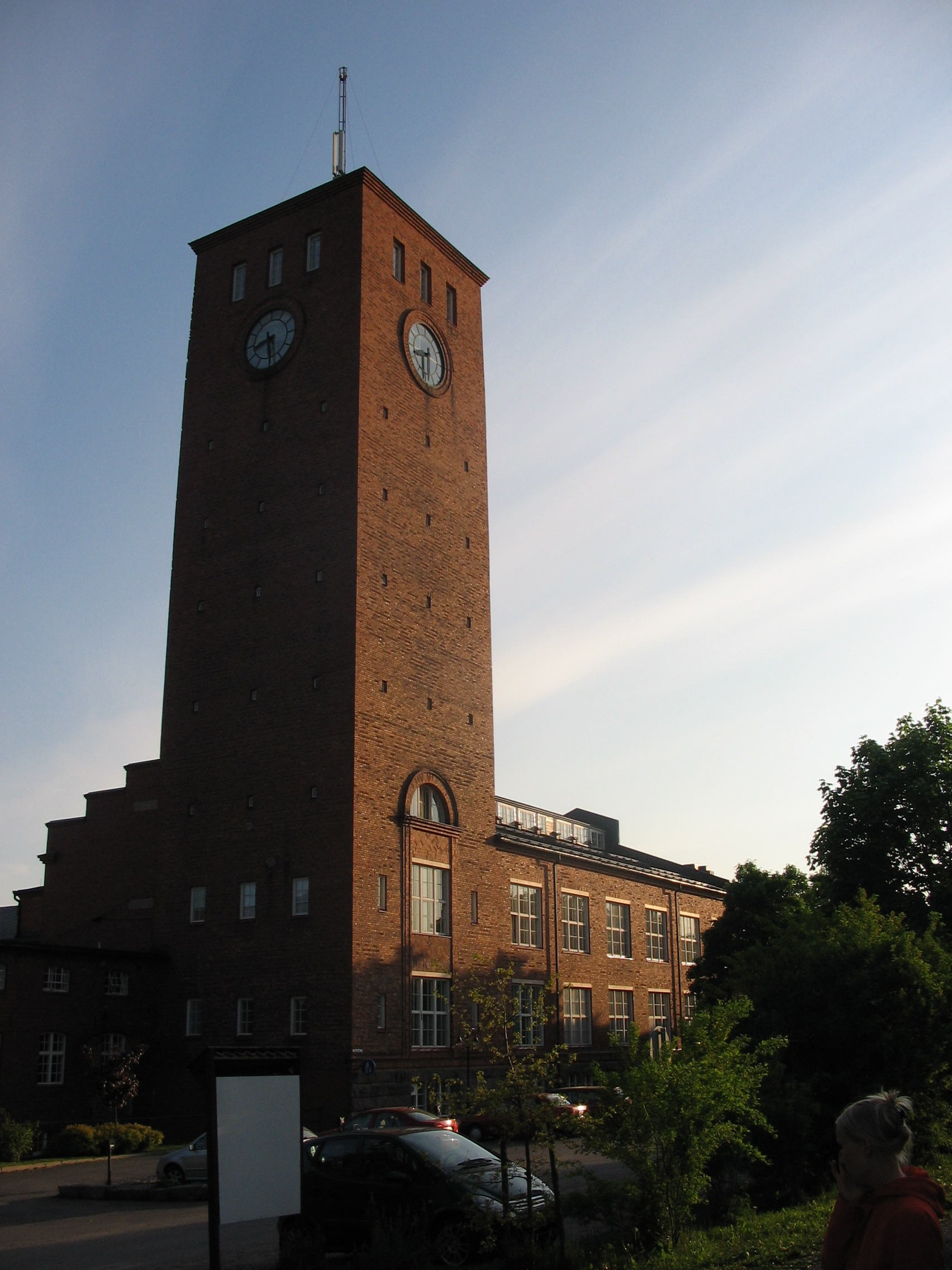
Littoinen broadcloth factory, Finland

Broadcloth is a dense, plain woven cloth, historically made of wool. The defining characteristic of broadcloth is not its finished width but the fact that it was woven much wider (typically 50 to 75% wider than its finished width) and then heavily milled (traditionally the cloth was worked by heavy wooden trip hammers in hot soapy water) in order to shrink it to the required width. The milling process draws the yarns much closer together than could be achieved in the loom and allows the individual fibres of the wool to bind together in a felting process, which results in a dense, blind-face (Note: A 'blind face' cloth is one in which, unlike twill or worsted, the underlying weave pattern cannot be seen on the surface.) cloth with a stiff drape: highly weather-resistant, hard-wearing and capable of taking a cut edge without the need for being hemmed.

The manufacturing process originated from Flanders; the type of cloth was also made in Leiden and in several parts of England at the end of the medieval period. The raw material was short staple wool, carded and spun into yarn and then woven on a broad loom to produce cloth 1.75 yards wide. After fulling, usually in a fulling mill, the fibres of the resultant cloth would felt together, resulting in a smooth surface.

== Etymology ==
The word "broadcloth" was originally used just as an antonym to "narrow cloth", but later came to mean a particular type of cloth. The 1909 Webster's dictionary (as reprinted in 1913) defines broadcloth as "A fine smooth-faced woolen cloth for men's garments, usually of double width (i.e., a yard and a half [140 cm]);—so called in distinction from woolens three quarters of a yard wide. [69 cm]", thus giving both the old breadth-based distinction and the newer definition based on the type of cloth.

Since the early 1920s, the American market has used the term "broadcloth" to describe a plain-woven, usually mercerised fabric woven with a rib and a slightly heavier filling yarn, used for shirt-making, made from cotton or a polyester-and-cotton blend. This fabric was introduced in the early 1920s as an import from the United Kingdom, where it was called poplin, but it was arbitrarily renamed "broadcloth" as it was thought that "poplin" had connotations of heaviness. Another version of this fabric, woven in rayon or polyester-and-rayon, is called fuji.

The Harmonized Tariff Schedule of the United States uses the unambiguous terms "broadwoven" and "narrow woven", with a breadth cutoff of 30 centimeters (about 12 inches). By this definition, the US government estimates that 70–75% of all cloth production globally, by weight, is broadwoven.

== Historical manufacture ==
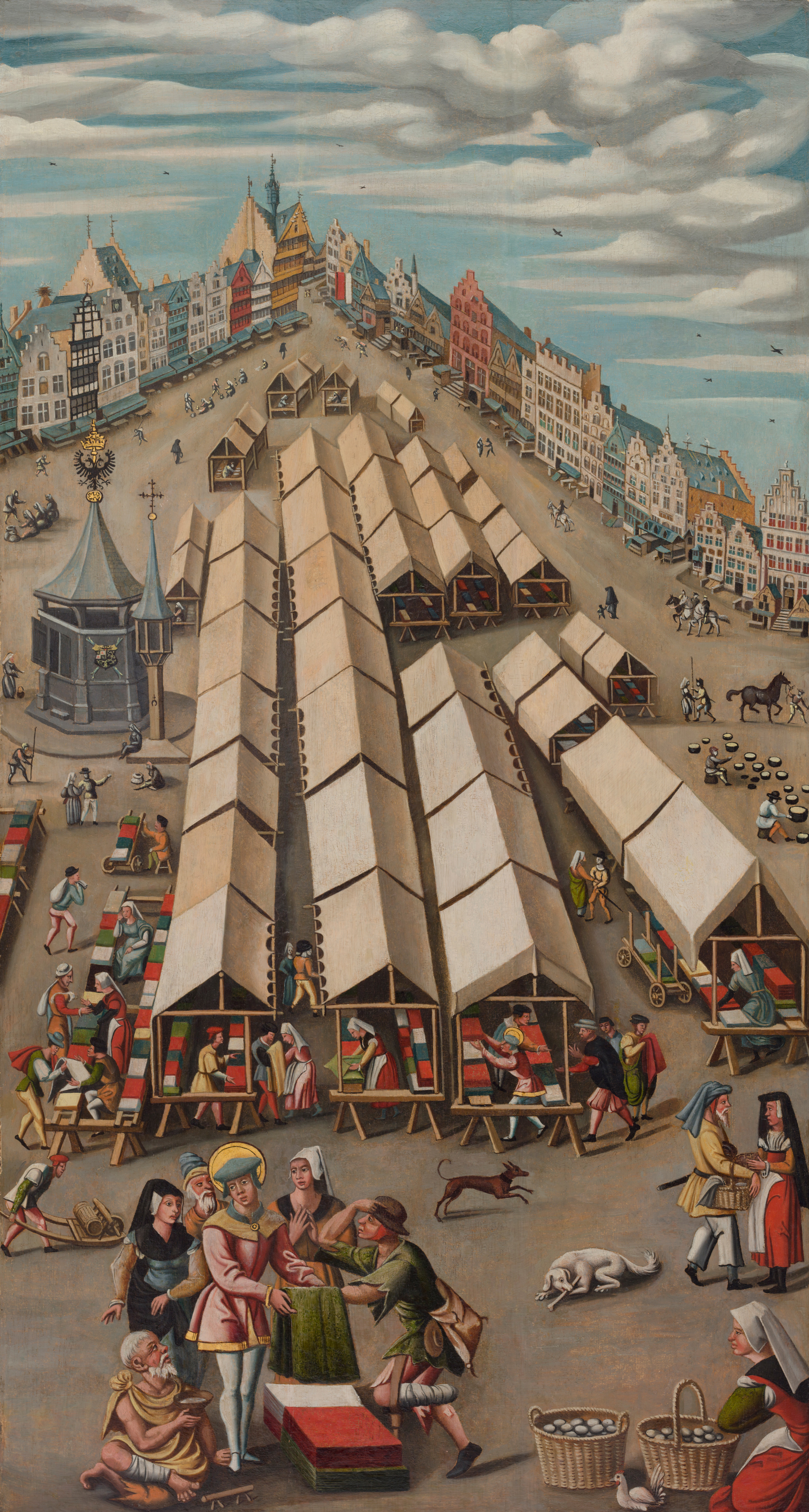
The broadcloth market at ’s-Hertogenbosch, near the historic Duchy of Brabant, circa 1530

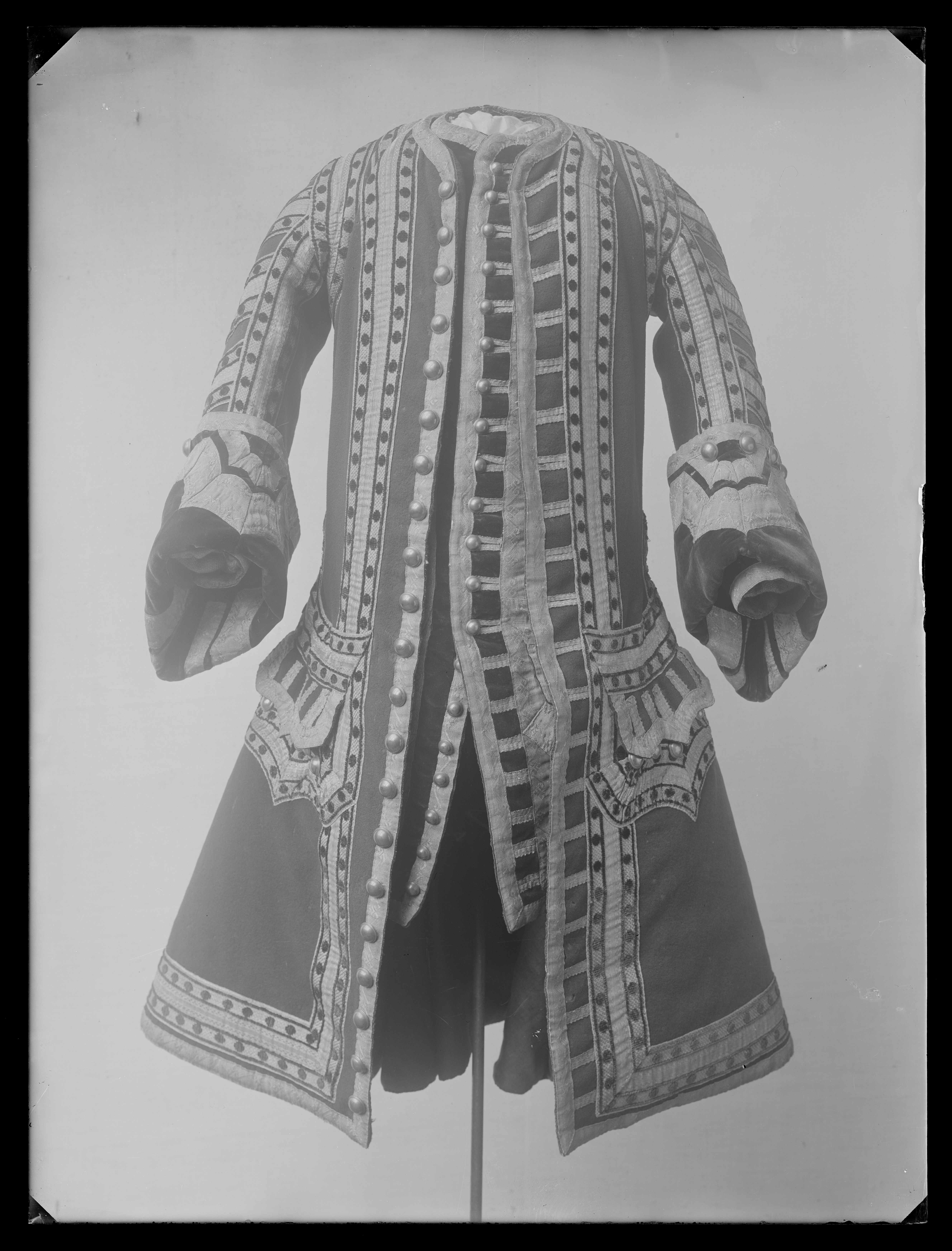
1743 coat in green broadcloth, probably Swedish

Broadcloth (Flemish Laken) was produced in the Duchy of Brabant (now Flanders) from the 11th century and throughout the medieval period.

After 1400 Leiden in Holland (now The Netherlands) became the most important place for broadcloth industry in Europe. There for the first time the production became industrialised. This means that the production process didn't take place entirely in one single factory anymore but according to a precise task allocation, where in several stages intermediate goods were produced. The entire process was strictly supervised, resulting in a constantly high quality, making Leiden broadcloth very popular. In 1417 the Hanseatic League decided that only approved broadcloth from Leiden was to be sold. From 1500, competition from other parts of Europe, especially England, grew and Leiden lost its leading role. In Italy, Florence became an important center of broadcloth industry.

Around 1500, broadcloth was made in a number of districts of England, including Essex and Suffolk in southern East Anglia, the West Country Clothing District (Gloucestershire, Wiltshire, east Somerset—sometimes with adjacent areas), at Worcester, Coventry, Cranbrook in Kent and some other places.

This was the best English cloth, and large quantities were exported by the merchants of the Company of Merchant Adventurers of London, principally to Antwerp as white (i.e. undyed) cloth. It was finished and dyed in Flanders, and then marketed throughout northern Europe. The cloths might be short (24 yards long) or long (30 yards long).

The raw material for broadcloth from Worcester was wool from the Welsh border counties of Herefordshire and Shropshire, known as Lemster (i.e. Leominster) wool. That for the West Country came from the Cotswolds. In both cases, the high quality was the result of the comparatively poor pasture, which (probably aided by selective breeding) led the sheep to grow wool with the desired qualities.

English exports of broadcloth reached their highest level in the mid 16th century, after which some regions began producing other kinds of cloth. Difficulties were encountered in export markets in the mid-1610s, partly due to currency difficulties in eastern Europe, and partly to the ill-conceived Cockayne Project. Broadcloth production, thus declined in the 17th century.

Worcester remained a centre for the production of white broadcloth. Other areas, such as Ludlow and parts of the Cotswolds started to produce similar cloth, known as 'Worcesters'. The market suffered major setback in the 18th century, when the trade of the Levant Company with Turkey was obstructed by French competition.From this time, the production of broadcloth lost its importance.

== Types of broadcloth ==
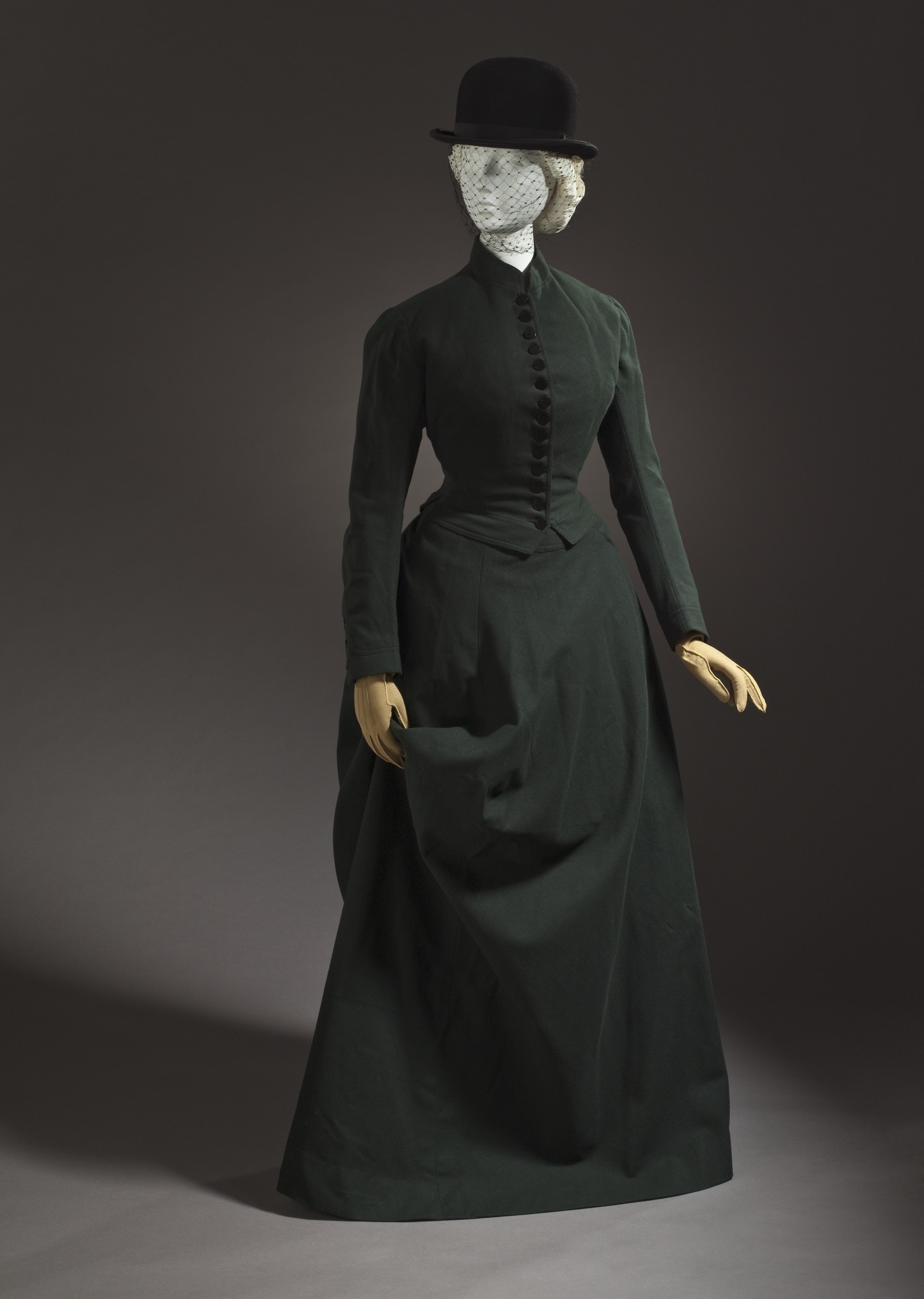
1878 woman's riding habit/hunting dress in dark green habit cloth. Scotland. LACMA M.2007.211.779.1a-b

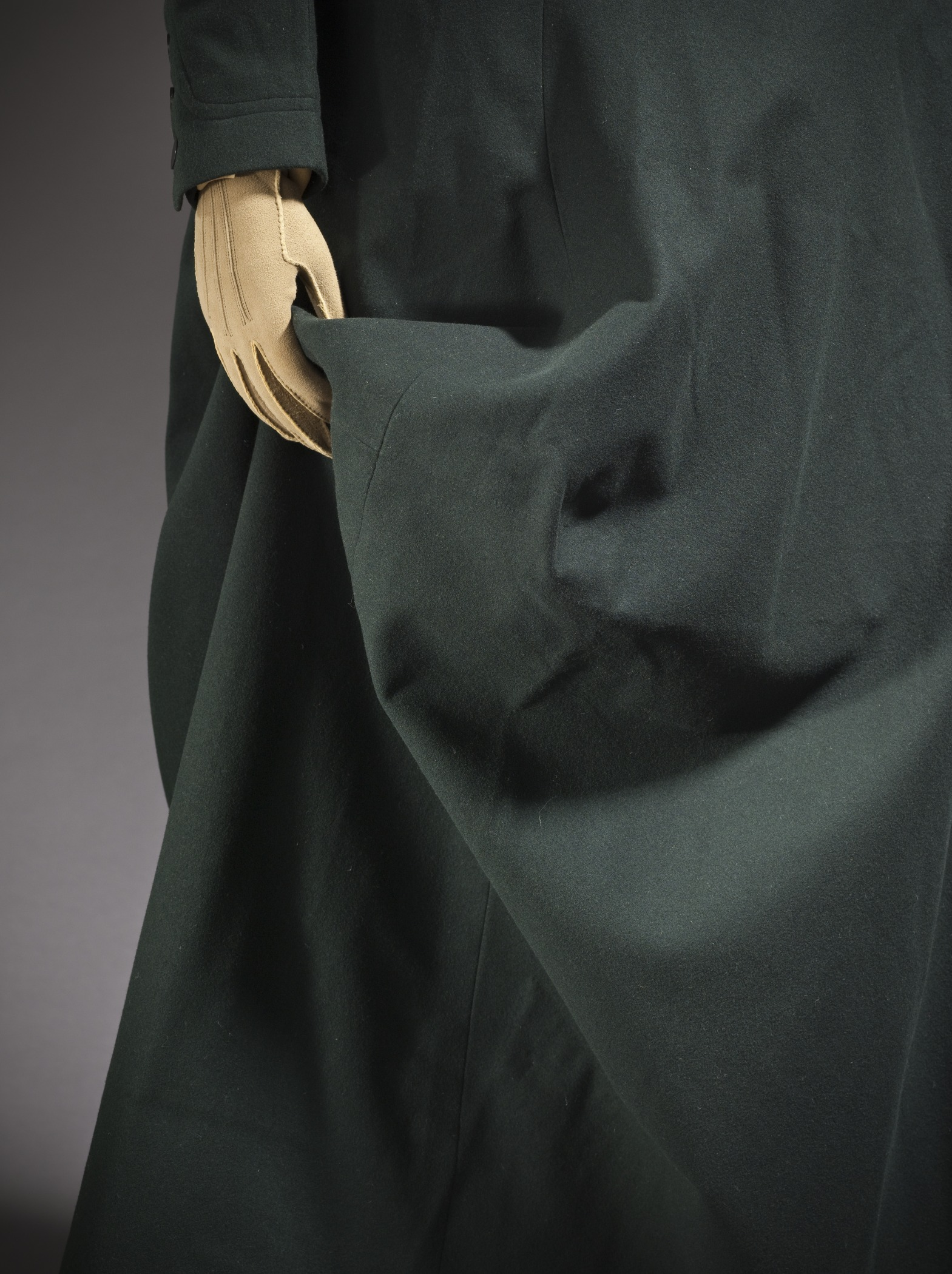
Drape of the cloth in the above riding habit

- Banat—Wool broadcloth made in India.
- Bridgwater (1450–1500)—A lighter weight broadcloth made in England, Scotland and Wales.
- Castor—Overcoat-weight woolen broadcloth.
- Cealtar (Irish Gaelic)—thick grey broadcloth
- Dunster (early 14th century)—broadcloth specifically made in Somerset
- Georgian cloth (c.1806)
- Haberjet (Middle Ages)—A coarse wool broadcloth, made in England during the Medieval period, and associated with monks.
- Habit cloth—British-made fine wool broadcloth typically used for women's riding habits.
- Lady's cloth—lighter weight broadcloth, originally made in light shades.
- Poole cloth (19th century onwards)—A broadcloth with a clear finish, named after the tailoring establishment Henry Poole & Co (founded 1806).
- Suclat—A European-made cotton broadcloth popular in the East Indian market.
- Superfine (18th century onwards)—merino broadcloth used for men's tailoring.
- Tami—Chinese-made broadcloth.
- Taunton (16th century)—Originally made in Taunton, and available in medium or coarse grade, with a weight of 11oz. per yard, which was fixed by law.
- Tavestock (c. 1200–1350)
- Western dozen (16th century)—Alternative name for tavestock.

== Modern uses ==
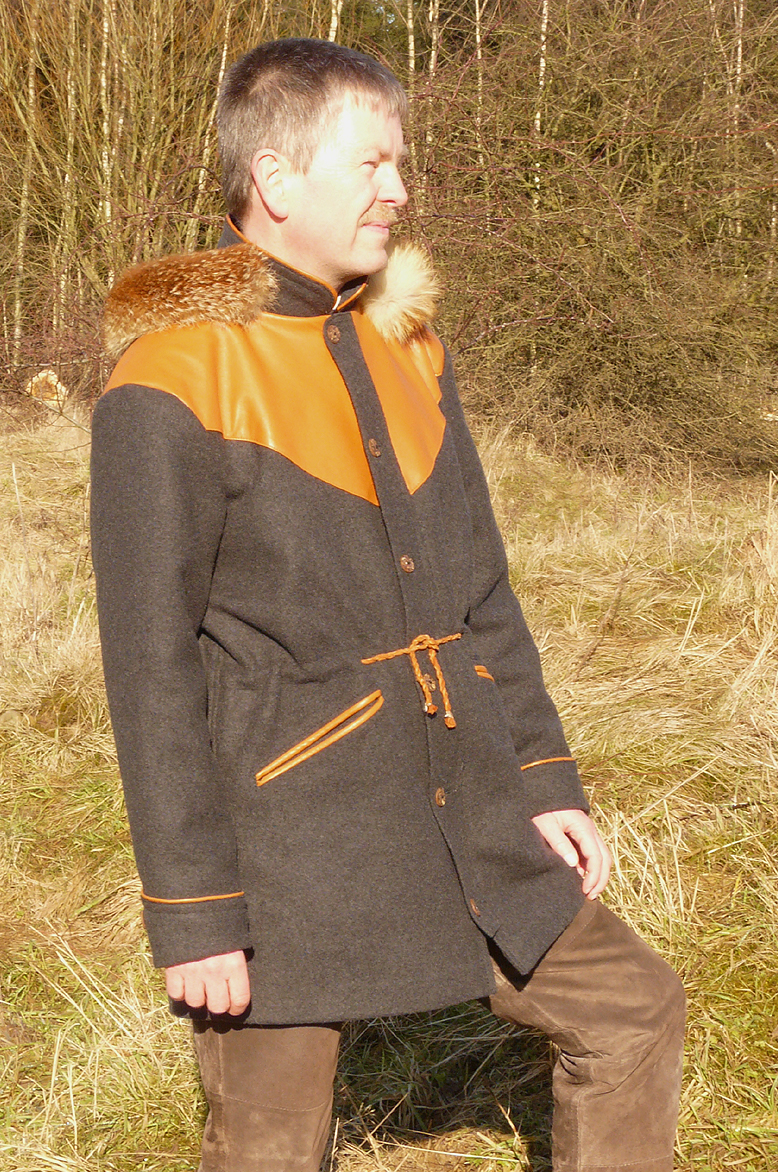
Broadcloth coat, 2009

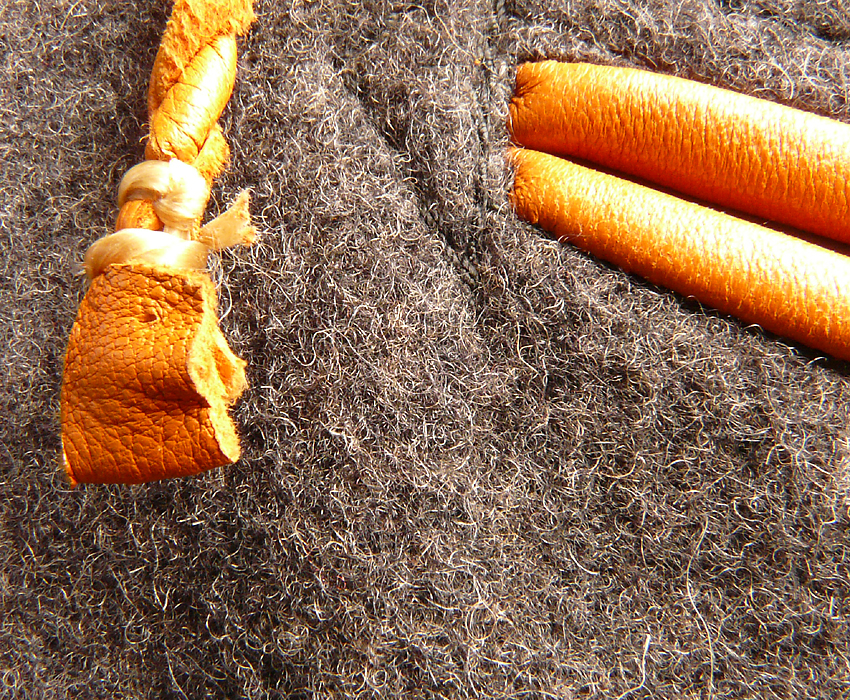
Close-up of broadcloth surface, with corner of pocket and end of drawstring for scale, photographed at 6× magnification

Wool broadcloth with its felted, velvet-like feel, has been used to upholster furniture and car interiors.

== Bibliography ==
- Lewandowski, Elizabeth J. (2011). The complete costume dictionary. Lanham, Md.: Scarecrow Press, Inc. ISBN 9780810877856.
- Pedersen, Kathrine Vestergard; Nosch, Marie-Louise B., eds. (2009). The Medieval Broadcloth: Changing Trends in Fashions, Manufacturing and Consumption. Oxford: Oxbow Books. ISBN 978-1-84217-381-7.
- Ponting, Kenneth G. (1971). The Woollen Industry of South-West England. Bath: A. M. Kelley. ISBN 0-678-07751-7.
- Thursfield, Sarah (2001). The Medieval Tailor's Assistant. New York, New York: Costume & Fashion Press. ISBN 0-89676-239-4.
