= Weights and Measures Acts (UK) =

Laws of the British Parliament determining the regulation of weights and measures

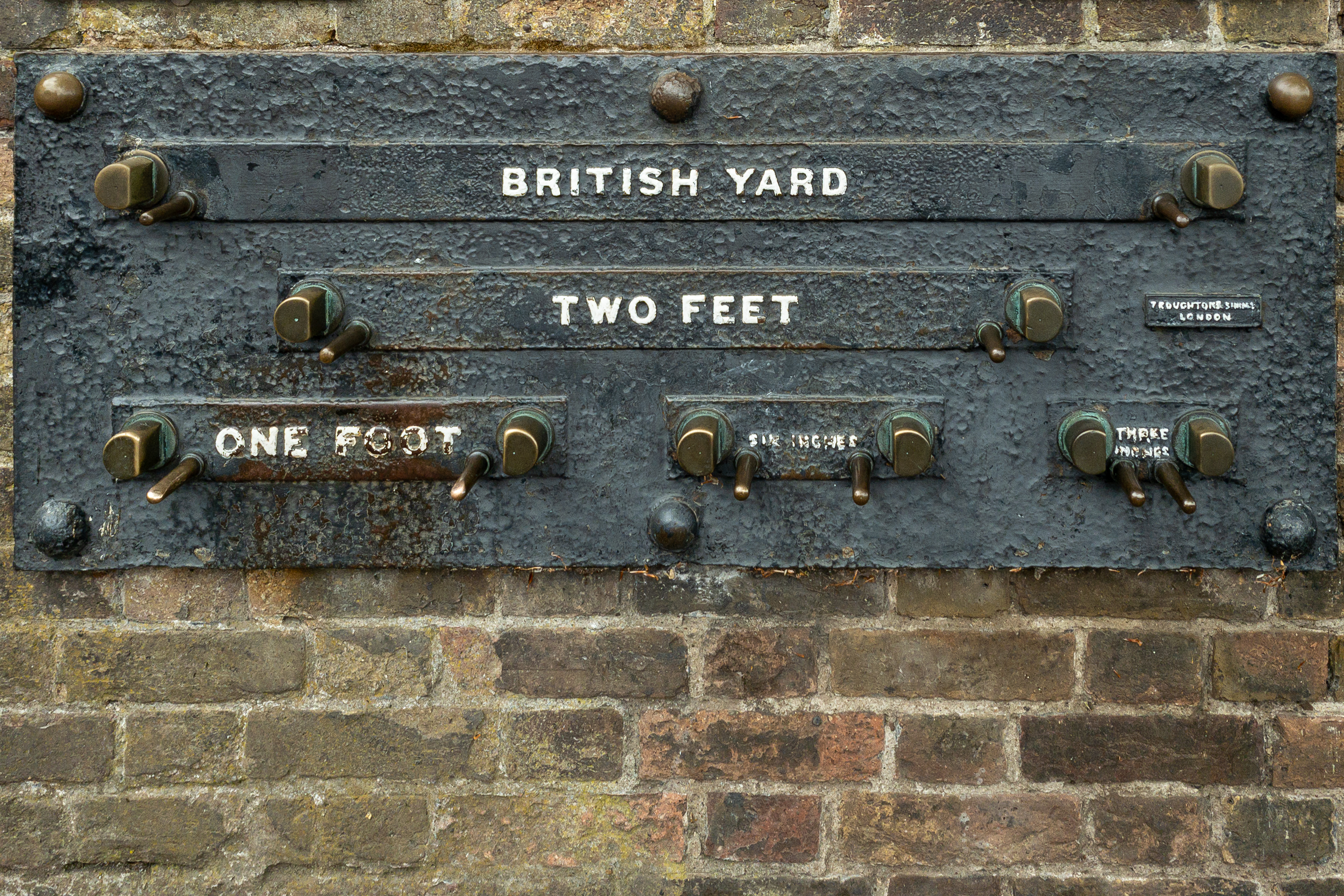
The informal public imperial measurement standards erected at the Royal Observatory, Greenwich, London, in the 19th century: 1 British yard, 2 feet, 1 foot, 6 inches, and 3 inches. The inexact monument was designed to permit rods of the correct measure to fit snugly into its pins at an ambient temperature of 62°F (16 2/3°C).

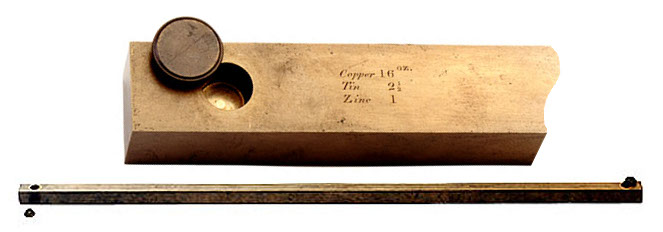
Bronze Yard No.11, the official standard of length for the United States between 1855 and 1892, when the Treasury Department formally adopted a metric standard. Bronze Yard No.11 was forged to be an exact copy of the British Imperial Standard Yard, which was ruined in 1834 during the Burning of Parliament. Both were line standards: the yard was defined by the distance at 62°F between two fine lines drawn on gold plugs (closeup, top) installed in recesses near each end of the bar.

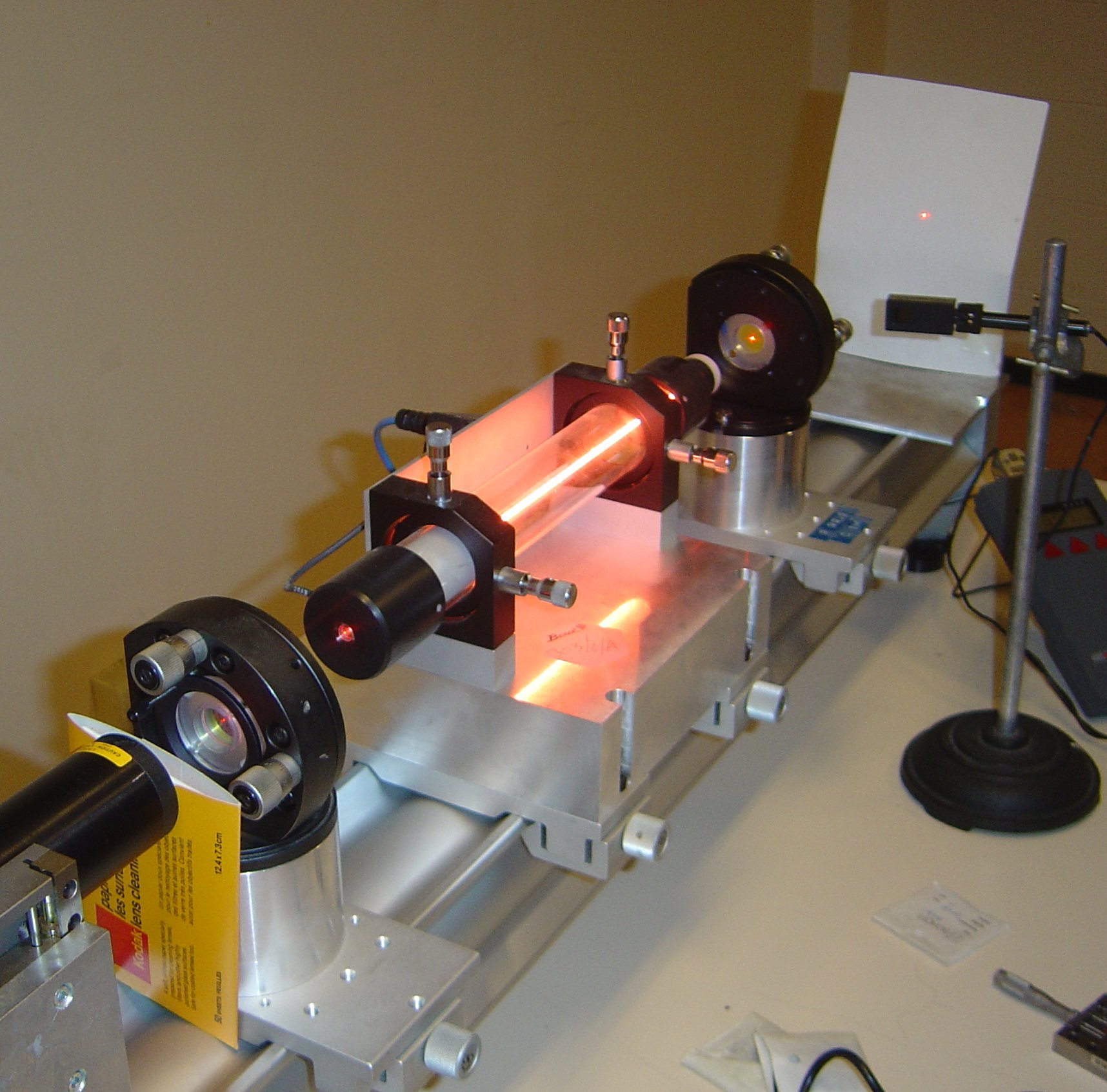
A helium–neon laser at the Kastler-Brossel Laboratory at Pierre and Marie Curie University, Paris. Britain's metric and imperial units of length and volume are now all ultimately derived from measurements of the speed of light in vacuum.

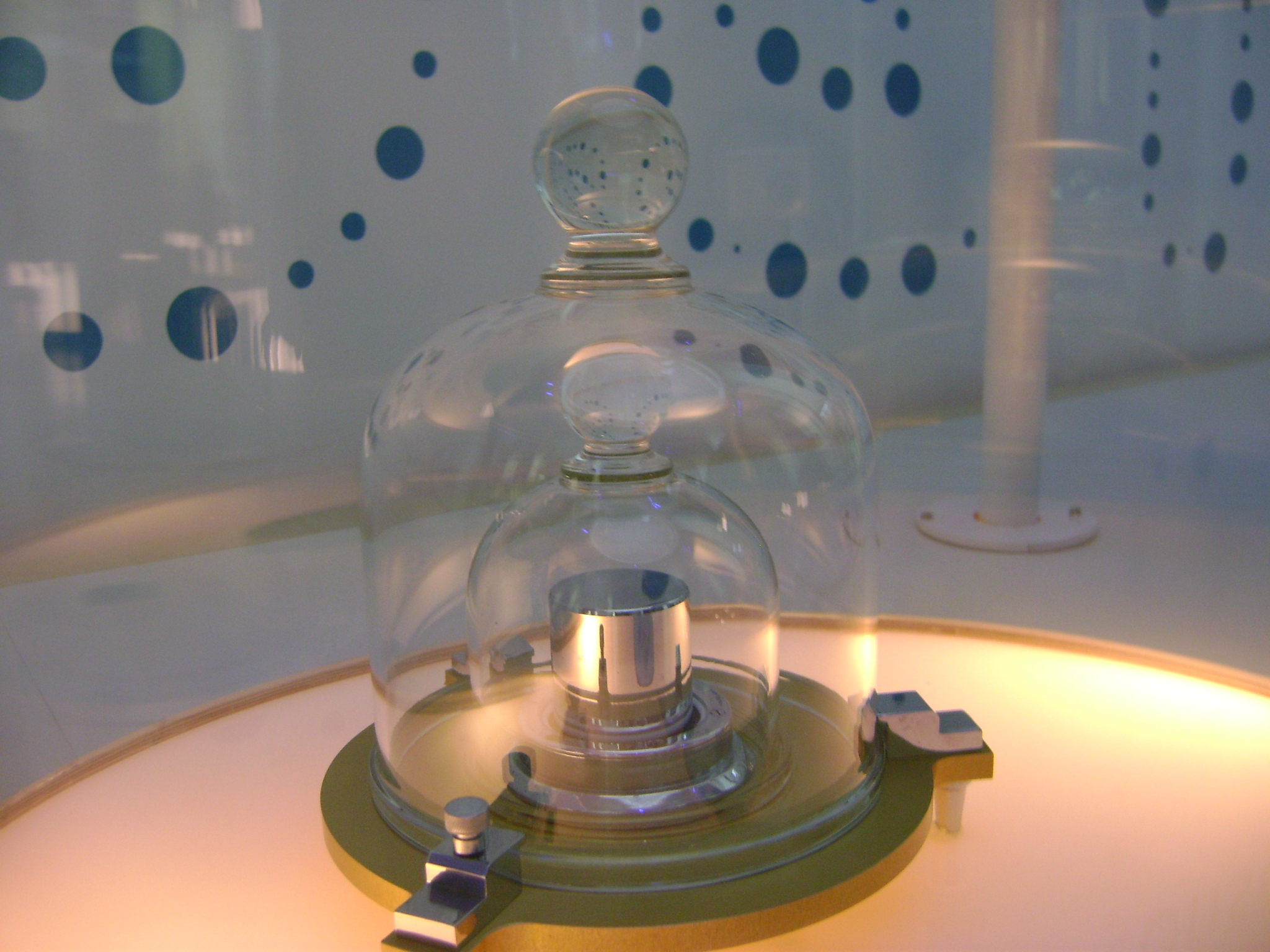
Before the 2019 revision of the SI, Britain's units of mass were derived from national standards periodically reverified against the platinum and iridium international prototype of the kilogram stored beneath two bell jars in a basement vault at the International Bureau of Weights and Measures's headquarters at Pavillon de Breteuil in Paris. A display replica shown at Paris's Cité des Sciences et de l'Industrie is shown here. The modern kilogram is defined by a fundamental property of matter.

Weights and Measures Acts are acts of the Parliament of the United Kingdom determining the regulation of weights and measures. It also refers to similar statutes of the kingdoms of England and Scotland and the medieval Welsh states. The earliest of these were originally untitled but were given descriptive glosses or titles based upon the monarch under whose reign they were promulgated. Several omnibus modern acts have the short title "Weights and Measures Act" and are distinguished by the year of their enactment.

== Background ==
There have been many laws concerned with weights and measures in the United Kingdom or parts of it over the last 1,000 or so years. The acts may catalogue lawful weights and measures, prescribe the mechanism for inspection and enforcement of the use of such weights and measures and may set out circumstances under which they may be amended. Modern legislation may, in addition to specific requirements, set out circumstances under which the incumbent minister may amend the legislation by means of statutory instruments. Prior to the Weights and Measures Act 1985, weights and measures acts were only concerned with trade law where the weight or size of the goods being traded was important. The 1985 act, however, had a broader scope, encompassing all aspects covered by the European Economic Community (EEC) European Commission directive 80/181/EEC.

As of 15 May 2026, the current primary legislation in the United Kingdom is the 1985 act, which was last amended by statutory instrument in 2025. Statutory instruments made under the authority of the act do not amend the act per se, but regulate particular areas covered by the act.

The act is currently enforced by the 200 Trading Standards offices managed by local authorities around the country. Definitions of units of measurements and the technical equipment relating to weights and measures are provided by the National Measurement Office, an agency of the Department for Business, Innovation and Skills.

=== Statute measure ===
Historically, many units had various customary definitions—by locality or trade, for example. Where these units also had a standard, legally defined definition, such as given in a weights and measures act, this was known as the statute measure. So a land area might be given as 24 acres—statute measure, to clarify that it was the acre defined in statute, rather than a customary acre of a different size, that was being used. Units that had statute-defined measures as well as customary measures were the acre, mile, perch, pole and ton. The level of legal enforcement of statute measures achieved between the mid nineteenth and the beginning of the twentieth centuries meant that only "statute mile" and "statute ton" needed qualifying beyond then. The statute mile still needed to be differentiated from the nautical mile, but the others, and the term "statute measure" itself, are now only used in a historical context.

== Metric units of measure ==
The Weights and Measures (Metric System) Act 1897 (60 & 61 Vict. c. 46) provided that metric units could be used in addition to the traditional imperial units for purposes of trade. In practice, the actual choice of units was restricted by price marking orders which listed packaging sizes and pricing structures that might be used in specific circumstances. For example, as of April 2012, wine for consumption on premises may only be sold in 125, 175, and 250 mL glasses while draught beer may only be sold as 1/3, 1/2, or 2/3 pint and integer multiples of 1/2 pint. Prior to 1973, when the United Kingdom joined the EEC, such specifications were almost all in imperial units.

As part of its attempt to harmonise units of measure between the member states of its Internal Market, the European Commission (EC) issued directive 80/181/EEC which set out the units of measure that should be used for what it called "economic, public health, public safety, and administrative" purposes. To comply with this directive, the Weights and Measures Act 1985 extended the scope of Trading Standards responsibilities from just matters related to trade to all aspects of the directive. For example, it was the Trading Standards Office that criticised the use of sub-standard weighing machines in NHS hospitals.

To help ease the EC's desired transition from sole use of imperial units to sole use of metric units, the directive permitted the use of what were termed "supplementary indicators"—the continued use of imperial units alongside the metric units catalogued by the directive (dual labelling). The initial intention was to prohibit dual labelling after the end of 1989, with metric units only being allowed after that date. This deadline was later extended: first to the end of 1999, then to the end of 2009. Finally, in 2007, the European Union (EU, as it had become) and the EC confirmed that the UK would be permitted to continue indefinitely to use imperial units such as pints, miles, pounds and ounces as at present. The Gloucestershire County Council Trading Standards Department confirmed the EU ruling that the previous deadline for ending dual labelling had been abolished.

There are still a few cases where imperial units are required to be used and where metric units are not permitted within the scope of the Weights and Measures Act, such as the pint for the sale of draught beer and cider, and miles and yards for distances on road signage. Milk in returnable containers may be sold by the pint and the troy ounce may be used for the sale of precious metals. In addition, British law specifies which non-metric units may be used with dual labelling (for example the imperial gallon, but not the US gallon).

== England ==
=== Acts of the Witenagemot ===
Numerous acts of the Saxon kings are known to have been lost. Those that have survived include:

==== 10th century ====
2 Edgar c. 8 (sometime between 959 and 963):

be mynetum and ᵹemetum.

And gange án mẏnet ofer ealne þæs cẏniges anƿeald⋅ ⁊ þone nan man ne forsace⋅ ⁊ gange án gemet ⁊ án geƿihte⋅ sƿilce man on Lunden-bẏrig ⁊ on Ƿintan-ceastre healde⋅ ⁊ ga seo ƿæge ƿulle to ⋅cxx⋅ p̃. ⁊ nan man hig undeoror ne sẏlle⋅ ⁊ gif hƿa hi þonne undeoror sẏlle⋅ oþþe eaƿunga oþþe dearnunga⋅ gilde ægðer þam cẏnge ⋅xl⋅ scillingá. ge seþe hi sẏlle ge seþe hi bẏcge:⋅

Translation:

of money and measures.

And let one money pass throughout the king's dominion; and that let no man refuse: and let one measure and one weight pass; such as is observed at London and at Winchester; and let the wey of wool go for 120 pence; and let no man sell it cheaper; and if any one sell it cheaper, either publicly or privately, let each pay 40 shillings to the king, both him who sells it, and him who buys it.

The statute also survives in a few other Old English and Latin copies, some which omit mention of London and describe "the measure held at Winchester", an indication that a standard ell or yard was nominally in use:

de moneta, et mensura, et pondere.

Et sit una moneta per totum regis imperium, et nemo sonet eam; et mensura, sicut apud Wincestriam habetur. Et eat pondus lane pro dimidia libra, et nemo carius vendat eam.

Translation:

on money, and measure, and weight.

And let there be one money through all the king's dominion; and let no man refuse it; and [one] measure, as is held at Winchester. And let the weight of wool go for a half-pound, and no one sell it more dearly.

John Quincy Adams's 1821 report on the history of English weights and measures notes of this act that "it was never observed".

=== Acts of the Royal Council ===
==== 11th century ====
3 William I c. 7 (1068):

De mensuris et ponderibus

Et quod habeant per universum regnum mensuras fidelissimas, & signatas, & pondera fidelissima & signata, sicut boni Praedecessores statuerunt.

Translation:

On measures and weights

We ordain and command that the weights and measures, throughout our realm, be as our worthy predecessors have established.

==== 12th century ====
9 Richard I c. 27 (1197):

Assize of Measures

It is established that woollen cloths, wherever they be made, be made of the same width, to wit, of two ells within the lists [selvages], and of the same good quality in the middle and at the sides. Also the ell shall be the same in the whole realm and of the same length and the ell shall be of iron.

=== Acts of Parliament ===
==== Statutes of uncertain date ====
The statutes of uncertain date (Latin: Statuta temporis incerti) are generally dated to the mid-to-late 13th century.

Assisa de Ponderibz et Mensuris
- Act of Parliament
- Parliament of England
- Long title: The Assise of Weights and Measures
- Territorial extent: England and Wales; Ireland

Dates
- Royal assent: Unknown
- Commencement: Unknown
- Repealed: England and Wales: 28 July 1863; Ireland: 10 August 1872
Other legislation
Repealed by	England and Wales: Statute Law Revision Act 1863; Ireland: Statute Law (Ireland) Revision Act 1872

Status: Repealed

Text of statute as originally enacted

The Assize of Bread and Ale (Assisa Panis et Cervisiae)
Sometimes dated to 51 Henry III (1267–68). Statute I - Section III:

By the Consent of the whole Realm of England, the measure of our Lord the King was made; that is to say, That the English Peny, called a Sterling, round and without clipping, shall weigh xxxii Wheat Corns in the midst of the Ear, and xx d. do make an Ounce, and xii Ounces one Pound, and Viii Pound do make a Gallon of Wine, and viii Gallons of Wine do make a London Bushel, which is the Eighth Part of a Quarter. Forasmuch as in our Parliament holden at Westminster, in the first Year of our Reign, we have granted that all good Statutes and Ordinances made in Times of our Progenitors aforesaid, and not revoked, shall be still held, we have caused, at the Request of the Bakers of our Town of Coventry, that the Ordinances aforesaid, by tenor of these Presents, shall be exemplified. In Witness whereof, &c. Whitness the King at Westminster, the xxii Day of March.

Statutum de Pistoribus, et cetera (The Statute concerning Bakers, et cetera)
Tractatus de Ponderibus et Mensuris
Also known as the Tractatus de Ponderibus, Compositio de Ponderibus ("The Composition of Weights"), Assisa de Ponderibus et Mensuris ("Assize of Weights and Measures") or the Weights and Measures Act 1303. In the Latin and English text, "hundred" (and the Latin numeral c.) is used for four separate concepts: the Germanic long hundred of 120, the short hundred of 100, several units of either value, and a separate unit (the hundredweight) of 108 pounds.
The form in which it appears in Cotton MS Claudius D2 where it is dated to 31 Edw. I (1303) is:

Tractatus de Ponderibus et Mensuris.

Per Ordinacionem tocius regni Anglie fuit mensura Domini Regis composita videlicet quod denarius qui vocatur sterlingus rotundus & sine tonsura ponderabit triginta duo grana frumenti in medio Spice.

Et uncia ponderabit viginti denarios. Et duodecim uncie faciunt libram London. Et duodecim libre & dimid’ faciunt petram London. Et octo libre frumenti faciunt galonem. Libra continet viginti solidos. Et octo galones faciunt bussellum London. Saccus lane debet ponderare viginti & octo petras & solebat ponderare unam summam frumenti & ponderat sextam partem unius carri de plumbo. sexies viginti petre faciunt carrum plumbi scilicet magnum carrum London’ set carrus del Peek est multo minus.

Item carrus plumbi constat ex triginta fotmallis & quodlibet fotmal continet sex petras duabus libris minus. Et quelibet petra habet duodecim libras & quelibet libra constat ex viginti quinque solidis in pondere. summa librarum in le fotmal lxx. summa petrarum in le Carre viii. xx. & xv. petre & probetur per sexies triginta que sunt novies viginti set in quolibet fotmal subtrahuntur due libre a predicta multiplicacione qe sunt lx. libre constituentes quinque petras. Ita sunt in le Carre viii. xx. xv. petre. secundum vero quosdam alios le Carre consistit ex xii. Weyes & hoc secundum troni ponderacionem. Weya enim tam plumbi quam lane lini sepi casei ponderabunt xiiii. petras.

Et duo Weye lane faciunt saccum. Et xii. sacci faciunt le last. Last vero allecis continet decem miliaria. Et quodlibet miliare continet x.c. Et quodlibet c. continet vi. xx.

Item last coriorum constat ex viginti dacris & quodlibet dacre constat ex decem coriis.

Item dacre Cirotecarum constat ex decem paribus dacre vero ferrorum equorum constat ex viginti ferris.

Item duodena cirotecarum pergameni & alute continet in suo genere xii. pelles vel xii. paria cirotecarum.

Item centena cere zucarii piperis cumini amigdalarum & alome continet xiii. petras & dimid’ & quelibet petra continet viii. li. summa librarum in centena cviii. libre. Et constat centem ex v. xx. Et quelibet libra ex viginti quinque solidis. Et sciend’ quod quelibet libra de denariis & speciebus utpote in electuariis consistit solummodo ex pondere xx. s. Libra vero omnium aliarum rerum consistit ex viginti quinque solidis. Uncia vero in electuariis consistit ex viginti denariis. Et libra continet xii. uncias. In aliis vero rebus libra continet quindecim uncias. uncia est hinc inde in pondere viginti denariorum. Centena lini & Canabi & linee tele consistit ex cent’ ulnis. Et quelibet Centena consistit ex vi. xx. Centena vero ferri & solidorum constat ex v. xx. Garba asseris constat ex triginta peciis. Duodena ferri ex sex peciis Item seem vitri constat ex xxiiii. petris & quelibet petra constat ex quinque libris. Et ita continet le seem vi. xx. libras.

Item binda anguillarum constat ex decem stiks. Et quelibet stik ex viginti quinque anguillis Binda pellium continet xxxii. timbr’ senellio cuniculorum & grisi continet quadraginta pelles. Cheef de fustiano constat ex tresdecim ulnis Caput sindonis ex decem ulnis Le rees allecium continet quindecim glenes. Et quodlibet glene continet viginti quinque capita. Item centene Mulvellorum & durorum piscium constat ex viii. xx.

Translation:

Treatise on Weights and Measures.

Per Ordinance of the whole realm of England the measure of the King is composed namely of a penny, which is called a sterling, round & without clipping, weighs thirty-two grains of wheat in the middle of the Ear.

And an ounce weighs twenty pence. And twelve ounces make a pound of London. And twelve & a half pounds make a stone of London. And eight pounds of wheat make a gallon. Pound contains twenty shillings. And eight gallons make a bushel of London.
Sacks of wool should weigh twenty-eight stones and usually weighs of wheat and weighs a sixth part of a load of lead. Six times twenty stone, make a load of lead, to wit the great load of London, but the load of the Peak is much less.

Also loads of lead consist of thirty fotmals, and each fotmal contains six stones minus two pounds. And each stone consists of twelve pounds, and each pound consists of twenty-five shillings in weight. The sum of the pounds in the fotmal is 70. The sum of the stones in the Load is 175 stones and is proved by six times thirty which is nine score (180) except for each fotmal subract two pounds multiplied as before (x30) which is 60 pounds constituting five stones. So there are in the load 175 stones. But according to some others the load consists of 12 Weys and this is according to troni weight, Wey for both lead and wool linen tallow cheese weighs 14 stones.

And two Weys of wool make a sack, And 12 sacks make a last. But a last of herrings contains 10 thousand, and each Thousand contains 10 hundred, and each hundred contains 120.

A last of leather consists of twenty dicker, and each dicker consists of ten skins.

Also a dicker of gloves consists of ten pairs, but a dicker of horse-shoes consists of twenty shoes.

Also a dozen of gloves, parchment, and vellum contains in its kind 12 skins, or 12 pairs of gloves.

Also a hundred of wax, sugar, pepper, cumin, almonds & alum, contains 13 stones & a half & each stone contains 8 pounds for a total of 108 pounds in the hundred. And appears as hundred of 100. And each pound of twenty-five shillings. And is to be known that each pound of money & species as in electuaries consists only of pounds of 20 shillings. But pounds for all other things consist of twenty five shillings. An Ounce in electuaries consists of twenty pence and pound contains 12 ounces. But in other things the pounds contains fifteen ounces, the ounce in either case weighs twenty pence. Also hundred of Canvass, and linen cloth consists of one hundred Ells and each hundred consists of 120. But the hundred of iron and shillings consists of 100. The sheaf of [steel] consists of thirty pieces. The Dozen of iron consists of six pieces. The seam of glass consists of 24 stones, and each stone consists of five pounds. And so contains the seam 120 pounds.

Also a bind of eels consists of ten sticks. And each stick of twenty-five eels. A bind of pelts consists of 32 timber of rabbits and squirrels contains forty pelts. A Chef of Fustian consists of thirteen Ells. A Chef of Sindon contains ten Ells. A Hundred of [Garlike] consisteth of fifteen Ropes, and every Rope containeth fifteen Heads. Also a Hundred of Mulvells and Hard Fish consists of 160.

Magna Carta
Although signed in 1215, Magna Carta was not ratified by Parliament until 1225, by which time it had become substantially abridged. Chapter 35 of Magna Carta of 1215 (which dealt with weights and measures) became chapter 25 of Magna Carta of 1225.

==== 14th century ====
14 Edw. 3 Stat. 1. c. 12 (1340)

Bushels and Weights shall be made and sent into every Country.

18 Edw. 3 Stat. 2. c. 4 (1344)

Commissions to assay Weights and Measures shall be repealed, and none such granted.

25 Edw. 3 Stat. 5. c. 9 (1350)

Enfement pur ce qe tres grant damage & desceit est fait au people par tant qe plusours marchantz usent dachater & poiser leines & autres marchandises par une pois qest appelle Aunsell’ Acorde est & establi qe celle pois appelle Aunsell’ entre achatour et vendour soit del tout ofte & qe chescun vend & achat par balances iffint qe les balances soient owels & les leines & autres marchandises owelment poisez par droit pois & qe le sak de leine ne poise qe vint & sys peres & chescun pere poise quatorze livres & qe lestater de la balance ne encline ne a lune partie ne al autre & qe le pois soit acordant al estandard del Escheker. Et si nul achatour face al encontre soit grevousement puny sibien a la seute de partie come a la seute nostre Seignur le Roi.

Translation:

Auncel Weight shall be put out, and Weighing shall be by equal Balance.

Item, Whereas great Damage and Deceit is done to the People, for that divers Merchants use to buy and weigh Woolls and other Merchandises, by a Weight which is called Auncel; it is accorded and established, That this Weight called Auncel betwixt Buyers and Sellers, shall be wholly put out; (2) and that every Person do sell and buy by the Balance, so that the Balance be even, and the Woolls and other Merchandizes evenly weighed by the right Weight, so that the Sack of Wooll weigh no more but 26 Stones, and every Stone to weigh 14 l. and that the Beam of the Balance do not bow more to the one Part than to the other; (3) and that the Weight be according to the Standard of the Exchequer. (4) And if any Buyer do the contrary, he shall be grievously punished, as well at the Suit of the Party, as at the Suit of our Lord the King.

25 Edw. 3 Stat. 5. c. 10 (1350)

Auxint come contenue soit en la Grande Chartre qe une mesure soit usee parmy tout Engleterre la quele chartre nad mie este tenu bien en ceo point avant ses heures si est acorde & assentu qe touz les mesures cest asavoir bussel dimid' bussel & peck galon potel & quart par toute Engleterre deinz fanchise & dehors soient acordauntz al estandard nostre Seignur le Roi & contiegne le quartre oet busselx par lestandard & nient pluis. Et soit chescune mesure de blee rase fanz comble sauvez les rentes & fermes des Seignurs queles soient avant ces heures. Et facent les purveours le Roi ma dame la Roigne & touz autres lours purveances par meismes les mesures rases & en meisme le manere Et a toutes les foitz qe mestier serra Nostre Seignur le Roi assignera certeines Justices en chescune countee denqueer & doier & terminer sur les pointz suisditz & de faire sur ce due punissement solone chescun trespas siebien a la seute de partie come a la seute le Roi. Iffint totes soitz qe toutes maneres des franchises soient sauvez as Seignurs en toutz pointz saunz nul emblemissement ent faire en quecumqe manere.

Translation:

Every Measure shall be according to the King's Standard; and shall be striked without Heap; saving the Rents of Lords.

Item, Whereas it is contained in the Great Charter, that one Measure shall be throughout England, which Charter hath not been well kept and holden in this Point in Times past; (2) it is accorded and assented, That all the Measures, that is to say, Bushels, Half-bushels, Peck, Gallon, Pottle, and Quart, throughout England, within the Franchises and without, shall be according to the King's Standard; (3) and the Quarter shall contain Eight Bushels by the Standard, and no more. (4) And every Measure of Corn shall be striken without Heap, saving the Rents and Ferms of Lords, which shall be measured by such Measures as they were wont in Times past. (5) And the Purveyors of the King, of the Queen, and all other, shall make their Purveyances by the same Measure striked in the same Manner, and at all Times that shall be needful. (6) And our Lord the King shall assign certain Justices in every County to inquire, hear, and determine upon the Points aforesaid, and upon the same to do Punishment according to the Trespass, as well at the Party's Suit, as at the King's; (7) so always, that all Manner of Franchises be saved to the Lords in all Points without Blemish to be made in any Manner.

27 Edw. 3 Stat. 2. c. 10 (1353)

... un pois, un mesure, et un verge soit per tut la terre ...

Translation:

There shall be but one Weight, Measure and Yard throughout the Realm.

... one weight, one measure [of volume], and one [measuring] stick shall there be through all the land...

A chapter of the Statute of the Staple that provides for justices to be appointed to hear charges of measuring fraud at the staple ports. Those found guilty were liable for quadruple damages and 2 years' imprisonment.
31 Edw. 3 Stat. 1. c. 2 (1357)

No Wool shall be bought by Fraud to abate the Price thereof. Weights shall be sent to all the Shires.

4 Ric. 2. c. 1 (1380)

All Vessels of Wine, Honey, and Oil brought into this realm shall be gauged.

13 Ric. 2. Stat. 1. c. 9 (1389)

There shall be but one Weight and one Measure throughout the Realm, saving in the County of Lancaster. The Weight of Wool, and the Refuse thereof.

15 Ric. 2. c. 4. (1391)

There shall be but eight Bushels of Corn striked to the Quarter.

16 Ric. 2. c. 3. (1392)

The Clerk of the Market shall carry with him all his Weights and Measures signed.

==== 15th century ====
Corn Measure Act 1413
- Act of Parliament
- Parliament of England
- Long title: An Act concerning the true Measure of Corn.
- Citation: 1 Hen. 5. c. 10
- Territorial extent: England and Wales; Ireland

Dates
- Royal assent: 9 June 1413
- Commencement: 14 May 1413 (Note: Start of session.)
- Repealed: England and Wales: 28 July 1863; Ireland: 10 August 1872
Other legislation
Amended by	Weights and Measures Act 1824
Repealed by	England and Wales: Statute Law Revision Act 1863; Ireland: Statute Law (Ireland) Revision Act 1872

Status: Repealed

Text of statute as originally enacted

1 Hen. 5. c. 10 (1413),

An Act concerning the true Measure of Corn.

Gilding of Silver Act 1414
- Act of Parliament
- Parliament of England
- Long title: There Shall be no gilding of Silver Ware but of the Allay of English Sterling.
- Citation: 2 Hen. 5. Stat. 2. c. 4
- Territorial extent: England and Wales; Ireland

Dates
- Royal assent: 1414
- Commencement: 19 November 1414
- Repealed: 21 July 1856
Other legislation
Amended by	Continuance, etc. of Laws Act 1623
Repealed by	Repeal of Obsolete Statutes Act 1856

Status: Repealed

Text of statute as originally enacted

2 Hen. 5. Stat. 2. c. 4 (1414)

There Shall be no gilding of Silver Ware but of the Allay of English Sterling.

First notice of troy weight in statute.

Weights, etc. Act 1429
- Act of Parliament
- Parliament of England
- Long title: Every City and Borough shall have a common Balance and Weight. Who may buy Wool and Yarn.
- Citation: 8 Hen. 6. c. 5
- Territorial extent: England and Wales; Ireland

Dates
- Royal assent: 1429
- Commencement: 22 September 1429
- Repealed: England and Wales: 28 July 1863; Ireland: 10 August 1872
Other legislation
Amended by	Continuance, etc. of Laws Act 1623; Weights and Measures Act 1824
Repealed by	England and Wales: Statute Law Revision Act 1863; Ireland: Statute Law (Ireland) Revision Act 1872

Status: Repealed

Text of statute as originally enacted

8 Hen. 6. c. 5 (1429)

Every City and Borough shall have a common Balance and Weight. Who may buy Wool and Yarn.

Cloth Measures Act 1439
- Act of Parliament
- Parliament of England
- Long title: There shall be but one Measure of Cloth through the Realm by the Yard and the Inch, and not by the Yard and Handful, according to the London Measure.
- Citation: 18 Hen. 6. c. 16
- Territorial extent: England and Wales; Ireland

Dates
- Royal assent: 1439
- Commencement: 12 November 1439
- Repealed: England and Wales: 28 July 1863; Ireland: 10 August 1872
Other legislation
Repealed by	England and Wales: Statute Law Revision Act 1863; Ireland: Statute Law (Ireland) Revision Act 1872
Relates to	Vessels of Wine, etc. Act 1439

Status: Repealed

Text of statute as originally enacted

18 Hen. 6. c. 16 (1439)

Item – come il foit meritorie & almoigne a departer la veritee de la desciet si come jatarde en un parlement tenuz a Westm' la fuist ouste un rayme...

Translation:

There shall be but one Measure of Cloth through the Realm by the Yard and the Inch, and not by the Yard and Handful, according to the London Measure.

Vessels of Wine, etc. Act 1439
- Act of Parliament
- Parliament of England
- Long title: Vessels of Wine, Oyl, and Honey, shall be gauged.
- Citation: 18 Hen. 6. c. 17
- Territorial extent: England and Wales; Ireland

Dates
- Royal assent: 1439
- Commencement: 12 November 1439
- Repealed: 1 January 1826
Other legislation
Amended by	Repeal of Acts Concerning Importation Act 1822
Repealed by	Weights and Measures Act 1824
Relates to	Cloth Measures Act 1439

Status: Repealed

Text of statute as originally enacted

18 Hen. 6. c. 17 (1439)

Vessels of Wine, Oyl, and Honey, shall be gauged.

Item – pur ceo qe toutz les tonels pipes tertians & hoggeshedes de vin oyle & mele ...

Translation:

Item – Because all the Tuns, Pipes, Tertians and Hogsheads of Wine, Oyl, and Honey...

Weights and Measures Act 1495
- Act of Parliament
- Parliament of England
- Long title: An Act for Weights and Measures.
- Citation: 11 Hen. 7. c. 4
- Territorial extent: England and Wales

Dates
- Royal assent: 22 December 1495
- Commencement: 14 October 1495
- Repealed: England and Wales: 28 July 1863; Ireland: 10 August 1872
Other legislation
Amended by	Weights and Measures Act 1824
Repealed by	England and Wales: Statute Law Revision Act 1863; Ireland: Statute Law (Ireland) Revision Act 1872
Relates to	Weights, etc. Act 1429; Weights and Measures Act 1433; Weights and Measures Act 1496

Status: Repealed

Text of statute as originally enacted

11 Hen. 7. c. 4 (1494)

An Act for Weights and Measures.

The Names of the Cities and Towns limited for the keeping of Weights and Measures.

Weights and Measures Act 1496
- Act of Parliament
- Parliament of England
- Long title: An Act for Weights and Measures.
- Citation: 12 Hen. 7. c. 5
- Territorial extent: England and Wales

Dates
- Royal assent: 13 March 1497
- Commencement: 16 January 1497
- Repealed: 28 July 1863
Other legislation
Amended by	Weights and Measures Act 1824
Repealed by	Statute Law Revision Act 1863
Relates to	Weights and Measures Act 1495

Status: Repealed

Text of statute as originally enacted

12 Hen. 7. c. 5 (1496)

An Act for Weights and Measures.

That the Measure of a Bushel contain viij. Gallons of Wheat, and that every Gallon contain viij. li. of Wheat of Troy Weight, and every Pound contain xij. Ounces of Troy Weight, and every Ounce contain xx. Sterlings, and every Sterling be of the Weight of xxxij. Corns of Wheat that grew in the Midst of the Ear of Wheat, according to the old Laws of this Land.

==== 16th century ====
Verdict of the Pyx 18 Henry VIII (1527)

And whereas heretofore the merchaunte paid for coynage of every pounde Towre of fyne gold weighing xi oz. quarter Troye ii s. vi d. Nowe it is determyned by the king's highness, and his said councelle that the foresaid pounde Towre shall be no more used and occupied but al maner of golde and sylver shall be wayed by the pounde Troye, which maketh xii oz. Troy, which exceedith the pounde Towre in weight iii quarters of the oz.

Brewers and Coopers Act 1531
- Act of Parliament
- Parliament of England
- Long title: An Act that no Brewers of Beer or Ale shall make their Barrels, Kilderkins nor Firkins, within them; and how much the same Barrels, &c. shall contain.
- Citation: 23 Hen. 8. c. 4
- Territorial extent: England and Wales

Dates
- Royal assent: 14 May 1532
- Commencement: 15 January 1532
- Repealed: 28 July 1863
Other legislation
Repealed by	Statute Law Revision Act 1863
Relates to	Assize of Bread and Ale

Status: Repealed

Text of statute as originally enacted

23 Hen. 8. c. 4 (1531)

An Act that no Brewers of Beer or Ale shall make their Barrels, Kilderkins or Firkins within them, and how much the same Barrels, et cetera shall contain.

Sale of Flesh Act 1532
- Act of Parliament
- Parliament of England
- Long title: An Act for Flesh to be sold by Weight.
- Citation: 24 Hen. 8. c. 3
- Territorial extent: England and Wales

Dates
- Royal assent: 7 April 1533
- Commencement: 1 August 1533 (Note: Section 1.)
- Repealed: 1 August 1542
Other legislation
Repealed by	Butchers Act 1541
Relates to	Flax and Hemp Act 1532

Status: Repealed

Text of statute as originally enacted

24 Hen. 8. c. 3 (1532)

An Act for flesh to be sold by weight, and the prices limited.

Beef, pork, mutton and veal shall be sold by weight called Haver-de-pois.

Flax and Hemp Act 1532
- Act of Parliament
- Parliament of England
- Long title: An Act concerning sowing of Flax and Hemp.
- Citation: 24 Hen. 8. c. 4
- Territorial extent: England and Wales

Dates
- Royal assent: 7 April 1533
- Commencement: 29 September 1533 (Note: Section 1. The Feast of St. Michael.)
- Repealed: 28 July 1863
Other legislation
Amended by	Continuance of Laws (No. 3) Act 1536; Continuation of Laws Act 1541; Continuance of Laws Act 1545; Continuance of Acts Act 1553
Repealed by	Statute Law Revision Act 1863
Relates to	Sale of Flesh Act 1532

Status: Repealed

Text of statute as originally enacted

24 Hen. 8. c. 4 (1532)

An Act concerning sowing of Flax and Hemp.

An acre shall be counted 160 perches, and every perch 16-foot and a half.

Woollen Cloth Act 1551
- Act of Parliament
- Parliament of England
- Long title: An Act for the true making of Woolen Cloth.
- Citation: 5 & 6 Edw. 6. c. 6
- Territorial extent: England and Wales

Dates
- Royal assent: 15 April 1552
- Commencement: 23 January 1552
- Repealed: 21 July 1856
Other legislation
Amended by	Continuance, etc. of Laws Act 1623; Woollen Manufacture Act 1809
Repealed by	Repeal of Obsolete Statutes Act 1856
Relates to	Woollen Cloths Act 1557

Status: Repealed

Text of statute as originally enacted

5 & 6 Edw. 6. c. 6 (1552)

An Act for the true making of Woolen Cloth.

XIV. And that all and every Broad Cloth and Clothes called Taunton Clothes, Bridgwaters, and other Clothes which shall be made after the said Feast in Taunton, Bridgwater or in other Places of like Sort, shall contain at the Water in Length betwixt twelve and thirteen Yards, Yard and Inch of the Rule, and in Breadth seven Quarters of a Yard: (2) And every narrow Cloth made after the said Feast in the said Towns or elsewhere of like Sorts, shall contain in the Water in Length betwixt three and twenty and five and twenty Yards, Yard and Inch as is aforesaid, and in Breadth one Yard of like Measure; (3) and every such Cloth, both Broad and Narrow being well scowred, thicked, milled and fully dried, shall weigh xxxiv. li. the Piece at the least.

XV. And that all Clothes named Check-Kersie and Straits, which shall be made after the said Feast shall contain being wet between seventeen and eighteen Yards, with the Inches as is aforesaid, and in Breadth one Yard at the least at the Water; and being well scowred, thicked, milled and fully dried, shall weigh xxiv. li. the Piece at the least.

Woollen Cloths Act 1557
- Act of Parliament
- Parliament of England
- Long title: An Act towching the making of Wollen Clothes.
- Citation: 4 & 5 Ph. & M. c. 5
- Territorial extent: England and Wales

Dates
- Royal assent: 7 March 1558
- Commencement: 20 January 1558
- Repealed: 28 June 1815
Other legislation
Amended by	Continuance, etc. of Laws Act 1623; Woollen Manufacture Act 1809
Repealed by	City of London Courts of Justice Act 1815
Relates to	Woollen Cloth Act 1551

Status: Repealed

Text of statute as originally enacted

4 & 5 Ph. & M. c. 5. par. IX (1557–58)

An act touching the making of woolen clothes.

IX. Item, That every ordinary kersie mentioned in the said act shall contain in length in the water betwixt xvi. and xvii. yards, yard and inch; and being well scoured thicked, milled, dressed and fully dried, shall weigh nineteen pounds the piece at the least: ...

Wax Act 1580
- Act of Parliament
- Parliament of England
- Long title: An Act touching the true melting, making and working of Wax.
- Citation: 23 Eliz. 1. c. 8
- Territorial extent: England and Wales

Dates
- Royal assent: 18 March 1581
- Commencement: 14 May 1581 (Note: Section 1. The Feast of Pentecost.)
- Repealed: 21 July 1856
Other legislation
Amended by	Weights and Measures Act 1824
Repealed by	Repeal of Obsolete Statutes Act 1856

Status: Repealed

Text of statute as originally enacted

23 Eliz. 1. c. 8 (1581)

An Act touching the true melting, making and working of Wax.

... fill and sell or cause to be filled or sold or offered to be sold any Barrel, Kilderkin or Firkin with Honey, for or in the Name of a Barrel, Kilderkin or Firkin containing less than two and thirty Wine Gallons the Barrel, sixteen Wine Gallons the Kilderkin, and eight Wine Gallons the Firkin; every Person and Persons so offending shall forfeit and lose for every Half Gallon so lacking five Shillings of English Money.

Restriction on Building Act 1592
- Act of Parliament
- Parliament of England
- Long title: An Act against converting of great Houses into several Tenements, and for Restraint of Inmates and Inclosures, in and near about the City of London and Westminster.
- Citation: 35 Eliz. 1. c. 6
- Territorial extent: England and Wales

Dates
- Royal assent: 10 April 1593
- Commencement: 18 February 1593
- Repealed: 27 March 1888
Other legislation
Repealed by	Statute Law Revision Act 1888

Status: Repealed

Text of statute as originally enacted

35 Eliz. 1. c. 6 (1593)

An Act against converting of great Houses into several Tenements, and for Restraint of Inmates and Inclosures, in and near about the City of London and Westminster.

A Mile shall contain eight Furlongs, every Furlong forty Poles, and every Pole shall contain sixteen Foot and an half.

This is the codification and namesake of the statute mile.

Cloth Act 1592
- Act of Parliament
- Parliament of England
- Long title: An act for the reformation of sundry abuses in clothes, called Devonshire kersies or dozens, according to a proclamation of the thirty-fourth year of the reign of our sovereign lady the Queen that now is.
- Citation: 35 Eliz. 1. c. 10
- Territorial extent: England and Wales

Dates
- Royal assent: 10 April 1593
- Commencement: 1 July 1593
- Repealed: 15 June 1809
Other legislation
Amended by	Continuance, etc. of Laws Act 1601; Continuance, etc. of Laws Act 1623; Continuance of Laws, etc. Act 1627
Repealed by	Woollen Manufacture Act 1809

Status: Repealed

Text of statute as originally enacted

35 Eliz. 1. c. 10. par. III (1593)

An act for the reformation of sundry abuses in clothes, called Devonshire kersies or dozens, according to a proclamation of the thirty-fourth year of the reign of our sovereign lady the Queen that now is.

(2) and each and every of the same Devonshire kersies or dozens, so being raw, and as it cometh forth off the weaver's loom (without racking, stretching, straining or other device to encrease the length thereof) shall contain in length between fifteen and sixteen yards by the measure of yard and inch by the rule, ...

==== 17th century ====
Clerk of the Market Act 1640
- Act of Parliament
- Parliament of England
- Long title: An Act for the better ordering and regulating of the Office of Clerk of the Market, allowed and confirmed by this Statutes; and for the Reformation of false Weights and Measures.
- Citation: 16 Cha. 1. c. 19
- Territorial extent: England and Wales

Dates
- Royal assent: 10 August 1641
- Commencement: 3 November 1640
- Repealed: 28 July 1863
Other legislation
Amended by	Measures Act 1670; Weights and Measures Act 1824
Repealed by	Statute Law Revision Act 1863

Status: Repealed

Text of statute as originally enacted

16 Cha. 1. c. 19 (1640)

An Act for the better ordering and regulating of the Office of Clerk of the Market, allowed and confirmed by this Statutes; and for the Reformation of false Weights and Measures.

Measures Act 1670
- Act of Parliament
- Parliament of England
- Long title: An Act for ascertaining the Measures of Corne and Salt.
- Citation: 22 Cha. 2. c. 8
- Territorial extent: England and Wales

Dates
- Royal assent: 11 April 1670
- Commencement: 29 September 1670
- Repealed: 28 July 1863
Other legislation
Amends	Clerk of the Market Act 1640
Amended by	Weights and Measures Act 1824
Repealed by	Statute Law Revision Act 1863

Status: Repealed

Text of statute as originally enacted

22 Cha. 2 c. 8 (1670)

An Act for ascertaining the Measures of Corn and Salt.
First mention of the Winchester bushel in statute.

Measures (No. 2) Act 1670
- Act of Parliament
- Parliament of England
- Long title: An additional Act for ascertaining the Measures of Corn and Salt.
- Citation: 22 & 23 Cha. 2. c. 12
- Territorial extent: England and Wales

Dates
- Royal assent: 22 April 1671
- Commencement: 25 March 1672
- Repealed: 28 July 1863
Other legislation
Amended by	Weights and Measures Act 1824
Repealed by	Statute Law Revision Act 1863

Status: Repealed

Text of statute as originally enacted

22 & 23 Cha. 2. c. 12 (1670)

An additional Act for ascertaining the Measures of Corn and Salt.
8 & 9 Will. 3 c. 22. s. 9 (1696–7)

... every round bushel with a plain and even bottom being eighteen inches and a half wide throughout and eight inches deep shall be determined a legal Winchester bushel according to the Standard of His Majesty's Exchequer.

First definition of the Winchester bushel in statute (≈2,150.42 cubic inches).

==== 18th century ====
Ale Measures Act 1698
- Act of Parliament
- Parliament of England
- Long title: An Act for the ascertaining the Measures for retailing Ale and Beer.
- Citation: 11 Will. 3. c. 15 (Note: This is the citation in The Statutes of the Realm.); 11 & 12 Will. 3. c. 15 (Note: This is the citation in The Statutes at Large.)
- Territorial extent: England and Wales

Dates
- Royal assent: 11 April 1700
- Commencement: 24 June 1700
- Repealed: 15 July 1867
Other legislation
Amended by	Weights and Measures Act 1824
Repealed by	Statute Law Revision Act 1867

Status: Repealed

Text of statute as originally enacted

11 Will. 3. c. 15 (1700)

An Act for ascertaining the Measures for retailing Ale and Beer.

Water Measure of Fruit Act 1702
- Act of Parliament
- Parliament of England
- Long title: An Act to ascertain the water measure of fruit.
- Citation: 1 Ann. c. 9; 1 Ann. St. 1. c. 15
- Territorial extent: England and Wales

Dates
- Royal assent: 6 May 1702
- Commencement: 8 March 1702
- Repealed: 1 January 1826
Other legislation
Repealed by	Weights and Measures Act 1824

Status: Repealed

Text of statute as originally enacted

1 Ann. c. 9 (1701)

An Act to ascertain the Water Measure of Fruit.

== Great Britain ==
=== Acts of Parliament ===
==== 18th century ====
Taxation (No. 5) Act 1706
- Act of Parliament
- Parliament of England
- Long title: An Act for continuing several Subsidies, Impositions and Duties and for making Provisions therein mentioned to raise Money by Way of Loan for the Service of the War, and other Her Majesty's necessary and important Occasions, and for ascertaining the Wine Measure.
- Citation: 6 Ann. c. 27; 5 Ann. c. 27
- Territorial extent: England and Wales

Dates
- Royal assent: 8 April 1707
- Commencement: 3 December 1706
- Repealed: 15 July 1867
Other legislation
Amends	Subsidy Act 1660; Customs Act 1660; Customs Act 1662; Aliens Duty Act 1672; Trade Act 1672; Taxation (Wine and Vinegar) Act 1685; Taxation (Tobacco and Sugar) Act 1685; Tillage Act 1685; Taxation (No. 3) Act 1690; Taxation Act 1692; Duty on Tin Act 1696; Lustrings Act 1697; Taxation (Whale Fins and Scotch Linen) Act 1697; Taxation (No. 3) Act 1698; Taxation, etc. Act 1702
Repealed by	Statute Law Revision Act 1867
Relates to	Taxation (No. 2) Act 1695

Status: Repealed

Text of statute as originally enacted

Taxation (No. 5) Act 1706 (6 Ann. c. 27)

An Act for continuing several Subsidies, Impositions and Duties and for making Provisions therein mentioned to raise Money by Way of Loan for the Service of the War, and other Her Majesty's necessary and important Occasions, and for ascertaining the Wine Measure.

... any Vessel containing two hundred thirty one cubical Inches and no more shall be deemed and taken to be a lawful Wine Gallon ...

This statute is the origin of the US gallon, also known as the Queen Anne Gallon, Queen Anne Wine Gallon, or pre-1824 British gallon.

False Weights and Scales Act 1770
- Act of Parliament
- Parliament of Great Britain
- Long title: An Act for more effectually preventing Traders in exciseable Commodities from using false Weights and Scales and for explaining and amending several Acts of Parliament relating to Hackney Coaches and Chairs.
- Citation: 10 Geo. 3. c. 44
- Territorial extent: Great Britain

Dates
- Royal assent: 19 May 1770
- Commencement: 24 June 1770 (Note: Section 1.)
- Repealed: 26 August 1889
Other legislation
Amends	Stamps (No. 2) Act 1766
Amended by	London Hackney Carriage Act 1831; Statute Law Revision Act 1867; Statute Law Revision Act 1887; Statute Law Revision Act 1888
Repealed by	Revenue Act 1889

Status: Repealed

Text of statute as originally enacted

False Weights and Scales Act 1770 (10 Geo. 3. c. 44)

An Act for more effectually preventing Traders in exciseable Commodities from using false Weights and Scales and for explaining and amending several Acts of Parliament relating to Hackney Coaches and Chairs.

Weights and Measures Act 1795
- Act of Parliament
- Parliament of Great Britain
- Long title: An Act for the more effectual Prevention of the Use of defective Weights, and of false and unequal Balances.
- Citation: 35 Geo. 3. c. 102
- Territorial extent: Great Britain

Dates
- Royal assent: 22 June 1795
- Commencement: 22 June 1795
- Repealed: 1 January 1879
Other legislation
Amended by	Weights and Measures Act 1797; Statute Law Revision Act 1871
Repealed by	Weights and Measures Act 1878

Status: Repealed

Text of statute as originally enacted

Weights and Measures Act 1795 (35 Geo. 3. c. 102)

An Act for the more effectual Prevention of the Use of defective Weights, and of false and unequal Balances.

Weights and Measures Act 1797
- Act of Parliament
- Parliament of Great Britain
- Long title: An Act to explain and amend an Act made in the thirty-fifth Year of the Reign of his present Majesty, intituled, "An Act for the more effectual Prevention of the use of defective Weights, and of false and unequal Balances."
- Citation: 37 Geo. 3. c. 143
- Territorial extent: Great Britain

Dates
- Royal assent: 20 July 1797
- Commencement: 10 July 1797
- Repealed: 1 January 1879
Other legislation
Amends	Weights and Measures Act 1795
Amended by	Statute Law Revision Act 1871
Repealed by	Weights and Measures Act 1878

Status: Repealed

Text of statute as originally enacted

Weights and Measures Act 1797 (37 Geo. 3. c. 143)

An Act to explain and amend an Act made in the thirty-fifth Year of the Reign of his present Majesty, intituled, An Act for the more effectual Prevention of the use of defective Weights, and of false and unequal Balances.

==== 19th century ====
Weights and Measures Act 1815
- Act of Parliament
- Parliament of the United Kingdom
- Long title: An Act for the more effectual Prevention of the Use of false and deficient Measures.
- Citation: 55 Geo. 3. c. 43
- Territorial extent: United Kingdom

Dates
- Royal assent: 2 May 1815
- Commencement: 2 May 1815
- Repealed: 1 January 1879
Other legislation
Repealed by	Weights and Measures Act 1878

Status: Repealed

Text of statute as originally enacted

Weights and Measures Act 1815 (55 Geo. 3. c. 43)

An Act for the more effectual Prevention of the Use of false and deficient Measures.

Weights and Measures Act 1824
- Act of Parliament
- Parliament of the United Kingdom
- Long title: An Act for ascertaining and establishing Uniformity of Weights and Measures.
- Citation: 5 Geo. 4. c. 74
- Territorial extent: United Kingdom

Dates
- Royal assent: 17 June 1824
- Commencement: 1 January 1826 (Note: The Weights and Measures Act 1825 (6 Geo. 4. c. 12. Section 1 of the act originally provided that the act would come into force on 1 May 1825.)
Other legislation
Repeals/revokes	Navigation Act 1571; Water Measure of Fruit Act 1702
Amended by	Weights and Measures Act 1825; Weights and Measures Act 1834; Weights and Measures Act 1855; Standards of Weights, Measures, and Coinage Act 1866; Weights and Measures Act 1878; Statute Law Revision Act 1873; Statute Law Revision (No. 2) Act 1888; Statute Law Revision Act 1890

Status: Amended

Text of statute as originally enacted

Weights and Measures Act 1824 (5 Geo. 4. c. 74)

An Act for ascertaining and establishing Uniformity of Weights and Measures.

And whereas not withstanding it is provided by the Great Charter, that there shall be but one Measure and one Weight throughout the Realm, and by the Treaty of Union between England and Scotland, that the same Weights and Measures should be used throughout Great Britain as were then established in England, yet different Weights and Measures, some larger, and some less, are still in use in various Places throughout the United Kingdom of Great Britain and Ireland, and the true Measure of the present Standards is not verily known, which is the Cause of great Confusion and of manifest Frauds: For the Remedy and Prevention of these Evils for the future, and to the End that certain Standards of Weights and Measures should be established throughout the United Kingdom of Great Britain and Ireland; be it therefore enacted ...

This is the origin of Imperial units. This statute repeals nearly all previous weights and measures legislation, listing them in chronological order (by regnal year but without dates) beginning with "ancient statutes of uncertain date".
Section 23 of the act repealed 62 enactments, listed in that section, "so far as the same or any of them relate to the ascertaining or establishing any Standards of Weights and Measures or to the establishing or recognizing certain Differences between Weights and Measures of the same Denomination, but no farther or otherwise, shall, from and after the said First Day of May One thousand eight hundred and twenty-five, be and the same are hereby repealed; save and except only so far as any such Statutes or Acts, or any Part thereof, repeal any other Statutes or Acts, or any Part thereof, which relate to the ascertaining or establishing any Standard of Weights and Measures, or to the establishing or recognizing certain Differences between Weights and Measures of the same Denomination."

The commencement of the act, and the repeal of enactments in section 23 of the act, was extended from 1 May 1825 to 1 January 1826 by section 1 of the Weights and Measures Act 1825 (6 Geo. 4. c. 12).

Citation	Short title	Description	Extent of repeal
Stat. Temp. Incert. Assisa Panis et Cervisie	Assisa Panis et Cervisie	Certain ancient Statutes or Ordinances made previous to the Reign of King Edward the Third, but being of uncertain Date, intituled or known by the Names or Descriptions following: "Assisa Panis et Cervisiæ" or " The Assize of Bread and Ale".	The whole act. (Note: The whole act was repealed by the Statute Law Revision Act 1863 (26 & 27 Vict. c. 125). The note to that act states "Repealed (with other enactments) by 5 Geo. 4. c. 74. s. 23. by a description which is sufficient to cover the whole statute; but that repeal is made subject to the qualifying words (applicable to this and the other enactments thereby repealed), so far as the same or any of them relate to the ascertaining or establishing any standards of Weights and Measures, or to the establishing or recognizing certain differences between Weights and Measures of the same denomination, but no further or otherwise.")
Stat. Temp. Incert. Statutum de Pistoribus, etc.	Statutum de Pistoribus, etc.	Certain ancient Statutes or Ordinances made previous to the Reign of King Edward the Third, but being of uncertain Date, intituled or known by the Names or Descriptions following: "Statutum de Pistoribus, et cetera" or "Statute concerning Bakers, et cetera".	The whole act. (Note: The whole act was repealed by the Statute Law Revision Act 1948 (11 & 12 Geo. 6. c. 62).)
Stat. Temp. Incert. Weights and Measures Act 1303	Weights and Measures Act 1303	Certain ancient Statutes or Ordinances made previous to the Reign of King Edward the Third, but being of uncertain Date, intituled or known by the Names or Descriptions following: "Assisa de Ponderibus et Mensuris" or "Tractatus de Ponderibus" or "Compositio de Ponderibus" or "Assize of Weights and Measures".	The whole act. (Note: The whole act was repealed by the Statute Law Revision Act 1863 (26 & 27 Vict. c. 125). The note to that act states "Repealed (with other enactments) by 5 Geo. 4. c. 74. s. 23. in manner stated in last preceding note but one. Obsolete or unnecessary so far as not expressly repealed.")
Stat. Temp. Incert. Statutum de Admensuratione Terre	Statutum de Admensuratione Terre	Certain ancient Statutes or Ordinances made previous to the Reign of King Edward the Third, but being of uncertain Date, intituled or known by the Names or Descriptions following: "Statutum de Admensuratione Terræ" or "Statute for the measuring of Land".	The whole act. (Note: The whole act was repealed by the Statute Law Revision Act 1863 (26 & 27 Vict. c. 125). The note to that act states "Repealed (with other enactments) by 5 Geo. 4. c. 74. s. 23. in manner stated in entry above, opposite Assisa Panis et Cervisie. The parts, if any, of these Instruments to which the express repeal does not extend are obsolete or unnecessary. In Ruffhead's Edition the second of these Instruments is placed, without a translation, in the Appendix of "Obsolete and Curious Acts" (in vol. 1).")
14 Edw. 3. c. 12	Measures and weights	So much of a Statute made in the Fourteenth Year of the Reign of King Edward the Third, as relates to the making of Bushels and Weights, and sending the same into every Country.	The whole act. (Note: The whole act was repealed by the Statute Law Revision Act 1863 (26 & 27 Vict. c. 125). The note to that act states "Repealed (with other enactments) by 5 Geo. 4. c. 74. s. 23. by a description which is sufficient to cover the whole statute (see the notes given in Ruffhead's and Raithby's Editions); but that repeal is made subject to the qualifying words (applicable to this and the other enactments thereby repealed), "so far as the same or any of them relate to the ascertaining or establishing any Standards of Weights and Measures, or to the establishing or recognizing certain differences between Weights and Measures of the same Denomination, but no further or otherwise." Semble the repeal is total, except as to the enactment that there shall be one measure, &c., which is referred to by See Magna Carta (25 Ed. 1.) c. 25. and preamble of 5 Geo. 4. c. 74. See also 5 & 6 Will. 4. c. 63. (provisions as to Copies of Standard and Verification).")
14 Edw. 3. c. 21	Taxation, etc.	So much of the said last-mentioned Statute.	As directs that the Sack of Wool ought to contain Twenty-six Stones, and every Stone Fourteen Pounds.
18 Edw. 3. Stat. 2. c. 4	Weights and measures	So much of a Statute made in the 18 E.3. st. 2. Eighteenth Year of the Reign of the said King Edward the Third, as c.4. relates to Commissioners to assay Weights and Measures	The whole act. (Note: The whole act was repealed by the Statute Law Revision Act 1863 (26 & 27 Vict. c. 125). The note to that act states "Repealed (with other enactments) by 5 Geo. 4. c. 74. s. 23. by a description which is sufficient to cover the whole statute (see the notes given in Ruffhead's and Raithby's Editions); but that repeal is made subject to the qualifying words (applicable to this and the other enactments thereby repealed), "so far as the same or any of them relate to the ascertaining or establishing any Standards of Weights and Measures, or to the establishing or recognizing certain differences between Weights and Measures of the same Denomination, but no further or otherwise." If repeal not total, this Act may be regarded as spent in part, unnecessary as to residue. In Ruffhead's edition treated as expired, and an abstract only given.")
25 Edw. 3. Stat. 5. c. 9	Weights	So much of a Statute made in the Parliament summoned at Westminster on the Feast of Saint Hilary, in the Twenty-fifth Year of the Reign of the said King Edward the Third.	As relates to Auncel Weight, and the Weight of the Sack of Wool. (Note: The whole act was repealed by the Statute Law Revision Act 1863 (26 & 27 Vict. c. 125). The note to that act states "Repealed in part by 5 Geo. 4. c. 74. s. 23. Residue unnecessary. (Confirmed by 5 Hen. 6. c. 5.)")
25 Edw. 3. Stat. 5. c. 10	Measures	So much of a Statute made in the Parliament summoned at Westminster on the Feast of Saint Hilary, in the Twenty-fifth Year of the Reign of the said King Edward the Third, as relates to the Bushel, Half Bushel, Peck, Gallon, Pottle, and Quart, and to the Quarter and Measure of Corn.	The whole act. (Note: The whole act was repealed by the Statute Law Revision Act 1863 (26 & 27 Vict. c. 125). The note to that act states "Repealed in part expressly, and as to residue virtually, by 5 Geo. 4. c. 74. s. 23.")
27 Edw. 3. Stat. 2. c. 10	There shall be but one weight, measure and yard through the realm.	So much of the Statute or Ordinance of the Staples, made in the Twenty-seventh Year of the Reign of the said King Edward the Third, as relates to the Uniformity of Weights and Measures throughout the Realm.	The whole act.
31 Edw. 3. Stat. 1. c. 2	Wool Act 1357	A Statute made in the Thirty-first Year of the Reign of King Edward the Third.	As relates to the regulating the Price and Weight of Wools.
31 Edw. 3. Stat. 1. c. 5	Wine	A Statute made in the Thirty-first Year of the Reign of King Edward the Third, as relates to the Tun of Wine and the gauging thereof.	The whole act.
34 Edw. 3. c. 5	Weights and Measures Act 1361	A Statute made in the Thirty-fourth Year of the Reign of King Edward the Third, whereby Justices of the Peace are empowered to inquire of Weights and Measures.	The whole act. (Note: The whole act was repealed by the Statute Law Revision Act 1863 (26 & 27 Vict. c. 125). The note to that act states "Repealed (with other enactments) by 5 Geo. 4. c. 74. s. 23. by a description which is sufficient to cover the whole statute; but that repeal is made subject to the qualifying words (applicable to this and the other enactments thereby repealed), so far as the same or any of them relate to the ascertaining or establishing any standards of Weights and Measures, or to the establishing or recognizing certain differences between Weights and Measures of the same denomination, but no further or otherwise." So far as this Act is not repealed by 5 Geo. 4. c. 74. s. 23. the repeal is consequentially by the repeal in the present Bill of 25 Ed. 3. Stat. 5. c. 9. And see 5 & 6 Will. 4. c. 63. s. 28.")
4 Ric. 2. c. 1	Gauging of vessels of wine, etc.	A Statute made in the Fourth Year of the Reign of King Richard the Second, as relates to the gauging of Vessels of Wine, Honey, Oil, and other Liquors brought into the Realm.	The whole act.
13 Ric. 2. Stat. 1. c. 9	Weights and Measures Act 1389	A Statute made in the Thirteenth Year of the Reign of King Richard the Second.	As relates to the regulating of Weights and Measures, and to the buying and selling of Wool at Fourteen Pounds the Stone. (Note: The whole act was repealed by the Statute Law Revision Act 1863 (26 & 27 Vict. c. 125). The note to that act states "Repealed in part (Weights and Measures) by 5 Geo. 4. c. 74. s. 23. The repeal is of "so much as relates to regulating of Weights and Measures, and to the buying and selling of Corn at Fourteen Pounds to the Stone;" and see the qualifying words at the beginning and end of the repealing enactment. The repeal, it would seem, extends to all that relates directly or indirectly to Weights and Measures, yet not all; so much as is not covered by the repeal may be considered unnecessary and superfluous. (And see 5 & 6 Will. 4. c. 63.) Residue (from " and that no Denizen or Foreigner" to the end) obsolete.")
15 Ric. 2. c. 4	Measures	A Statute made in the Fifteenth Year of the Reign of King Richard the Second, as relates to Weights and Measures of Corn, Wine, Ale, and Malt.	The whole act. (Note: The whole act was repealed by the Statute Law Revision Act 1863 (26 & 27 Vict. c. 125). The note to that act states "Repealed by 5 Geo. 4. c. 74. s. 23. (with other enactments) "so far as the same or any of them relate to the ascertaining or establishing any Standards of Weights and Measures, or to the establishing or recognizing certain Differences between Weights and Measures of the same denomination, but no further or otherwise." Notwithstanding this qualification, the repeal of this Act was intended to be total.")
16 Ric. 2. c. 3	Weights and Measures Act 1392	A Statute made in the Sixteenth Year of the Reign of King Richard the Second.	As relates to the Clerk of the Market, and the Assay of Weights and Measures made by him, and the using such Weights and Measures. (Note: The whole act was repealed by the Statute Law Revision Act 1863 (26 & 27 Vict. c. 125). The note to that act states "Repealed by 5 Geo. 4. c. 74. s. 23. as follows, "so much as relates to the Clerk of the Market and the Assay of Weights and Measures made by him, and the using such Weights and Measures." See qualifying words at beginning and end of s. 23. The repeal seems to cover all, except from " And the King willeth." Residue unnecessary; see— 5 Geo. 4. c. 74. 5 & 6 Will. 4. c. 63.")
1 Hen. 5. c. 10	Corn Measure Act 1413	A Statute made in the First Year of the Reign of King Henry the Fifth, as concerns the true Measure Corn, or as is intituled An Act concerning the true Measure of Corn.	The whole act. (Note: The whole act was repealed by the Statute Law Revision Act 1863 (26 & 27 Vict. c. 125). The note to that act states "Repealed (with other Acts) by 5 Geo. 4. c. 74. s. 23., by a description which is sufficient to cover the whole Chapter (see the title given in Ruffhead's Edition); but that repeal is made subject to the qualifying words (applicable to this and the other enactments thereby repealed), "so far as the same or any of them relate to the ascertaining or establishing any standards of Weights and Measures, or to the establishing or recognizing certain differences between Weights and Measures of the same denomination, but no further or otherwise." Notwithstanding this qualification, however, the repeal of this chapter may, it would seem, be considered total (see as to Bushels and Quarters 5 Geo. 4. c. 74. s. 6.); and if any part is not strictly comprised in the repeal that part may be regarded as obsolete. And as to Purveyance see 12 Car. 2. c. 24. ss. 11-13. (ss. 12-14 in Ruffhead's Edition). In Ruffhead's Edition the whole chapter is treated as obsolete, and an abstract is only given.")
2 Hen. 6. c. 14	Measures Act 1423	A Statute made in the Second Year of the Reign of King Henry the Sixth, as relates to the several Measures of Vessels of Wine, Eels, Herrings, and Salmon.	The whole act.
8 Hen. 6. c. 5	Weights, etc. Act 1429	A Statute made in the Eighth Year of the Reign of King Henry the Sixth, as relates to the confirming and amending former Statutes concerning Weights and Measures, and requiring common Balances and Weights to be kept in all Cities, Boroughs, and Towns.	The whole act. (Note: The whole act was repealed by the Statute Law Revision Act 1863 (26 & 27 Vict. c. 125). The note to that act states "Repealed by 21 Jac. 1. c. 28. s. 11. in part, namely, the enactment "that no man buy yarn of wool called woollen yarn, unless he will make cloth thereof." Repeated (with other enactments) by 5 Geo. 5. c. 74. s. 23. by description which is sufficient to cover the whole chapter (see the title given in Raithby's Edition), but that repeal is made subject to the qualifying words (applicable to this and the other enactments thereby repealed) "so far as the same or any of them relate to the ascertaining or establishing any standards of Weights and Measures, or to the establishing or recognizing certain differences between Weights and Measures of the same denomination." Notwithstanding this qualification, however, the repeal of this chapter (as far as it was not repealed by 21 Jac. 1. c. 28. s. 11.) may, it would seem, be considered total; and if any part is not strictly comprised in the express repeal, it must, it would seem, be regarded as superseded by 5 Geo. 3. c. 63., or as obsolete or unnecessary.")
9 Hen. 6. c. 6	Weights (Dorchester)	Statute made in the Ninth Year of the Reign of King Henry the Sixth, as relates to the explaining the said Statute of the Eighth Year of King Henry the Sixth, concerning Weights and Measures, so far as relates to the Burgesses of Dorchester.	The whole act.
9 Hen. 6. c. 8	Weight of a Wey of Cheese	The said Statute made in the Ninth Year of King Henry the Sixth, as relates to the Weight of a Wey of Cheese.	The whole act.
11 Hen. 6. c. 8	Weights and Measures Act 1433	A Statute made in the Eleventh Year of the Reign of King Henry the Sixth, as relates to the confirming and amending former Statutes concerning Weights and Measures.	The whole act. (Note: The whole act was repealed by the Statute Law Revision Act 1863 (26 & 27 Vict. c. 125). The note to that act states "Repealed (with other enactments) by 5 Geo. 5. c. 74. s. 23. by a description, which is sufficient to cover the whole chapter (see the title given in Raithby's Edition), but that repeal is made subject to the qualifying words (applicable to this and the other enactments thereby repealed) "so far as the same or any of them relate to the ascertaining or establishing any standards of Weights and Measures, or to the establishing or recognizing certain differences between Weights and Measures of the same denomination." Notwithstanding this qualification, however, the repeal of this chapter may, it would seem, be considered total; and if any part of the chapter is not strictly comprised in the express repeal, it must, it would seem, be regarded as virtually repealed by the repeal (by 5 Geo. 5. c. 75. s. 23.) of the Acts confirmed and amended, or as relating to the marking or keeping of a Common Bushel, which may be regarded as obsolete.")
18 Hen. 6. c. 17	Vessels of Wine, etc. Act 1439	A Statute made in the Eighteenth Year of the Reign of King Henry the Sixth, as relates to the gauging of Vessels of Wine, Oyl, and Honey.	The whole act.
22 Edw. 4. c. 2	Fish Act 1482	A Statute made in the Twenty-second Year of King Edward the Fourth, as relates to the packing of Barrelled Fish, or as is intitutled An Act for packing of Barrelled Fish.	The whole act. (Note: The whole act was repealed by the Statute Law Revision Act 1863 (26 & 27 Vict. c. 125). The note to that act states "Repealed by 5 Geo.5. c. 74. s. 23. (with other Acts) "so far as the same or any of them relate to the ascertaining or establishing any Standards of Weights and Measures, or to the establishing or recognizing certain differences between Weights and Measures of the same denomination, but no farther or otherwise." If any part remains unrepealed, it may be regarded as obsolete. (Confirmed by 11 Hen. 7. c. 23.)")
1 Ric. 3. c. 13	Vessels of Wine, etc. Act 1483	The Whole of an Act made in the First Year of the Reign of King Richard the Third, intituled An Act to ascertain the Contents of Keels of Tyme and Oil, or An Act for the Contents of a Butt of Malmsey.	The whole act.
7 Hen. 7. c. 3; 7 Hen. 7. c. 4	Weights and Measures Act 1491	An Act made in the Seventh Year of the Reign of King Henry the Seventh, intituled An Act for Weights and Measures.	The whole act. (Note: The whole act was repealed by the Statute Law Revision Act 1863 (26 & 27 Vict. c. 125). The note to that act states "Repealed (with other enactments) by 5 Geo. 4. c. 74. s. 23. by a description which is sufficient to cover the whole chapter, but that repeal is made subject to the qualifying words (applicable to this and the other enactments thereby repealed) viz. "so far as the same or any of them relate to the ascertaining or establishing any Standards of Weights and Measures, or to the establishing or recognizing certain differences between Weights and Measures of the same denomination." Notwithstanding this qualification, however, the repeal of this chapter may, it would seem, be considered total; but, if not, so much as is not strictly comprised in the express repeal must, it would seem, be regarded as superseded by 5 & 6 Will. 4. c. 63. ss. 23, 24, or as obsolete or unnecessary. In Ruffhead's Edition the Act seems to be treated as repealed by 11 Hen. 7. c. 4.")
7 Hen. 7. c. 7; 7 Hen. 7. c. 8	Customs Act 1491	Another Act made in the same Seventh Year of the Reign of King Henry the Seventh, intituled An Act to pay Custom for every Butt of Malmsey.	The whole act. (Note: The whole act was repealed by the Statute Law Revision Act 1863 (26 & 27 Vict. c. 125). The note to that act states "Repealed by 3 Geo. 4. c. 41. s. 2., but see saving in s. 9. Repealed by 5 Geo. 4. c. 74. s. 23. (with other enactments) "so far as the "same or any of them relate to the ascertaining or establishing any Standards of Weights and Measures, or to the establishing or recognizing certain differences between Weights and Measures of he same denominations, but no further or otherwise." If any part remains unrepealed, it may be regarded as obsolete. In Ruffhead's Edition the Act is treated as expired, and an abstract only is given.")
11 Hen. 7. c. 4	Weights and Measures Act 1495	An Act made in the Eleventh Year of the Reign of King Henry the Seventh, intituled An Act for Weights and Measures.	The whole act. (Note: The whole act was repealed by the Statute Law Revision Act 1863 (26 & 27 Vict. c. 125). The note to that act states "Repealed (with other enactments) by 5 Geo. 4. c. 74. s. 23. by a description which is sufficient to cover the whole chapter; but the repeal is made subject to the qualifying words (applicable to this and the other enactments thereby repealed) "so far as the same or any of them relate to the ascertaining or establishing any standards of Weights and Measures, or to the establishing or recognizing certain differences between Weights and Measures of the same denomination." It would seem that notwithstanding this qualification the repeal of the chapter may be considered total; but if any part is not strictly comprised in the express repeal it may be regarded as superseded by— 5 Geo. 4. c. 74, 5 & 6 Will. 4. c. 63, or as obsolete or unnecessary.")
12 Hen. 7. c. 5	Weights and Measures Act 1496	An Act made in the Twelfth Year of the Reign of King Henry the Seventh, intituled An Act for Weights and Measures.	The whole act. (Note: The whole act was repealed by the Statute Law Revision Act 1863 (26 & 27 Vict. c. 125). The note to that act states "Repealed (with other enactments) by 5 Geo. 4. c. 74. s. 23. by a description which is sufficient to cover the whole chapter; but the repeal is made subject to the qualifying words (applicable to this and the other enactments thereby repealed) "so far as the same or any of them relate to the ascertaining or establishing any standards of Weights and Measures, or to the establishing or recognizing certain differences between Weights and Measures of the same denomination." It would seem that notwithstanding this qualification the repeal of the chapter may be considered total; but if any part is not strictly comprised in the express repeal it may be regarded as superseded by— 5 Geo. 4. c. 74, 5 & 6 Will. 4. c. 63, or as obsolete or unnecessary.")
23 Hen. 8. c. 4	Brewers and Coopers Act 1531	An Act made in the Twenty-third Year of the Reign of King Henry the Eighth, intituled An Act that no Brewers of Beer or Ale shall make their Barrels, Kilderkins, or Firkins within them, and how much the same Barrels, et cetera, shall contain.	The whole act. (Note: The whole act was repealed by the Statute Law Revision Act 1863 (26 & 27 Vict. c. 125). The note to that act states "Repealed in part (Price of Barrels, &c.) in qualified terms by 8 Eliz. c. 9. s. 1. (s. 3. in Ruffhead's Edition). Repealed (with other enactments) by 5 Geo. 4. c. 74. s. 23. by a description which is sufficient to cover the whole chapter (see the title given in Raithby's Edition), but that repeal is made subject to qualifying words applicable to this and the other enactments thereby repealed (see the entry opposite 14 Ed. 3. st. 1. c. 12). And see as to Price of Beer 2 Geo. 3. c. 14. s. 1. Obsolete so far as not repealed.")
24 Hen. 8. c. 6	Sale of Wines Act 1532	An Act made in the Twenty-fourth Year of the Reign of King Henry the Eighth, intituled An Act concerning Sale of Wines.	The whole act. (Note: This act was repealed by the Continuance, etc. of Laws Act 1623 (21 Jas. 1. c. 28).)
12 Eliz. 1. c. 3 (I)	N/A	An Act made in the Parliament of Ireland in the Twenty-eighth Year of the Reign of Queen Elizabeth, intituled An Act for the establishing the Standard of Measures for Corn within certain Shires of this Realm.	The whole act.
13 Eliz. 1. c. 11	Navigation Act 1571	An Act made in the Thirteenth Year of the Reign of Queen Elizabeth, intituled An Act for the Maintenance of the Navigation.	As relates to the Assize of Herring Barrels. (Note: The rest of the act had been repealed by sections 2 and 9 of the Repeal of Acts Concerning Importation Act 1822 (3 Geo. 4. c. 41).)
23 Eliz. 1. c. 8	Wax Act 1580	An Act made in the Twenty-third Year of the Reign of Queen Elizabeth, intituled An Act touching the true making, making and working of Wax.	As relates to the Barrel, Kilderkin, or Firkin of Honey.
43 Eliz. 1. c. 14	Assise of Fuel Act 1601	The Whole of an Act, made in the Forty-third Year of Queen Elizabeth, intituled An Act concerning the Assize of Fuel	The whole act. (Note: The whole act was repealed by the Statute Law Revision Act 1863 (26 & 27 Vict. c. 125). The note to that act states "Repealed by 5 Geo. 4. c. 74. s. 23., but see qualifying words at beginning and end of repealing enactment. If, however, any part of this Act is not comprised in the express repeal, it may be regarded as virtually repealed by 11 & 12 Vict. c. 49., 14 & 15 Vict. c. 7., 19 & 20 Vict. c. 64., or as spent.")
16 Cha. 1. c. 19	Clerk of the Market Act 1640	An Act made in the Sixteenth Year of the Reign of King Charles the First, intituled An Act for the better ordering and regulating of the Office of Clerk of the Market, allowed and confirmed by this Statute; and for the Reformation of false Weights and Measures.	The whole act. (Note: The whole act was repealed by the Statute Law Revision Act 1863 (26 & 27 Vict. c. 125). The note to that act states "Repealed in part by 22 Car. 2. c. 8. s. 1. (s. 2. in Ruffhead's Edition). Repealed by 5 Geo. 4. c. 74. s. 23., but see the qualifying words at the beginning and end of the repealing enactment. This Act is, however, obsolete as to Clerk of the Market, and as to residue, so far as not covered by the express repeal in 5 Geo. 4. c. 74. s. 23., may be considered, it is apprehended, as virtually repealed by that Act and 5 & 6 Will. 4. c. 63.")
12 Cha. 2. c. 23	Excise (No. 3) Act 1660	An Act made in the Twelfth Year of the Reign of King Charles the Second, intituled A Grant of certain Impositions upon Beer, Ale, and other Liquors, for the Increase of His Majesty's Revenue during his Life.	As relates to the Contents of the Barrel of Beer and Ale.
22 Cha. 2. c. 8	Measures Act 1670	An Act made in the Twenty-second Year of the Reign of King Charles the Second, intituled An Act for ascertaining the Measures of Corn and Salt.	The whole act. (Note: The whole act was repealed by the Statute Law Revision Act 1863 (26 & 27 Vict. c. 125). The note to that act states "Spent in part. Repealed by 5 Geo. 4. c. 74. s. 23. (but see qualifying words at beginning and end of repealing enactment). But if not wholly repealed expressly by that Act, so much of this Act as is not so repealed may be considered virtually repealed by that Act and 5 & 6 Will. 4. c. 63., or obsolete.")
22 & 23 Cha. 2. c. 12	Measures (No. 2) Act 1670	An Act made in the Parliament holden in the Twenty-second and Twenty-third Years of the Reign of the said King Charles the Second, intituled An additional Act for ascertaining the Measures of Corn and Salt.	The whole act. (Note: The whole act was repealed by the Statute Law Revision Act 1863 (26 & 27 Vict. c. 125). The note to that act states "Spent in part. Repealed by 5 Geo. 4. c. 74. s. 23. (but see qualifying words at beginning and end of repealing enactment). But if not wholly repealed expressly by that Act, so much of this Act as is not so repealed may be considered virtually repealed by that Act and 5 & 6 Will. 4. c. 63., or obsolete.")
1 Will. & Mar. c. 24; 1 Will. & Mar. Sess. 1. c. 24	Excise Act 1688	An Act made in the First Year of the Reign of King William and Queen Mary, intituled An Act for an additional Duty of Excise upon Beer or Ale and other Liquors.	As relates to the Contents of the Barrel of Beer and Ale.
5 & 6 Will. & Mar. c. 7; 5 Will. & Mar. c. 7	House of Commons (Disqualification) Act 1693	An Act made in the Fifth and Sixth Years of the Reign of King William and Queen Mary, made, among other Things, for granting to their Majesties certain Rates and Duties upon Salt, and upon Beer, Ale, and other Liquors.	As relates to the Weight or Measure of Salt.
7 Will. 3. c. 24 (I)	N/A	An Act made (in the Parliament of Ireland) in the Seventh Year of the Reign of King William the Third, for the better regulating of Measures in and throughout that Kingdom.	The whole act. (Note: The whole act was repealed by the Statute Law Revision (Ireland) Act 1879 (42 & 43 Vict. c. 24).)
7 & 8 Will. 3. c. 31	Taxation, etc. (No. 2) Act 1695	An Act made in the Seventh and Eighth Years of the Reign of King William the Third, made, among other Things, for continuing to His Majesty certain Duties upon Salt, Glass Wares, and Earthen Wares.	As relates to the Measure and Weight of Salt.
9 Will. 3. c. 6; 9 & 10 Will. 3. c. 6	Sale of Salt Act 1697	An Act made in the Ninth and Tenth Years of the Reign of King William the Third, intituled An Act that all Retailers of Salt shall sell by Weight.	The whole act. (Note: The whole act was repealed by the Statute Law Revision Act 1867 (30 & 31 Vict. c. 59). The note to that act states "Repealed by 5 Geo. 4. c. 74. s. 23., but see qualifying words at beginning and end of repealing enactment. But if not wholly repealed by that Act, so much as is not so repealed falls as follows; namely,— sects. 1, 2. repeal consequential on repeal by present Bill of 7 & 8 Will. 3. c. 31. or obsolete; see repeal by 19 & 20 Vict. c. 64. of 1 Ann. c. 15. (Stat. 1. c. 21. in Ruffhead's Edition) which (in s. 25. s. 28. in Ruffhead's Edition) enforces these provisions. residue, repeal consequential on repeal by present Bill of 7 & 8 Will. 3. c. 31.")
10 Will. 3. c. 21; 10 & 11 Will. 3. c. 21	Taxation Act 1698	An Act made in the Tenth and Eleventh Years of the Reign of King William the Third, made, among other Things, for levying further Duties upon Sweets, and for lessening the Duties, as well upon Vinegar as upon certain Low Wines.	As relates to the Contents of a Barrel of Vinegar, Vinegar Beer, or Liquor preparing for Vinegar.
10 Will. 3. c. 22; 10 & 11 Will. 3. c. 22	Taxation (Rock Salt) Act 1698	Another Act made in the same Tenth and Eleventh Years of the Reign of the said King William the Third, intituled An Act for in the more full and effectual charging of the Duties upon Rock Salt.	As relates to the Weight or Measure of Rock Salt.
11 Will. 3. c. 15; 11 & 12 Will. 3. c. 15	Ale Measures Act 1698	An Act made in the Eleventh and Twelfth Years of the Reign of King William the Third, intituled An Act for the ascertaining the Measures for retailing Ale and Beer.	The whole act. (Note: The whole act was repealed by the Statute Law Revision Act 1867 (30 & 31 Vict. c. 59). The note to that act states "Repealed by 5 Geo. 4. c. 74. s. 23., but see qualifying words at the beginning and end of repealing enactment. This Act, if not wholly repealed by the above-mentioned enactment, is virtually repealed or superseded; see— 5 Geo. 4. c. 74. s. 21. 5 & 6 Will. 4. c. 63. ss. 21., &c., except so much of s. 2. as prohibits Detention of Goods, and allows Action only by Innkeeper, &c. refusing to give account as therein mentioned. In 1 Burn, J.P. 121 (29th Ed.) it is said that this portion of s. 2. was not repealed by 5 Geo. 4. c. 74. s. 23: this, however, is probably not so; it is, however, to be regarded as obsolete or unnecessary.")
1 Ann. c. 9; 1 Ann. St. 1. c. 15	Water Measure of Fruit Act 1702	An Act made in the First Year of the Reign of Queen Anne, intituled An Act to c.15. ascertain the Water Measure of Fruit	The whole act.
1 Ann. c. 15; 1 Ann. St. 1. c. 21	Salt Duties, etc. Act 1702	An made in the same First Year of the Reign of Queen Anne, intituled An Act for preventing Frauds in the Duties upon Salt, and for the better Payment of Debentures at the Custom House.	As relates to the Weight and Measure of Foreign Salt and Rock Salt.
2 Ann. c. 17 (I)	N/A	An Act made (in the Parliament of Ireland) in the Second Year of the Reign of Queen Anne, for supplying the Defects of the hereinbefore recited Act, passed in the Parliament of Ireland in the Seventh Year of the Reign of King William the Third.	The whole act. (Note: The whole act was repealed by the Statute Law Revision (Ireland) Act 1879 (42 & 43 Vict. c. 24).)
5 Ann. c. 15; 6 Ann. c. 21	Taxation (No. 5) Act 1706	An Act made in the Fifth and Sixth Years of the Reign of Queen Anne, intituled An Act for continuing several Subsidies, Impositions, and Duties, and for making Provisions therein mentioned, to raise Money by way of Loan for the Service of the War, and other Her Majesty's necessary and important Occasions; and for ascertaining the Wine Measure.	As relates to the Contents of the Gallon, Tun, Butt, Pipe, and Hogshead of Wine.
9 Ann. c. 6	Lotteries Act 1710	An Act made in the Ninth Year of the Reign of Queen Anne, made, among in part. other Things, for reviving, continuing, and appropriating certain Duties upon several Commodities to be exported, and certain Duties upon Coals to be waterborne and carried coastwise.	As relates to the Chaldron or Chalder and Bushel of Coals.
9 Ann. c. 20; 9 Ann. c. 15	Assise of Fuel Act 1710	An Act made in the said Ninth Year of the Reign of Queen Anne, for making more effectual the herein-before recited Act of the Forty-third Year of the Reign of Queen Elizabeth, concerning the Assize of Fuel.	The whole act. (Note: The whole act was repealed by the Statute Law Revision Act 1867 (30 & 31 Vict. c. 59). The note to that act states "Repealed by 5 Geo. 4. c. 74. s. 23., but see qualifying words at beginning and end of repealing enactment. If, however, any part of this Act is not comprised in that repeal, it may be regarded as obsolete")
10 Ann. c. 5; 10 Ann. c. 6	Assise of Fuel Act 1711	An Act made in the Tenth Year of the Reign of Queen Anne, intituled An Act for explaining and altering the Laws now in being concerning the Assizes of Fuel, so far as they relate to the Assize of Billet made or to be made of Beech Wood only.	The whole act. (Note: The whole act was repealed by the Statute Law Revision Act 1867 (30 & 31 Vict. c. 59). The note to that act states "Repealed by 5 Geo. 4. c. 74. s. 23., but see qualifying words at beginning and end of repealing enactment. If, however, any part of this Act is not comprised in that repeal, it may be regarded as obsolete")
1 Geo. 2. c. 21 (I)	N/A	An Act made (in the Parliament of Ireland) in the in part. First Year of the Reign of King George the Second, intituled An Act for preventing Combinations to enhance the Prices, and for avoiding Exactions and Abuses formerly practised in the Sale and Measure of Coals.	As relates to the Dimensions of the Half Barrel, Bushel, Half Bushel, Peck, or Half Peck of Coals.
8 Geo. 2. c. 12	Salt Duties, etc. Act 1734	An Act made in the Eighth Year of the Reign of King George the Second, made, among other Things, for granting and continuing the Duties upon Salt and upon Red and White Herrings.	As relates to the Computation of the Distance in Miles between the Pits and Refineres of Rock Salt.
9 Geo. 2. c. 9 (I)	N/A	An Act made (in the Parliament of Ireland) in the Ninth Year of the Reign of King George the Second, intituled An Act for the ascertaining the Gauge and the Meаsure of Barrels and Half Barrels used by Brewers in selling Beer, Ale, and Small Beer.	The whole act.
24 Geo. 2. c. 31	Linen and Hempen Manufactures (Scotland) Act 1750	The Statute made in the Twenty-fourth Year of the Reign of King George the Second, intituled An Act for explaining, amending, and enforcing an Act passed in the Thirteenth Year of His late Majesty's Reign, intituled& An Act for the better Regulation of the Linen and Hempen Maпufactures in that Part of Great Britain called Scotland, and for further regulating and encouraging the said Manufactures.	As relates to the Weight of Hemp or Flax.
26 Geo. 3. c. 35 (I)	N/A	An Act made (in the Parliament of Ireland) in the Twenty-sixth Year of the Reign of His late Majesty King George the Third, for preventing Frauds in the Measurement of Lime.	The whole act. (Note: The whole act was repealed by the Statute Law Revision (Ireland) Act 1879 (42 & 43 Vict. c. 24).)
38 Geo. 3. c. 89	Salt Duties Act 1798	An Act made in the Thirty-eighth Year of the Reign of His late Majesty King George the Third, intituled An Act for transferring the Management of the Salt Duties to the Commissioners of Excise, and for repealing the Duties on Salt, and the Drawbacks, Allowances, and Bounties thereon.	As relates to the Weight of a Bushel of Salt.
43 Geo. 3. c. 69	Excise Act 1803	An Act made in the Forty-third Year of the Reign of His late Majesty King George the Third, intituled An Act to repeal the Duties of Excise payable in Great Britain, and to grant other Duties in lieu thereof.	As relates to he Quart, Gallon, and Barrel of Beer or Ale.

Section 24 of the act provided that nothing in the act would repeal the Westminster Act 1757 (31 Geo. 2. c. 17)

The qualified terms of repeal led to led to several acts being repealed by later Statute Law Revision Acts, including:

- Statute Law Revision Act 1863 (6 & 27 Vict. c. 125)
- Statute Law Revision Act 1867 (30 & 31 Vict. c. 59)

Weights and Measures Act 1825
- Act of Parliament
- Parliament of the United Kingdom
- Long title: An Act to prolong the Time of the Commencement of an Act of the last Session of Parliament, for ascertaining and establishing Uniformity of Weights and Measures and to amend the said Act.
- Citation: 6 Geo. 4 c. 12
- Territorial extent: United Kingdom

Dates
- Royal assent: 31 March 1825
- Commencement: 31 March 1825 (Note: The Acts of Parliament (Commencement) Act 1793.)
- Repealed: 1 January 1879
Other legislation
Amends	Weights and Measures Act 1824
Amended by	Weights and Measures Act 1834; Statute Law Revision Act 1873
Repealed by	Weights and Measures Act 1878

Status: Repealed

Text of statute as originally enacted

Weights and Measures Act 1825 (6 Geo. 4 c. 12)

The act extended the commencement of the Weights and Measures Act 1824 (5 Geo. 4. c. 74), and the associated repeals of enactments by that act, from 1 May 1825 to 1 January 1826.

An Act to prolong the Time of the Commencement of an Act of the last Session of Parliament, for ascertaining and establishing Uniformity of Weights and Measures and to amend the said Act.

Weights and Measures Act 1834
- Act of Parliament
- Parliament of the United Kingdom
- Long title: An Act to amend and render more effectual Two Acts of the Fifth and Sixth Years of the Reign of His late Majesty King George the Fourth, relating to Weights and Measures.
- Citation: 4 & 5 Will. 4. c. 49
- Territorial extent: United Kingdom

Dates
- Royal assent: 13 August 1834
- Commencement: 13 August 1834
- Repealed: 9 September 1835
Other legislation
Amends	Weights and Measures Act 1824; Weights and Measures Act 1825
Repealed by	Weights and Measures Act 1835

Status: Repealed

Text of statute as originally enacted

Weights and Measures Act 1834 (4 & 5 Will. 4. c. 49)

An Act to amend and render more effectual Two Acts of the Fifth and Sixth Years of the Reign of His late Majesty King George the Fourth, relating to Weights and Measures.

Weights and Measures Act 1835
- Act of Parliament
- Parliament of the United Kingdom
- Long title: An Act to repeal an Act of the Fourth and Fifth Year of His present Majesty relating to Weights and Measures, and to make other Provisions instead thereof.
- Citation: 5 & 6 Will. 4 c. 63
- Territorial extent: United Kingdom

Dates
- Royal assent: 9 September 1835
- Commencement: 9 September 1835
- Repealed: 1 January 1879
Other legislation
Amends	Weights and Measures Act 1705; Unlawful Weights (Ireland) Act 1824
Repeals/revokes	Weights and Measures Act 1834
Amended by	Weights and Measures Act 1859; Standards of Weights, Measures, and Coinage Act 1866; Statute Law Revision Act 1874
Repealed by	Weights and Measures Act 1878

Status: Repealed

Text of statute as originally enacted

Weights and Measures Act 1835 5 & 6 Will. 4. c. 63 (1835)

Also known as the Weights and Measures Act 1835; originally entitled An Act to repeal an Act of the Fourth and Fifth Year of His present Majesty relating to Weights and Measures, and to make other Provisions instead thereof.
Established the imperial stone and hundredweight of 14 and 112 lbs. respectively, based on the wool stone of Edward III.

Weights and Measures Act 1855
- Act of Parliament
- Parliament of the United Kingdom
- Long title: An Act for legalising and preserving the restored Standards of Weights and Measures.
- Citation: 18 & 19 Vict. c. 72
- Territorial extent: United Kingdom

Dates
- Royal assent: 30 July 1855
- Commencement: 30 July 1855
- Repealed: 1 January 1879
Other legislation
Amends	Weights and Measures Act 1824
Amended by	Standards of Weights, Measures, and Coinage Act 1866; Statute Law Revision Act 1875
Repealed by	Weights and Measures Act 1878

Status: Repealed

Text of statute as originally enacted

Weights and Measures Act 1855 (18 & 19 Vict. c. 72)

An Act for legalising and preserving the restored Standards of Weights and Measures.
The 1834 burning of Parliament had destroyed the physical standards referred to in earlier statues; the 1835 act ignored this fact. New copies were created in accordance with the advice of a scientific commission, and the 1855 act made them the "restored Standards".

... the Imperial Standard Pound Avoirdupois and shall be deemed to be the only Standard Measure of Weight from which all other Weights and other Measures having Reference ...

Weights and Measures Act 1859
- Act of Parliament
- Parliament of the United Kingdom
- Long title: An Act to amend the Act of the fifth and sixth years of King William the Fourth, chapter sixty-three, relating to weights and measures.
- Citation: 22 & 23 Vict. c. 56
- Territorial extent: England and Wales; Scotland; (Note: Section 12.)

Dates
- Royal assent: 13 August 1859
- Commencement: 13 August 1859
- Repealed: 1 January 1879
Other legislation
Amends	Weights and Measures Act 1835
Amended by	Statute Law Revision Act 1875
Repealed by	Weights and Measures Act 1878

Status: Repealed

Text of statute as originally enacted

Weights and Measures Act 1859 (22 & 23 Vict. c. 56)

An Act to amend the Act of the fifth and sixth years of King William the Fourth, chapter sixty-three, relating to weights and measures.

Metric Weights and Measures Act 1864
- Act of Parliament
- Parliament of the United Kingdom
- Long title: An Act to render permissive the Use of the Metric System of Weights and Measures.
- Citation: 27 & 28 Vict. c. 117
- Territorial extent: United Kingdom

Dates
- Royal assent: 29 July 1864
- Commencement: 29 July 1864
- Repealed: 1 January 1879
Other legislation
Repealed by	Weights and Measures Act 1878

Status: Repealed

Text of statute as originally enacted

Metric Weights and Measures Act 1864 (27 & 28 Vict. c. 117)

An Act to render permissive the Use of the Metric System of Weights and Measures.

Weights and Measures Act 1878 (41 & 42 Vict. c. 49)

An Act to consolidate the Law relating to Weights and Measures.
This statute abolished the troy pound, effective January 1879.

{{Infobox UK legislation

| short_title = Weights and Measures Act 1889 (Note: Section 39.) | type = Act | parliament = Parliament of the United Kingdom | long_title = An Act for amending the Law relating to Weights and Measures and for other purposes connected therewith. | year = 1889 | citation = 52 & 53 Vict. c. 21 | territorial_extent = United Kingdom | royal_assent = 26 July 1889 | commencement = 1 January 1890 (Note: Section 37.) | repeal_date =

- England and Wales and Scotland: 31 July 1965
- Northern Ireland: 13 April 1977

| amends = Weights and Measures Act 1878 | amendments = {{ubli|Weights and Measures Act 1893|Weights and Measures Act 1904|Weights and Measures (Amendment) Act 1926|Sale of Food (Weights and Measures) Act 1926|[[Gas Act 1948[]|[Statute Law Revision Act 1950]]}} | repealing_legislation =

- England and Wales and Scotland: Weights and Measures Act 1963
- Northern Ireland: Weights and Measures Act (Northern Ireland) 1967 and Gas (Northern Ireland) Order 1977

| related_legislation = Weights and Measures (Purchase) Act 1892 | status = Repealed | original_text = https://www.legislation.gov.uk/ukpga/Vict/52-53/21/contents/enacted | use_new_UK-LEG = no | collapsed = yes

}} Weights and Measures Act 1889 (52 & 53 Vict. c. 21)

An Act for amending the Law relating to Weights and Measures and for other purposes connected therewith.

Weights and Measures (Purchase) Act 1892 (Note: Section 4.)
- Act of Parliament
- Parliament of the United Kingdom
- Long title: An Act for authorising County and Borough Councils to purchase Franchises of Weights and Measures.
- Citation: 55 & 56 Vict. c. 18
- Territorial extent: England and Wales (Note: Section 3.)

Dates
- Royal assent: 20 June 1892
- Commencement: 20 June 1892
- Repealed: 31 January 1964
Other legislation
Amended by	Weights and Measures Act 1893; Local Government Act 1933
Repealed by	Weights and Measures Act 1963
Relates to	Weights and Measures Act 1878; Weights and Measures Act 1889

Status: Repealed

Text of statute as originally enacted

Weights and Measures (Purchase) Act 1892 (55 & 56 Vict. c. 18)

An Act for authorising County and Borough Councils to purchase Franchises of Weights and Measures.

Weights and Measures Act 1893 (Note: Section 2.)
- Act of Parliament
- Parliament of the United Kingdom
- Long title: An Act to amend the Law relating to Weights and Measures.
- Citation: 56 & 57 Vict. c. 19
- Territorial extent: United Kingdom

Dates
- Royal assent: 29 June 1893
- Commencement: 1 April 1894
- Repealed: 31 January 1964
Other legislation
Amends	Weights and Measures Act 1878; Weights and Measures Act 1889; Weights and Measures (Purchase) Act 1892
Repealed by	Weights and Measures Act 1963
Relates to	Weights and Measures (Metric System) Act 1897

Status: Repealed

Text of statute as originally enacted

Weights and Measures Act 1893 (56 & 57 Vict. c. 19)

An Act to amend the Law relating to Weights and Measures.

Weights and Measures (Metric System) Act 1897
- Act of Parliament
- Parliament of the United Kingdom
- Long title: An Act to legalise the Use of Weights and Measures of the Metric System.
- Citation: 60 & 61 Vict. c. 46
- Territorial extent: United Kingdom

Dates
- Royal assent: 6 August 1897
- Commencement: 6 August 1897
- Repealed: 31 January 1964
Other legislation
Repealed by	Weights and Measures Act 1963
Relates to	Weights and Measures Act 1878; Weights and Measures Act 1889; Weights and Measures (Purchase) Act 1892; Weights and Measures Act 1893

Status: Repealed

Text of statute as originally enacted

Weights and Measures (Metric System) Act 1897 (60 & 61 Vict. c. 46)

An Act to legalise the Use of Weights and Measures of the Metric System.

Weights and Measures Acts of 1878 to 1893

This collective title encompassed the following acts:
- Weights and Measures Act 1878 (41 & 42 Vict. c 49)
- Weights and Measures Act 1889 (52 & 53 Vict. c 21)
- Weights and Measures (Purchase) Act 1892 (55 & 56 Vict. c. 18)
- Weights and Measures Act 1893 (56 & 57 Vict. c. 19)

==== 20th century ====
Weights and Measures Act 1904
- Act of Parliament
- Parliament of the United Kingdom
- Long title: An Act to amend the Law relating to Weights and Measures.
- Citation: 4 Edw. 7 c. 28
- Territorial extent: United Kingdom

Dates
- Royal assent: 15 August 1904
- Commencement: 1 January 1905
- Repealed: England and Wales and Scotland: 31 January 1964; Northern Ireland:
Other legislation
Amends	Weights and Measures Act 1878; Weights and Measures Act 1889
Amended by	Sale of Food (Weights and Measures) Act 1926; Justices of the Peace Act 1949
Repealed by	Weights and Measures Act 1963
Relates to	England and Wales and Scotland: Weights and Measures (Amendment) Act 1926; Northern Ireland: Weights and Measures Act (Northern Ireland) 1967

Status: Repealed

Text of statute as originally enacted

Weights and Measures Act 1904 (4 Edw. 7 c. 28)

An Act to amend the Law relating to Weights and Measures.

Weights and Measures (Amendment) Act 1926 (Note: Section 5(1).)
- Act of Parliament
- Parliament of the United Kingdom
- Long title: An Act to amend the law with respect to measuring instruments, and with respect to the power to charge fees in connection with the testing of weighing and measuring apparatus.
- Citation: 16 & 17 Geo. 5 c. 8
- Territorial extent: England and Wales; Scotland; (Note: Section 5(2).)

Dates
- Royal assent: 16 June 1926
- Commencement: 16 June 1926
- Repealed: 31 January 1964
Other legislation
Amends	Weights and Measures Act 1889; Weights and Measures (Leather Measurement) Act 1919
Repealed by	Weights and Measures Act 1963
Relates to	Weights and Measures Act 1904; Sale of Food (Weights and Measures) Act 1926

Status: Repealed

Text of statute as originally enacted

Weights and Measures (Amendment) Act 1926 (16 & 17 Geo. 5 c. 8)

An Act to amend the law with respect to measuring instruments, and with respect to the power to charge fees in connection with the testing of weighing and measuring apparatus.

Sale of Food (Weights and Measures) Act 1926 (Note: Section 15(1).)
- Act of Parliament
- Parliament of the United Kingdom
- Long title: An Act to provide for the better protection of the public in relation to the sale of food, including agricultural and horticultural produce.
- Citation: 16 & 17 Geo. 5 c. 63
- Territorial extent: England and Wales; Scotland; (Note: Section 15(4).)

Dates
- Royal assent: 15 December 1926
- Commencement: 1 July 1927 (Note: Section 15(2).)
- Repealed: 31 July 1963
Other legislation
Amends	London Bread Trade Act 1822; Bread Act 1836; Aberdeen Municipality Extension Act 1871; Dundee Police and Improvement Consolidation Act 1882; Weights and Measures Act 1889; Burgh Police (Scotland) Act 1892; Glasgow Corporation and Police Act 1895; Weights and Measures Act 1904; Greenock Corporation Act 1909; Edinburgh Corporation Act 1913
Repeals/revokes	Sale of Tea Act 1922
Repealed by	Weights and Measures Act 1963
Relates to	Weights and Measures (Amendment) Act 1926

Status: Repealed

Text of statute as originally enacted

Sale of Food (Weights and Measures) Act 1926 (16 & 17 Geo. 5 c. 63)

An Act to provide for the better protection of the public in relation to the sale of food, including agricultural and horticultural produce.

Weights and Measures Act 1963 (Note: Section 66(1).)
- Act of Parliament
- Parliament of the United Kingdom
- Long title: An Act to make amended provision with respect to weights and measures, and for connected purposes.
- Citation: 1963 c. 31
- Territorial extent: United Kingdom

Dates
- Royal assent: 31 July 1963
- Commencement: 31 January 1964 (except parts III and IV, section 61(4) and schedules 4–8.); 31 July 1965 (rest of act); (Note: Section 66(2).)
- Repealed: 30 January 1986
Other legislation
Amends	Coal Mines Regulation Act 1887
Repeals/revokes	Weights and Measures Act 1889; Weights and Measures (Purchase) Act 1892; Weights and Measures Act 1893; Weights and Measures (Metric System) Act 1897; Weights and Measures Act 1904; Weights and Measures (Amendment) Act 1926; Sale of Food (Weights and Measures) Act 1926; Weights and Measures Act 1936; Weights and Measures, Sale of Coal (Scotland) Act 1936
Amended by	Statute Law (Repeals) Act 1974; Weights and Measures &c. Act 1976; Statute Law (Repeals) Act 1977; Alcoholic Liquor Duties Act 1979
Repealed by	Weights and Measures Act 1985

Status: Repealed

Text of statute as originally enacted

Weights and Measures Act 1963 (c. 31)

An Act to make amended provision with respect to weights and measures, and for connected purposes.

Weights and Measures &c. Act 1976
- Act of Parliament
- Parliament of the United Kingdom
- Long title: An Act to amend certain enactments relating to weights and measures; and to make provision for the alleviation of shortages of food and other goods.
- Citation: 1976 c. 77
- Territorial extent: United Kingdom (Note: Section 15(3).)

Dates
- Royal assent: 22 November 1976
- Commencement: 22 November 1976 (Note: Except schedules 4 and 5.); 22 December 1976 (Note: Rest of act.)
Other legislation
Amends	Weights and Measures Act 1963; Weights and Measures Act (Northern Ireland) 1967; Criminal Justice Act 1967; Increase of Fines Act (Northern Ireland) 1967
Amended by	Statute Law Revision Act 1948; Statutory Rules (Northern Ireland) Order 1979; Weights and Measures (Northern Ireland) Order 1981; Food Act 1984; Weights and Measures Act 1985; Food Safety Act 1990

Status: Partially repealed

Text of statute as originally enacted

Text of the Weights and Measures &c. Act 1976 as in force today (including any amendments) within the United Kingdom, from legislation.gov.uk.

Weights and Measures etc. Act 1976 (c. 77)

An Act to amend certain enactments relating to weights and measures; and to make provision for the alleviation of shortages of food and other goods.

Weights and Measures Act 1979 (Note: Section 24(1).)
- Act of Parliament
- Parliament of the United Kingdom
- Long title: An Act to make further provision with respect to weights and measures.
- Citation: 1979 c. 45
- Territorial extent: United Kingdom

Dates
- Royal assent: 4 April 1979
- Commencement: Various (Note: Section 24(3).)
- Repealed: 30 January 1986
Other legislation
Repeals/revokes	Cran Measures Act 1908
Repealed by	Weights and Measures Act 1985

Status: Repealed

Text of statute as originally enacted

Weights and Measures Act 1979 (c. 45)

An Act to make further provision with respect to weights and measures.
This act introduces the average quantity principle for packaged goods into UK law for the first time. The 1979 act was replaced by part V of the 1985 act.

Weights and Measures Act 1985 (c. 72)

An Act to consolidate certain enactments relating to weights and measures.
The act defines the four primary units of measurement as the metre or the yard (defined in terms of the metre) for length, and the kilogram or pound (defined in terms of the kilogram) for mass. The act also requires standard physical examples to be maintained (known as "United Kingdom primary standards") for each of the four primary units.
In addition, the definitions of units which are multiples or sub-multiples of the primary units are defined, in terms of the primary units, and given as: mile, foot, inch, kilometre, decimetre, centimetre, millimetre, acre, square yard, square foot, hectare, decare, are, square metre, square decimetre, square centimetre, square millimetre, cubic metre, cubic decimetre, cubic centimetre, hectolitre, litre, decilitre, centilitre, millilitre, gallon, quart, pint, gill, fluid ounce, pound, ounce, ounce troy, tonne, kilogram, hectogram, gram, carat (metric) and milligram.
As originally enacted, the act also defined, in the same way, units which could not be used for trade as: furlong, chain, square mile, rood, square inch, cubic yard, cubic foot, cubic inch, bushel, peck, fluid drachm, minim, ton, hundredweight, cental, quarter, stone, dram, grain, pennyweight, ounce apothecaries, drachm, scruple, metric ton and quintal.
As of January 2020, following multiple amendments over the years since enactment, the metre, yard, kilogram and pound remain as the primary defined units and with the requirement to maintain the "United Kingdom primary standards" for them.
At the same time, all the imperial units, except pint and ounce troy (but including all of those which were originally defined as not to be used for trade) were reclassified as being available for use for trade as supplementary indications, namely: mile, furlong, chain, yard, foot, inch, square mile, acre, rood, square yard, square foot, square inch, cubic yard, cubic foot, cubic inch, bushel, peck, gallon, quart, gill, fluid ounce, fluid drachm, minim, ton, hundredweight, cental, quarter, stone, pound, ounce, dram, grain, pennyweight, ounce apothecaries, drachm, scruple and quintal. The tonne was also reclassified as being available for use for trade as a supplementary unit of measure,

== Northern Ireland ==
Weights and Measures Act (Northern Ireland) 1967
- Act of Parliament
- Parliament of Northern Ireland
- Long title: An Act to make amended provision with respect to weights and measures and for connected purposes.
- Citation: 1967 c. 6 (N.I.)
- Territorial extent: Northern Ireland

Dates
- Royal assent: 25 April 1967
Other legislation
Amended by	Weights and Measures (Northern Ireland) Order 1981

Status: Amended

Revised text of statute as amended

- Weights and Measures Act (Northern Ireland) 1967 (c. 6 (N.I.))

Weights and Measures (Northern Ireland) Order 1981
- Statutory Instrument
- Parliament of the United Kingdom
- Citation: SI 1981/231
- Territorial extent: Northern Ireland

Dates
- Made: 18 February 1981
- Commencement: 18 March 1981
Other legislation
Made under	Northern Ireland Act 1974
Amended by	Weights and Measures (Amendment) Act (Northern Ireland) 2000

Status: Amended

Text of the Weights and Measures (Northern Ireland) Order 1981 as in force today (including any amendments) within the United Kingdom, from legislation.gov.uk.

- Weights and Measures (Northern Ireland) Order 1981 (SI 1981/231)

Weights and Measures (Amendment) Act (Northern Ireland) 2000
- Act of the Northern Ireland Assembly
- Northern Ireland Assembly
- Long title: An Act to amend the Weights and Measures (Northern Ireland) Order 1981 to allow self-verification of weighing or measuring equipment, testing by official EEA testers and pre-test stamping.
- Citation: 2000 c. 5 (N.I.)
- Territorial extent: Northern Ireland

Dates
- Royal assent: 20 December 2000

Status: Current legislation

History of passage through the Assembly

Text of statute as originally enacted

Text of the Weights and Measures (Amendment) Act (Northern Ireland) 2000 as in force today (including any amendments) within the United Kingdom, from legislation.gov.uk.

- Weights and Measures (Amendment) Act (Northern Ireland) 2000 (c. 5 (N.I.))

== See also ==
- Other weights and measures acts
