= List of acts of the Northern Ireland Assembly from 2000 =

This is a list of acts of the Northern Ireland Assembly passed in 2000. Acts of the Northern Ireland Assembly are enacted by the Northern Ireland Assembly, which has legislative authority over devolved matters in relation to Northern Ireland under the authority of the Northern Ireland Act 1998. Acts are cited by calendar year, in the same fashion as acts of Parliament of the United Kingdom. Each act passed in a respective year is given a chapter number (abbreviated "c.") denoted by Arabic numerals, and citations are usually followed by the suffix "(N.I.)" so as to prevent confusion with acts of Parliament of the United Kingdom.

5 acts of the Northern Ireland Assembly were passed in 2000.

indicates that an act has been transcribed on Wikisource, indicates that an act is available to view at legislation.gov.uk, and indicates the location of the original act in the Parliamentary Archives.

== Acts of the Northern Ireland Assembly ==
Short title	Citation	Royal assent
Long title
Financial Assistance for Political Parties Act (Northern Ireland) 2000	2000 c. 1 (N.I.)	10 February 2000
An Act to provide for the making of payments to political parties for the purpose of assisting members of the Northern Ireland Assembly who are connected with such parties to perform their Assembly duties.
Appropriation Act (Northern Ireland) 2000	2000 c. 2 (N.I.)	25 July 2000
An Act to authorise the issue out of the Consolidated Fund of certain sums for the service of the year ending on 31st March 2001; to appropriate those sums for specified purposes and authorise other sums to be applied as appropriations in aid for those purposes; to authorise the Department of Finance and Personnel to borrow on the credit of the appropriated sums; and to repeal certain Appropriation Orders.
Allowances to Members of the Assembly Act (Northern Ireland) 2000 (repealed)	2000 c. 3 (N.I.)	25 July 2000
An Act to make provision for the payment of allowances to or in respect of persons who have been members of the Northern Ireland Assembly. (Repealed by Allowances to Members of the Assembly (Repeal) Act (Northern Ireland) 2011 (c. 8 (N.I.)))
Child Support, Pensions and Social Security Act (Northern Ireland) 2000	2000 c. 4 (N.I.)	20 November 2000
An Act to amend the law relating to child support; to amend the law relating to occupational and personal pensions; to amend the law relating to social security benefits and social security administration; to amend Part III of the Family Law Reform (Northern Ireland) Order 1977 (Note: Family Law Reform (Northern Ireland) Order 1977 (SI 1977/1250)) and Part V of the Matrimonial and Family Proceedings (Northern Ireland) Order 1989; (Note: Matrimonial and Family Proceedings (Northern Ireland) Order 1989 (SI 1989/677)) and for connected purposes.
Weights and Measures (Amendment) Act (Northern Ireland) 2000	2000 c. 5 (N.I.)	20 December 2000
An Act to amend the Weights and Measures (Northern Ireland) Order 1981 (Note: Weights and Measures (Northern Ireland) Order 1981 (SI 1981/231)) to allow self-verification of weighing or measuring equipment, testing by official EEA testers and pre-test stamping.
