= Auncel =

The auncel (Norman: auncelle or aunsell’, lit. "little balance") was a steelyard balance scale formerly used in England. It consisted of a rod with the fulcrum near one end and a weight that could be moved along the graduated longer arm. The item to be weighed was hung from the end of the shorter arm of the rod. This design made it easier for merchants to falsify the weight than when scales with arms of equal length were used, as a result of which it was banned by Edward III in 1350. (Note: 25 Edward III st. 5 c. 9 (1350).)

In some British dialects, it is used for the informal weighing of meat by hand instead of by scales.
