= Composing stick =

Tool used in printing to assemble metal type into words and lines

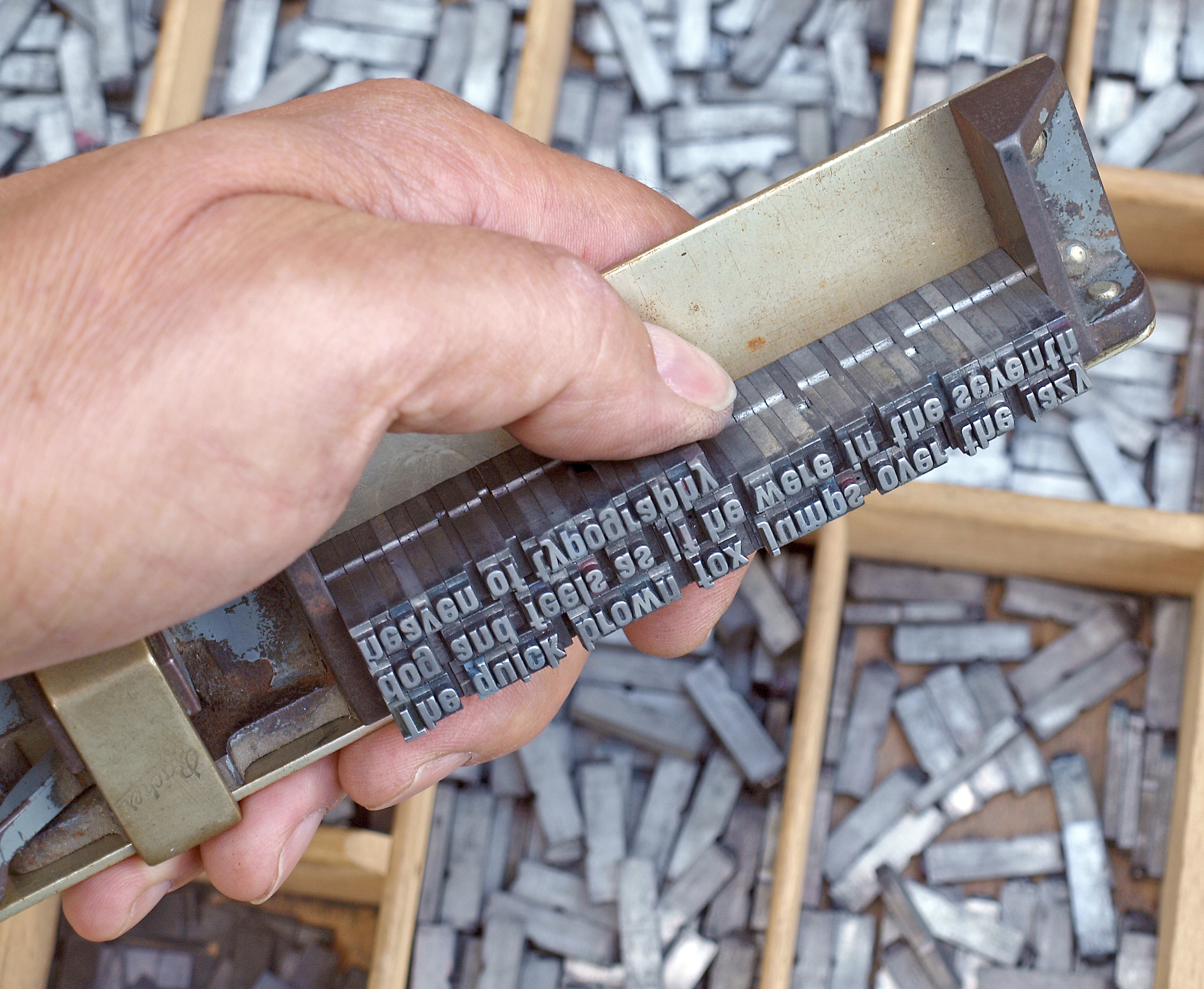
A composing stick loaded with metal movable type, held over a lower case with larger boxes for more common minuscule letters: the upper case holds capital letters.

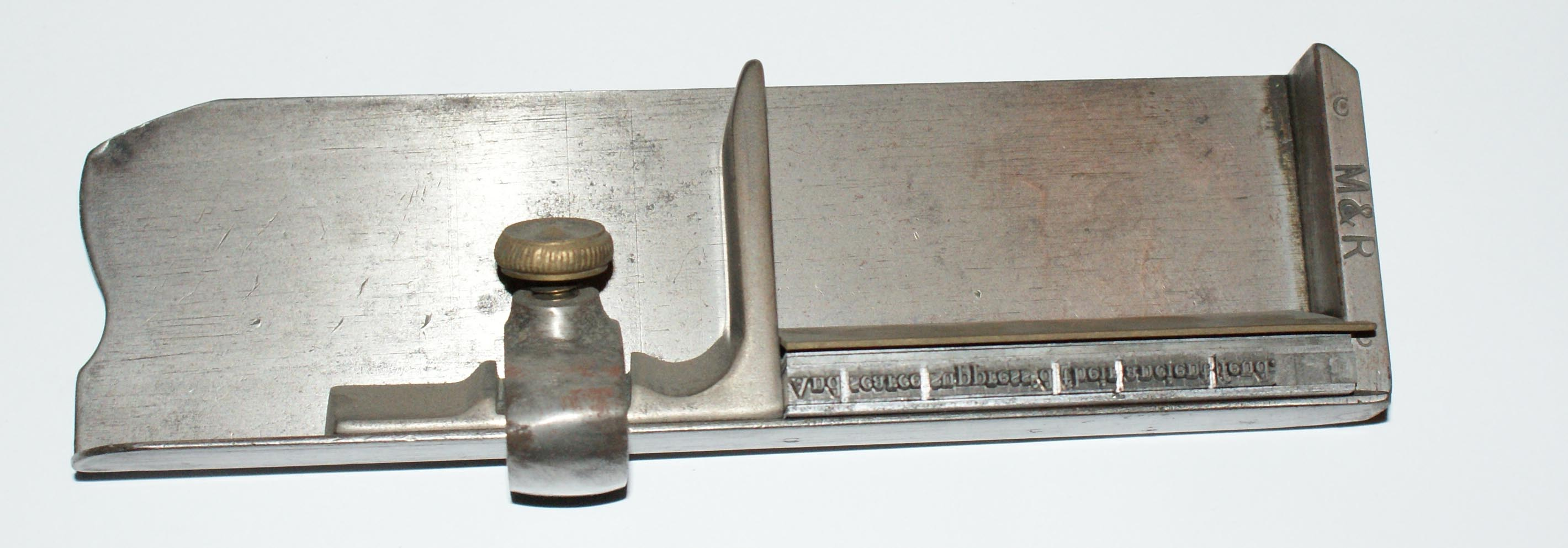
A Miller & Richard composing stick, showing the adjustment mechanism (left side)

In letterpress printing and typesetting, a composing stick is a tray-like tool used to assemble pieces of metal type into words and lines, which are then transferred to a galley before being locked into a forme and printed. Many composing sticks have one adjustable end, allowing the length of the lines and consequent width of the page or column to be set, with spaces and quadrats of different sizes being used to make up the exact width. Early composing sticks often had a fixed measure, as did many used in setting type for newspapers, which were fixed to the width of a standard column, when newspapers were still composed by hand.

The compositor takes the pieces of type from the boxes (compartments) of the type case and places them in the composing stick, working from left to right and placing the letters upside-down with the nick to the top.

Early composing sticks were made of wood, but later iron, brass, steel, aluminium, pewter and other metals were used. Wooden composing sticks continued to be made in large sizes into the nineteenth century, for setting wood letter and other large sizes of type for display. In the industrial age, composing sticks were manufactured by many companies, but notably in America by the H. B. Rouse company, which made composing sticks that were adjustable to the half pica, as well as a stick containing a micrometer screw that was infinitely adjustable. Some sticks were marked in agates as well, to aid in newspaper and advertisement composition.

== See also ==
- Galley proof – Initial printing of a work for review
- Stick (unit) – An inexact unit of typesetting length based on the composing stick
