= Standards of Weights, Measures, and Coinage Act 1866 =

Act of the Parliament of the United Kingdom

Standards of Weights, Measures, and Coinage Act 1866 (Note: Section 16.)
- Act of Parliament
- Parliament of the United Kingdom
- Long title: An Act to amend the Acts relating to the Standard Weights and Measures and to the Standard Trial Pieces of the Coin of the Realm.
- Citation: 29 & 30 Vict. c. 82
- Territorial extent: United Kingdom

Dates
- Royal assent: 6 August 1866
- Commencement: 6 August 1866 (Note: The Acts of Parliament (Commencement) Act 1793.)
- Repealed: 1 January 1879
Other legislation
Amends	Weights and Measures Act 1824; Office of Receipt of Exchequer Act 1834; Weights and Measures Act 1835; Weights and Measures Act 1855; Sale of Gas Act 1859
Amended by	Statute Law Revision Act 1875
Repealed by	Weights and Measures Act 1878

Status: Repealed

Text of statute as originally enacted

The Standards of Weights, Measures, and Coinage Act 1866 (29 & 30 Vict. c. 82) was an act of the Parliament of the United Kingdom.

== Provisions ==
The act created a department of the Board of Trade called the Standard Weights and Measures Department. This department was responsible for maintaining the weights and measures used in the country – in particular, the primary and secondary standards, the physical "master" weights and lengths that other measuring devices could be compared against. These had previously been the responsibility of the Exchequer.

=== Repealed enactments ===
Section 14 of the act repealed 5 enactments, listed in the schedule to the act.

Citation	Short title	Description	Extent of repeal
5 Geo. 4. c. 74	Weights and Measures Act 1824	An Act for ascertaining and establishing Uniformity of Weights and Measure.	So much of Section Twelve as relates to Fees.
4 & 5 Will. 4. c. 15	Office of Receipt of Exchequer Act 1834	An Act to regulate the Office of the Receipt of His Majesty's Exchequer at Westminster.	Section Seven.
5 & 6 Will. 4. c. 63	Weights and Measures Act 1835	An Act to repeal an Act of the Fourth and Fifth Year of His present Majesty, relating to Weights and Measures, and to make other Provisions instead thereof.	So much of Section Five as relates to Fees.
18 & 19 Vict. c. 72	Weights and Measures Act 1855	An Act for legalizing and preserving the restored Standards of Weights and Measure.	Section Six.
22 & 23 Vict. c. 66	Sale of Gas Act 1859	An Act for regulating Measures used in Sales of Gas.	So much of Section Six as relates to Fees.

== Subsequent developments ==
The whole act was repealed by section 86 of the Weights and Measures Act 1878 (41 & 42 Vict. c. 49), which came into force on 1 January 1879.

== Bibliography ==
- Taylor, A. J. (1991) [1965]. The Jewel Tower: Westminster (2nd ed.). London, UK: English Heritage. ISBN 9781850743637.
- Turner, Gerald L'E. (1983). Nineteenth-Century Scientific Instruments. Berkeley, US and Los Angeles, US: University of California Press. ISBN 9780520051607.
