= Seam (unit) =

A seam is an obsolete unit of volume or mass in the United Kingdom

The Oxford English Dictionary includes definitions of a seam as:

- 6–8 imperial pecks (55–73 L) of sand
- 9 imperial pecks (82 L) of apples
- 8 imperial bushels (290 L) of grain
- 120 pounds (54 kg) of glass (or 100 pounds (45 kg) in the 14th century)
- a cart-load, sometimes of a specified amount such as 2 hundredweight (100 kg) of straw or 3 hundredweight (150 kg) of hay or manure.

Cardarelli asserts that it was equal to 64 imperial gallons (290 L).
