= Stick (unit) =

Unit of measurement

The stick may refer to several separate units, depending on the item being measured.

== Length ==
In typography, the stick, stickful, or stick of type was an inexact length based on the size of the various composing sticks used by newspaper editors to assemble pieces of moveable type. In English-language papers, it was roughly equal to 2 column inches or 100–150 words. In France, Spain, and Italy, sticks generally contained only between 1 and 4 lines of text each. A column was notionally equal to 10 sticks.

== Mass ==
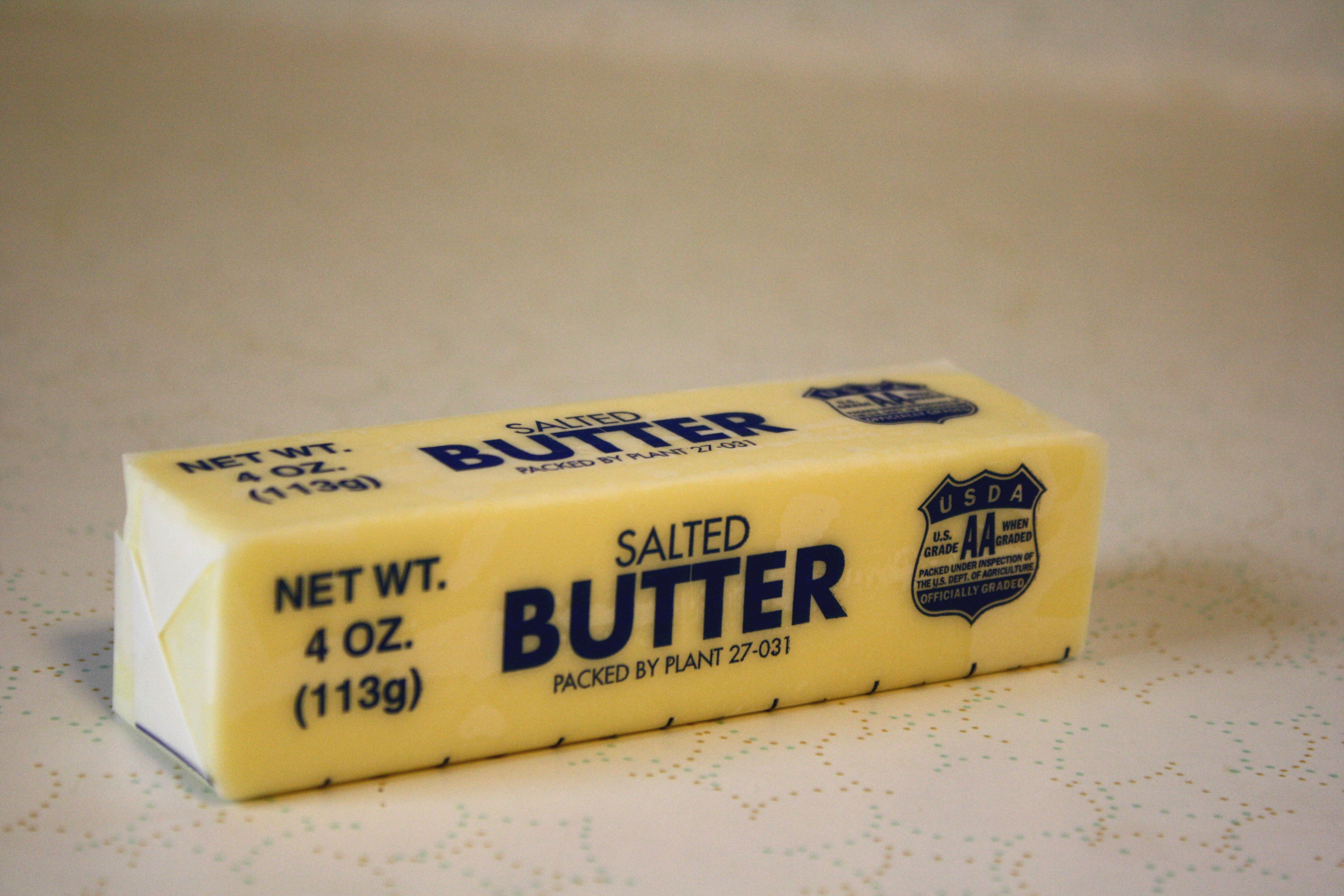
A stick of butter

In American cooking, a stick of butter is taken to be 4 ounces (about 113 g).

== Volume ==
In American cooking, a stick of butter may also be understood as ½ cup or 8 tablespoons (about 118 mL).

== See also ==
- English, imperial, and US customary units
- Traditional point-size names
