= Grigory Sverdlin =

Russian anti-war activist

- Григорий Свердлин
- Born: Saint Petersburg, Russia
- Education: Moscow State University
- Years active: 1994–present
- Known for: Former director of Nochlezhka; Founder of Get Lost
- Movement: Anti-war

Grigory Sverdlin (Russian: Григорий Свердлин) is a Russian anti-war activist who, prior to fleeing Russia, was the director of the homeless charity Nochlezhka that operates in Moscow and Saint Petersburg. He fled to Tbilisi, Georgia, which is where he founded Get Lost, an organisation providing aid to Russian citizens wanting to evade conscription and Russian soldiers who want to desert or surrender to Ukraine.

In late 2023, Sverdlin was placed on a wanted list and declared a foreign agent by the Russian government.

== Life and Nochlezhka ==
Nochlezhka Charitable Organisation (Russian: Благотворительная организация «Ночле́жка», romanized: Blagatvorityelnaya organizatsiya Nochlezhka) began in 1993 as a non-governmental organisation (NGO) publishing the newspaper The Depths (Russian: На Дне, romanized: Na Dne), a street newspaper. The newspaper was intentionally modelled on The Big Issue, a street newspaper that began in the UK in 1991. The first issue was published in September 1994, with the main task of the newspaper being to provide the homeless with a chance to earn a wage while also changing the attitude of the public towards the homeless.

Sverdlin joined Nochlezhka as a volunteer some time around 2002, with the newspaper being renamed to The Way Home (Russian: Путь Домой, romanized: Put Domoi) the following year. As a volunteer, he distributed food to the homeless, saying that he had "an abstract desire to help someone, someone whom society tries not to think about." In 2003 he graduated from the Moscow State University Faculty of Economics and quit his job at a bank, becoming a coordinator at Nochlezhka. He became an employee at Nochlezhka in 2010 and by 2011 he was the director of the organisation.

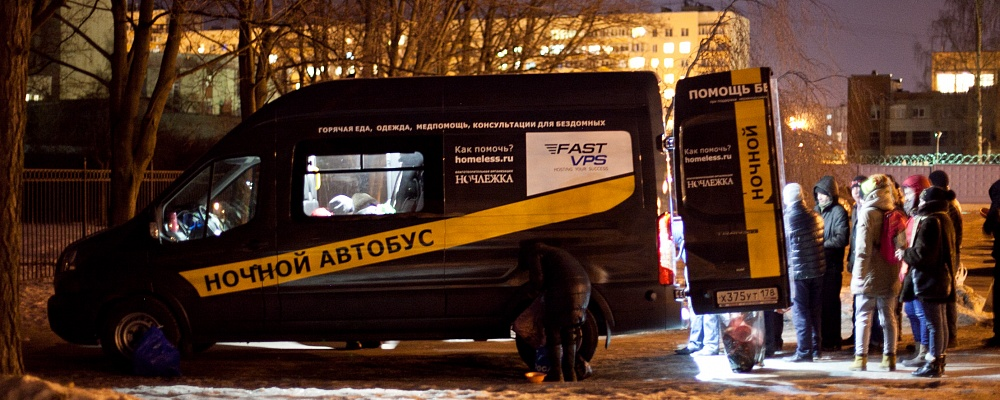
Distribution of food from a Night Bus

As the director of Nochlezhka, Sverdlin tried to work once a month at a reception for the homeless and ride on a "night bus" alongside volunteers. The night bus is a van that goes out into the city every evening, making several stops to distribute food to the homeless.

== Russian invasion of Ukraine and exile ==
Since the beginning of the Russian invasion of Ukraine, Sverdlin participated in the anti-war movement. Sverdlin said that his friends were "horrified" that he openly wore a jacket with "No War" written on the back. He also had a sticker saying "Freedom for Political Prisoners" on the rear window of his car. This sticker resulted in his car being towed, with him saying "Yes, once the valiant traffic police and Center "E" seized my car for five weeks - to check if it was stolen. At the same time, the policeman shyly looked away: “Well, you understand everything.” But otherwise - not a single incident." He also said that several times a day, this sticker gained him several thumbs-up from both passing drivers and pedestrians, alongside "four very touching notes under the [windscreen] wiper".

On 4 March 2022, a group of federal laws established administrative and criminal punishments for those found to be "discrediting" or disseminating "unreliable information" about the Russian Armed Forces; something Sverdlin compared to the works of Daniil Kharms, Jaroslav Hašek and George Orwell. He said of the law "there has been no freedom of assembly for a long time, but since then there has been no freedom of speech."

At some point between 4 March and 14 March 2022, Sverdlin was warned that he was "on the list" and that criminal proceedings against him may soon be initiated, something he expected; "After all, I was standing in a solitary picket almost every day." He also said that he wasn't ready to "put up with this situation," and that he would continue to rally "until the war is over or until I end up in prison." He was forced to flee Russia, saying "I threw a couple of rucksacks and a folding bike in the car and left the country." When he went to say goodbye to his parents, he found them getting ready to have their house searched. Upon fleeing Russia, he held a Zoom meeting with his staff to inform them that he was resigning as the director of Nochlezhka, stating that he didn't want to attract unwanted attention to the organisation by remaining as its director.

Sverdlin speaking to Radio Free Europe/Radio Liberty in 2022

Yes, I plan to stay in Vilnius for a week, and then I will go by car to Tbilisi. 5,500 kilometres is just the right distance to clear my head. I will drive through Poland, Slovakia, Hungary, Romania (or Serbia), Bulgaria and Turkey. I've already put a call out on social networks in case anyone wants to meet on the way. In 24 hours everything was decided and organised.

Sverdlin spent his first few days after fleeing in Tallinn, Estonia, where he helped others to flee by arranging for them to have seats on flights chartered by tech executives. By 14 March 2022, he was in Vilnius, Lithuania, saying to Radio Free Europe/Radio Liberty that he planned to stay there for that week, then travel to Tbilisi, Georgia by car. Georgia is where he said many of his friends had fled to.

== Get Lost ==
Sverdlin speaking to Current Time TV in 2022

...the core of the team was formed quickly, we found the money to start, then volunteers began to join us with great speed: I’ve been in charity for almost 20 years, but I’ve never seen a project have a hundred volunteers in the morning, and 350 in the evening.

Around 24–25 September 2022, not long after the announcement of a partial mobilisation of reservists in Russia on 21 September, Sverdlin conceptualised the organisation Go by the Forest (Russian: Идите Лесом, romanized: Idite Lesom), which would later be known as Get Lost. On 26 September the organisation was announced, and by early October it was operational. Sverdlin expressed surprise at how quickly the organisation expanded after its founding.

The organisation helps both Russian citizens to escape conscription and Russian soldiers to desert and flee the country or surrender to Ukraine, while also providing legal, financial and psychological aid to those who need it. To facilitate the safe surrender of Russian soldiers to Ukraine, the organisation maintains contact with their Ukrainian equivalent, I Want to Live, a government sponsored organisation that operates a hotline for Russian soldiers wanting to surrender.

Sverdlin said that three days after the organisation was founded, volunteers had received over 1,000 inquiries, including questions about both legally and illegally crossing the border, requests for psychological support and questions about how to safely surrender to Ukraine.
