= Pound (mass) =

Unit of mass

pound
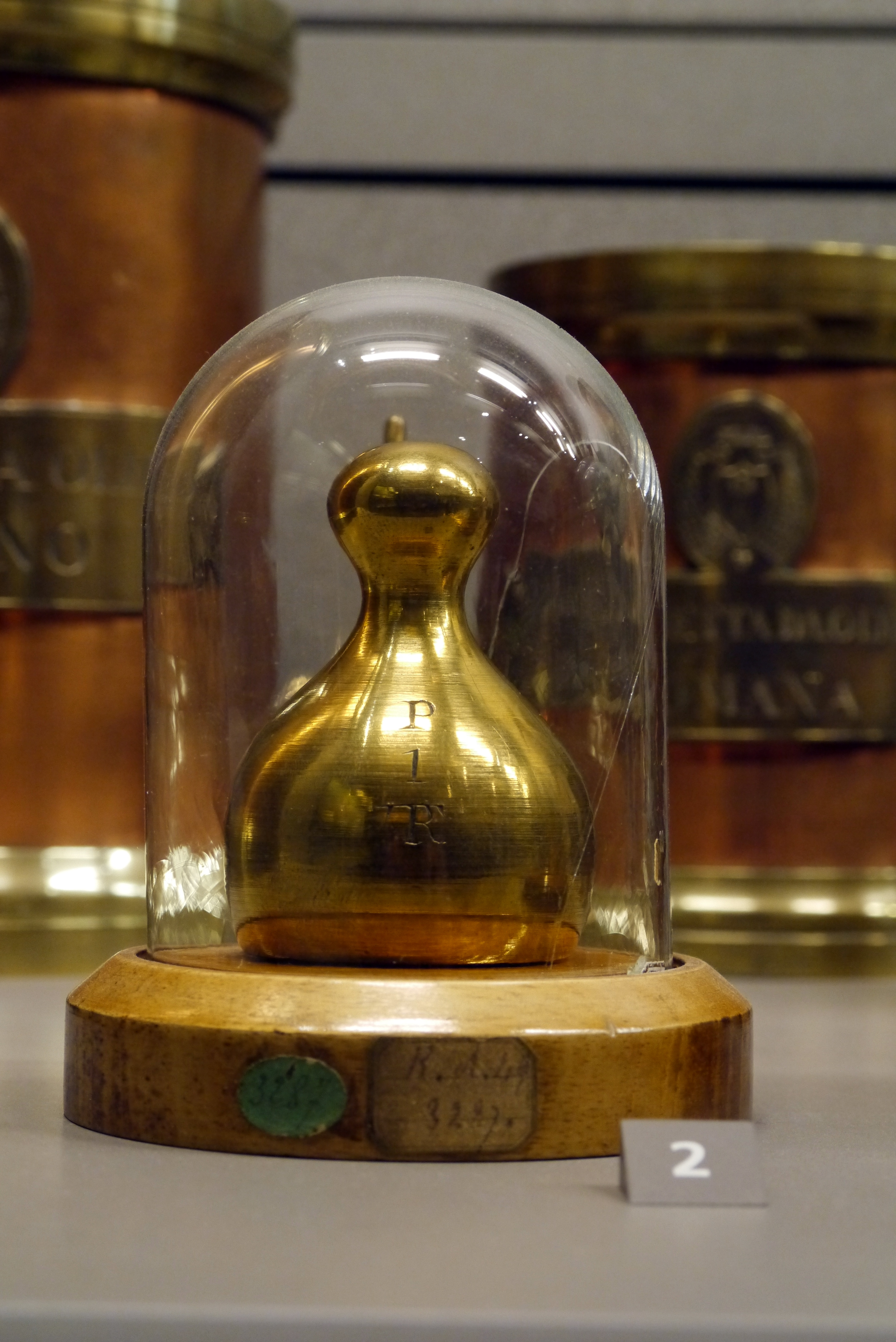
- One-pound avoirdupois weight, from the Musée des Arts et Métiers

General information
- Unit system: British imperial units, United States customary units
- Unit of: mass
- Symbol: lb

Conversions
1 lb in ...	... is equal to ...
- SI units: 0.45359237 kg
- Avoirdupois: 16 ounces

The pound or pound-mass is a unit of mass used in both the British imperial and United States customary systems of measurement. Various definitions have been used; the most common today is the international avoirdupois pound, which is legally defined as exactly 0.45359237 kilograms, and which is divided into 16 avoirdupois ounces. The international standard symbol for the avoirdupois pound is lb; an alternative symbol (when there might otherwise be a risk of confusion with the pound-force) is lb_{m} (for most pound definitions), # (chiefly in the US), and ℔ or ″̶ (specifically for the apothecaries' pound).

The unit is descended from the Roman libra (hence the symbol lb, descended from the scribal abbreviation, ℔). The English word pound comes from the Roman libra pondo ('the weight measured in libra'), and is cognate with, among others, German Pfund, Dutch pond, and Swedish pund. These units remain in common use in many territories especially those which have not fully adopted the metric system.

Usage of the unqualified term pound reflects the historical conflation of mass and weight. This accounts for the modern distinguishing terms pound-mass and pound-force.

== Etymology ==
The word 'pound' and its cognates ultimately derive from a borrowing into Proto-Germanic of the Latin expression libra pondo ('the weight measured in libra'), in which the word pondo is the ablative singular of the Latin noun pondus ('weight').

== Current use ==
The United States and the Commonwealth of Nations agreed upon common definitions for the pound and the yard. Since 1 July 1959, the international avoirdupois pound (symbol lb) has been defined as exactly 0.45359237 kg. The United Kingdom transposed the agreement into UK law with the Weights and Measures Act 1963.

An avoirdupois pound is equal to 16 avoirdupois ounces and to exactly 7,000 grains. The conversion factor between the kilogram and the international pound was therefore chosen to be divisible by 7 with a terminating decimal representation, and an (international) grain is thus equal to exactly 64.79891 milligrams.

In the United Kingdom, the process of metrication and European units of measurement directives were expected to eliminate the use of the pound and ounce, but in 2007 the European Commission abandoned the requirement for metric-only labelling on packaged goods there, and allowed for dual metric–imperial marking to continue indefinitely.

In the United States, the Metric Conversion Act of 1975 declared the metric system to be the "preferred system of weights and measures" but did not suspend use of United States customary units. The United States is the only industrialised country where commercial activities do not predominantly use the metric system, despite many efforts to do so, and the pound remains widely used as one of the key customary units.

== Historical use ==
Historically, in different parts of the world, at different points in time, and for different applications, the pound (or its translation) has referred to broadly similar but not identical standards of mass or force. (Note: The pound is often described as a unit of "weight", and the word "weight" can refer to either mass or force depending on context. Historically and in common parlance, "weight" refers to mass, but weight as used in modern physics is a force.)

Comparison of the relative sizes of avoirdupois, troy, Tower, merchant and London pounds
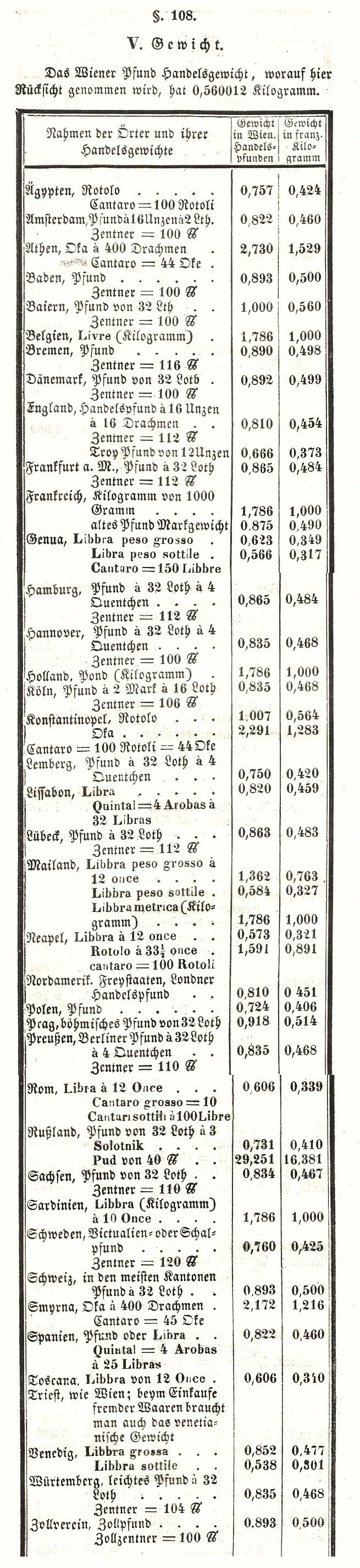
Various historic pounds from a German textbook dated 1848

=== Roman libra ===
The libra (Latin for 'scale'/'balance') is an ancient Roman unit of mass that is now equivalent to 328.9 g (11.60 oz). It was divided into 12 unciae (singular: uncia), or ounces. The libra is the origin of the abbreviation for pound, "lb".

=== In Britain ===
A number of different definitions of the pound have historically been used in Britain. Among these are the avoirdupois pound, which is the common pound used for weights, and the obsolete tower, merchants' and London pounds. The troy pound and ounce remain in use only for the weight of precious metals, especially in their trade. The weights of traded precious metals, such as gold and silver, are normally quoted just in ounces (e.g. "500 ounces") and, when the type of ounce is not explicitly stated, the troy system is assumed.

The pound sterling money system, which was introduced during the reign of King Offa of Mercia (757–96), was based originally on a Saxon pound of silver. After the Norman conquest the Saxon pound was known as the tower pound or moneyer's pound. In 1528, during the reign of Henry VIII, the coinage standard was changed by parliament from the tower pound to the troy pound.

==== Avoirdupois pound ====
The avoirdupois pound, also known as the wool pound, first came into general use c. 1300. It was initially equal to 6,992 troy grains. The pound avoirdupois was divided into 16 ounces. During the reign of Queen Elizabeth I, the avoirdupois pound was redefined as 7,000 troy grains. Since then, the grain has often been an integral part of the avoirdupois system. By 1758, two Elizabethan Exchequer standard weights for the avoirdupois pound existed, and when measured in troy grains they were found to be of 7,002 grains and 6,999 grains. (Note: A difference of just 194.39673 milligrams)

===== Imperial standard pound =====
In the United Kingdom, weights and measures have been defined by a long series of Acts of Parliament, the intention of which has been to regulate the sale of commodities. Materials traded in the marketplace are quantified according to accepted units and standards in order to avoid fraud. The standards themselves are legally defined so as to facilitate the resolution of disputes brought to the courts; only legally defined measures will be recognised by the courts. Quantifying devices used by traders (weights, weighing machines, containers of volumes, measures of length) are subject to official inspection, and penalties apply if they are fraudulent.

The Weights and Measures Act 1878 (41 & 42 Vict. c. 49) marked a major overhaul of the British system of weights and measures, and the definition of the pound given there remained in force until the 1960s. The pound was defined thus (Section 4): "The ... platinum weight ... deposited in the Standards department of the Board of Trade ... shall continue to be the imperial standard of ... weight ... and the said platinum weight shall continue to be the imperial standard for determining the imperial standard pound for the United Kingdom". Section 13 states that the weight in vacuo of this standard shall be called the imperial standard pound, and that all other weights mentioned in the act and permissible for commerce shall be ascertained from it alone. The first schedule of the act gave more details of the standard pound: it is a platinum cylinder nearly 1.35 inches (34 mm) high, and 1.15 inches (29 mm) diameter, and the edges are carefully rounded off. It has a groove about 0.34 inches (8.6 mm) from the top, to allow the cylinder to be lifted using an ivory fork. It was constructed following the destruction of the Houses of Parliament by fire in 1834, and is stamped "P.S. 1844, 1 lb" (P.S. stands for "Parliamentary Standard").

English pounds
Unit	Pounds											Ounces						Grains		Metric	
Unit	Avdp.		Troy		Tower		Merchant		London		Metric	Avdp.		Troy		Tower		Troy	Tower	g	kg
Avoirdupois	1		175/144	= 1.21527̅	35/27	= 1.2̅9̅6̅	28/27	= 1.0̅3̅7̅	35/36	= 0.972̅	≈ 0.9072	16		14 7/12	= 14.583̅	15 5/9	= 15.5̅	7,000	9,955 5/9	≈ 454	≈ 5/11
Troy	144/175	≈ 0.8229	1		16/15	= 1.06̅	64/75	= 0.853̅	4/5	= 0.8	≈ 0.7465	13 29/175	≈ 13.17	12		12 4/5	= 12.8	5,760	8,192	≈ 373	≈ 3/8
Tower	27/35	≈ 0.7714	15/16	= 0.9375	1		4/5	= 0.8	3/4	= 0.75	≈ 0.6998	12 12/35	≈ 12.34	11 1/4	= 11.25	12		5,400	7,680	≈ 350	≈ 7/20
Merchant	27/28	≈ 0.9643	75/64	= 1.171875	5/4	= 1.25	1		15/16	= 0.9375	≈ 0.8748	15 3/7	≈ 15.43	14 1/16	= 14.0625	15		6,750	9,600	≈ 437	≈ 7/16
London	36/35	≈ 1.029	5/4	= 1.25	4/3	= 1.3̅	16/15	= 1.06̅	1		≈ 0.9331	16 16/35	≈ 16.46	15		16		7,200	10,240	≈ 467	≈ 7/15
Metric		≈ 1.1023		≈ 1.3396		≈ 1.4289		≈ 1.1431		≈ 1.0717	1		≈ 17.64		≈ 16.08		≈ 17.15	7,716	10,974	= 500	= 1/2

===== Redefinition in terms of the kilogram =====
The British Weights and Measures Act 1878 (41 & 42 Vict. c. 49) said that contracts worded in terms of metric units would be deemed by the courts to be made according to the Imperial units defined in the Act, and a table of metric equivalents was supplied so that the Imperial equivalents could be legally calculated. This defined, in UK law, metric units in terms of Imperial ones. The equivalence for the pound was given as 1 lb = 453.59265 g or 0.45359 kg, which made the kilogram equivalent to about 2.2046213 lb.

In 1883, it was determined jointly by the standards department of the British Board of Trade and the Bureau International that 0.4535924277 kg was a better approximation, and this figure, rounded to 0.45359243 kg was given legal status by an Order in Council in May 1898.

In 1959, based on further measurements and international coordination, the International Yard and Pound Agreement defined an "international pound" as being equivalent to exactly 0.45359237 kg. This meant that the existing legal definition of the UK pound differed from the international standard pound by 0.06 milligrams. To remedy this, the pound was again redefined in the United Kingdom by the Weights and Measures Act 1963 to match the international pound, stating: "the pound shall be 0.453 592 37 kilogramme exactly", a definition which remains valid to the present day.

The 2019 revision of the SI means that the Avoirdupois pound is now defined precisely in terms of fundamental constants, ending the era of its definition in terms of physical prototypes; by definition, it is 0.45359237 kg.

==== Troy pound ====
A troy pound (abbreviated lb t) is equal to 12 troy ounces and to 5,760 grains, which is exactly 373.2417216 grams. Troy weights were used in England by jewellers. Apothecaries also used the troy pound and ounce, but added the drachms and scruples unit in the apothecaries' system of weights.

Troy weight may take its name from the French market town of Troyes in France where English merchants traded at least as early as the early 9th century. The troy pound is no longer in general use or a legal unit for trade (it was abolished in the United Kingdom on 6 January 1879 by the Weights and Measures Act 1878), but the troy ounce, 1/12 of a troy pound, is still used for measurements of gems such as opals, and precious metals such as silver, platinum and particularly gold.

==== Tower pound ====
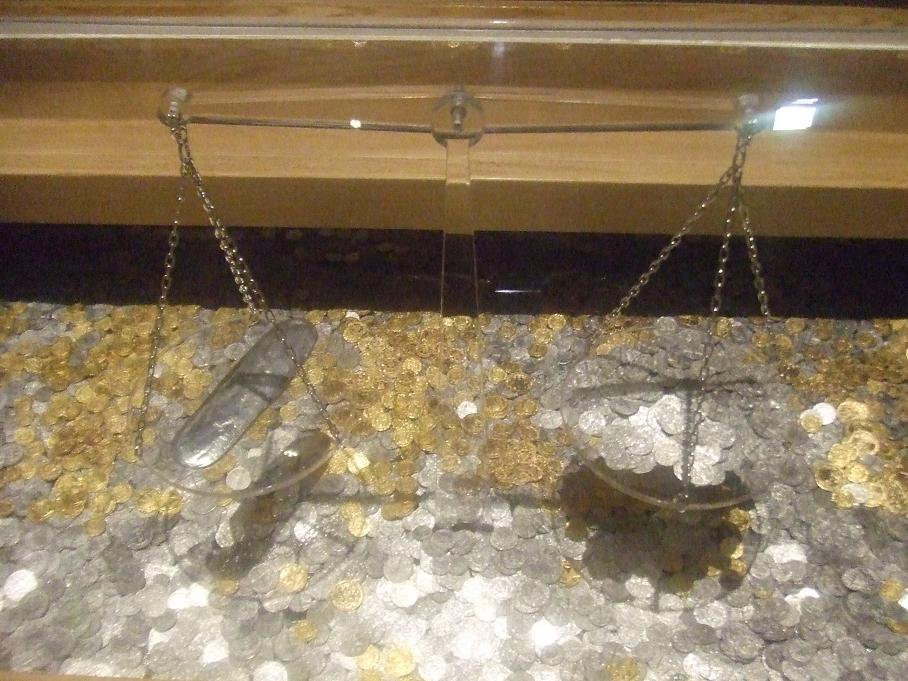
The tower pound displayed as the weight of a pound sterling of 240 early silver pennies (original pennyweight)

A tower pound is equal to 12 tower ounces and to 5,400 troy grains, which equals around 350 grams. The tower pound is the historical weight standard that was used for England's coinage. Before the Norman conquest in 1066, the tower pound was known as the Saxon pound. During the reign of King Offa (757–796) of Mercia, a Saxon pound of silver was used to set the original weight of a pound sterling. From one Saxon pound of silver (that is a tower pound) the king had 240 silver pennies minted. (Note: "Anglo-Saxon King Offa is credited with introducing the system of money to central and southern England in the latter half of the eighth century, overseeing the minting of the earliest English silver pennies – emblazoned with his name. In practice they varied considerably in weight and 240 of them seldom added up to a pound. There were at that time no larger denomination coins – pounds and shillings were merely useful units of account". – Ed Lowther, BBC) In the pound sterling monetary system, twelve pennies equalled a shilling and twenty shillings equalled a pound sterling.

The tower pound was referenced to a standard prototype found in the Tower of London. The tower system ran concurrently with the avoirdupois and troy systems until the reign of Henry VIII, when a royal proclamation dated 1526 required that the troy pound be used for mint purposes instead of the tower pound. No standards of the tower pound are known to have survived.

The tower pound was also called the moneyers' pound (referring to the Saxon moneyers before the Norman conquest); the easterling pound, which may refer to traders of eastern Germany, or to traders on the shore of the eastern Baltic sea, or dealers of Asiatic goods who settled at the London Steelyard wharf; and the Rochelle pound by French writers, because it was also in use at La Rochelle. An almost identical weight was employed by the Germans for weighing gold and silver.

The mercantile pound (1304) of 6750 troy grains, or 9600 Tower grains, derives from this pound, as 25 shilling-weights or 15 Tower ounces, for general commercial use. Multiple pounds based on the same ounce were quite common. In much of Europe, the apothecaries' and commercial pounds were different numbers of the same ounce.

1 mercantile pound (15 oz)	=	9,600 Tower grains	=	6,750 troy grains
1 Tower pound (12 oz)	=	7,680 Tower grains	=	5,400 troy grains
1 Tower ounce (20 dwt)	=	640 Tower grains	=	450 troy grains
1 Tower pennyweight (dwt)	=	32 Tower grains	=	22 1/2 troy grains

==== Merchants' pound ====
The merchants' pound (mercantile pound, libra mercantoria, or commercial pound) was considered to be composed of 25 rather than 20 Tower shillings of 12 pence. It was equal to 9,600 wheat grains (15 tower ounces or 6,750 grains) and was used in England until the 14th century for goods other than money and medicine ("electuaries").

==== London pound ====
The London pound is that of the Hansa, as used in their various trading places. The London pound is based on 16 ounces, each ounce divided as the tower ounce. It never became a legal standard in England; the use of this pound waxed and waned with the influence of the Hansa itself.

A London pound was equal to 7,200 troy grains (16 troy ounces) or, equivalently, 10,240 tower grains (16 tower ounces).

1 London pound (16 oz)	=	1 1/3 tower pounds (1.25 Troy pounds)	=	10,240 tower grains	=	7,200 troy grains
1 London ounce (20 dwt)	=	1 tower (or troy) ounce	=	640 tower grains	=	450 troy grains
1 London pennyweight	=	1 tower (or troy) pennyweight	=	32 tower grains	=	22 1/2 troy grains

=== In the United States ===
In the United States, the avoirdupois pound as a unit of mass has been officially defined in terms of the kilogram since the Mendenhall Order of 1893. That order defined the pound to be 2.20462 pounds to a kilogram. The following year, this relationship was refined as 2.20462234 pounds to a kilogram, following a determination of the British pound.

In 1959, the United States National Bureau of Standards redefined the pound (avoirdupois) to be exactly equal to 0.453 592 37 kilograms, as had been declared by the International Yard and Pound Agreement of that year. According to a 1959 NIST publication, the United States 1894 pound differed from the international pound by approximately one part in 10 million. The difference is so insignificant that it can be ignored for almost all practical purposes.

=== Byzantine litra ===
The Byzantines used a series of measurements known as pounds (Latin: libra, Ancient Greek: λίτρα, romanized: litra). The most common was the logarikē litra (λογαρική λίτρα, "pound of account"), established by Constantine the Great in 309/310. It formed the basis of the Byzantine monetary system, with one litra of gold equivalent to 72 solidi. A hundred litrai were known as a kentēnarion (κεντηνάριον, "hundredweight"). Its weight seems to have decreased gradually from the original 324 g (11.4 oz) to 319 g (11.3 oz). Due to its association with gold, it was also known as the chrysaphikē litra (χρυσαφική λίτρα, "gold pound") or thalassia litra (θαλάσσια λίτρα, "maritime pound"), but it could also be used as a measure of land, equalling a fortieth of the thalassios modios.

The soualia litra was specifically used for weighing olive oil or wood, and corresponded to 4/5 of the logarikē or 256 g (9.0 oz). Some outlying regions, especially in later times, adopted various local measures, based on Italian, Arab or Turkish measures. The most important of these was the argyrikē litra (αργυρική λίτρα, "silver pound") of 333 g (11.7 oz), found in Trebizond and Cyprus, and probably of Arab origin.

=== French livre ===
Since the Middle Ages, various pounds (livre) have been used in France. Since the 19th century, a livre has referred to the metric pound, 500 g.

The livre esterlin is equivalent to about 367.1 grams (5,665 gr) and was used between the late 9th century and the mid-14th century.

The livre poids de marc or livre de Paris is equivalent to about 489.5 grams (7,554 gr) and was used between the 1350s and the late 18th century. It was introduced by the government of John II.

The livre métrique was set equal to the kilogram by the decree of 13 Brumaire an IX between 1800 and 1812. This was a form of official metric pound.

The livre usuelle (customary unit) was defined as 500 g (18 oz) by the decree of 28 March 1812. It was abolished as a unit of mass effective 1 January 1840 by a decree of 4 July 1837, but is still used informally.

=== German and Austrian Pfund ===
Originally derived from the Roman libra, the definition varied throughout the Holy Roman Empire in the Middle Ages and onward. For example, the measures and weights of the Habsburg monarchy were reformed in 1761 by Empress Maria Theresa of Austria. The unusually heavy Habsburg (civil) pound of 16 ounces was later defined in terms of 560.012 g (19.7538 oz). Bavarian reforms in 1809 and 1811 adopted essentially the same standard as the Austrian pound. In Prussia, a reform in 1816 defined a uniform civil pound in terms of the Prussian foot and distilled water, resulting in a Prussian pound of 467.711 g (16.4980 oz).

Between 1803 and 1815, all German regions west of the River Rhine were under French control, organised in the departements: Roer, Sarre, Rhin-et-Moselle, and Mont-Tonnerre. As a result of the Congress of Vienna, these regions again became part of various German states. However, many of these regions retained the metric system and adopted a metric pound of precisely 500 g (17.64 oz). In 1854, the pound of 500 g also became the official mass standard of the German Customs Union and was renamed the Zollpfund, but local pounds continued to co-exist with the Zollverein pound for some time in some German states. Nowadays, the term Pfund is sometimes still in use and universally refers to a pound of 500 g.

=== Russian funt ===
The Russian pound (фунт, funt) is an obsolete Russian unit of measurement of mass. It is equal to 409.51718 g (14.445293 oz). In 1899, the funt was the basic unit of weight, and all other units of weight were formed from it; in particular, a zolotnik was 1/96 of a funt, and a pood was 40 funty.

=== Skålpund ===
The Skålpund was a Scandinavian measurement that varied in weight between regions. From the 17th century onward, it was equal to 425.076 g (14.9941 oz) in Sweden but was abandoned in 1889 when Sweden switched to the metric system.

In Norway, the same name was used for a weight of 425.076 g (14.9941 oz). In Denmark, it equalled 471 g (16.6 oz).

In the 19th century, Denmark followed Germany's lead and redefined the pound as 500 g (18 oz).

=== Portuguese libra and arrátel ===
The Portuguese unit that corresponds to the pounds of different nations is the arrátel, equivalent to 16 ounces of Colonha, a variant of the Cologne standard. This arrátel was introduced in 1499 by Manuel I, king of Portugal. Based on an evaluation of bronze nesting weight piles distributed by Manuel I to different towns, the arrátel of Manuel I has been estimated to be of 457.8 g (16.15 oz). In the early 19th century, the arrátel was evaluated at 459 g (16.2 oz).

In the 15th century, the arrátel was of 14 ounces of Colonha or 400.6 g (14.13 oz). The Portuguese libra was the same as 2 arráteis. There were also arráteis of 12.5 and 13 ounces and libras of 15 and 16 ounces. The Troyes or Tria standard was also used.

=== Jersey pound ===
A Jersey pound is an obsolete unit of mass used on the island of Jersey from the 14th century to the 19th century. It was equivalent to about 7,561 grains (490 g (17 oz)). It may have been derived from the French livre poids de marc.

=== Trone pound ===
The trone pound is one of a number of obsolete Scottish units of measurement. It was equivalent to between 21 and 28 avoirdupois ounces (about 600–800 g (21–28 oz)).

=== Metric pound ===
In many countries, upon the introduction of a metric system, the pound (or its translation) became an historic and obsolete term, although some have kept it as an informal term without a specific value. In German, the term is Pfund, in French livre, in Dutch pond, in Spanish and Portuguese libra, in Italian libbra, and in Danish and Swedish pund.

Though not from the same linguistic origin, the Chinese jīn (斤, also known as the "catty") in mainland China has a modern definition of exactly 500 g (18 oz), divided into 10 liǎng (两). Traditionally around 600 g (21 oz), the jin has been in use for more than two thousand years varying in exact value from one period to another, serving the same purpose as "pound" for the common-use measure of weight. In Hong Kong, for the purposes of commerce and trade between Britain and Imperial China in the preceding centuries, three Chinese catties were equivalent to four British imperial pounds, defining one catty as 604.78982 g (21.333333 oz) in weight precisely.

Hundreds of older pounds were replaced in this way. Examples of the older pounds are one of around 459–460 g (16.19–16.23 oz) in Spain, Portugal, and Latin America; one of 498.1 g (17.57 oz) in Norway; and several different ones in what is now Germany.

From the introduction of the kilogram scales and measuring devices are denominated only in grams and kilograms. A pound of product must be determined by weighing the product in grams as the use of the pound is not sanctioned for trade within the European Union.

== Use in weaponry ==
Smoothbore cannon and carronades are currently designated by the weight in imperial pounds of round solid iron shot of diameter to fit the barrel. A cannon that fires a six-pound ball, for example, is called a six-pounder. Standard sizes are 6, 12, 18, 24, 32, and 42 pounds; 60-pounders and 68-pounders also exist, along with other nonstandard weapons using the same scheme. Before the introduction of the metric system, countries that produced their own artillery generally used their national pound for these designations. See carronade.

A similar definition, using lead balls, exists for determining the gauge of shotguns and shotgun shells.

== See also ==
- Pound-force
- Slug (unit)
