= Get Lost (organisation) =

Charity helping Russians to evade conscription

- Идите Лесом
- Logo of Get Lost
- Formation: September–October 2022
- Founder: Grigory Sverdlin
- Founded at: Tbilisi, Georgia
- Headquarters: Tbilisi, Georgia
- Leader: Grigory Sverdlin
- Key people: Grigory Sverdlin; Darya Berg; Anton Gorbatsevich; Ivan Chuviliayev
- Affiliations: I Want to Live
- Website: English - https://iditelesom.org/en/ Russian - https://iditelesom.org/ru

Get Lost, previously Go by the Forest (Russian: Идите Лесом, romanized: Idite Lesom), is an anti-war charity founded by Grigory Sverdlin in Tbilisi, Georgia shortly after the announcement of a partial mobilisation of reservists in Russia on 21 September 2022.

By July 2025, Get Lost said it had advised over 48,000 people on how to avoid conscription and helped over 2,000 people to desert.

== Support offered by Get Lost ==
The organisation helps both Russian citizens to escape conscription and Russian soldiers to desert and flee the country or surrender to Ukraine, while also providing legal, financial and psychological aid to those who need it.

For those who are unable to leave or wish to remain in Russia, the organisation provides financial support and help with finding shelter. Additionally, there are those within Russia who offer "an empty country house or several empty places in a hostel" to shelter those "hiding from mobilization."

A volunteer with the organisation, Olesya, stated that it's more difficult to help those "who are already in units, at training camps, and some are already being sent to the front", as sometimes – despite being informed of their options – they still decide to fight in Ukraine.

Sverdlin speaking to The Washington Post in 2023

"We have dozens of routes across the borders and we instruct people and help them all the way," Sverdlin said. "We even have volunteers on the ground who help these people to cross the forest or cross the river or drive through different kinds of terrain."

Speaking on illegal crossings of the border, Sverdlin said "I learned that it’s a rather well-established business in Russia. From what I understand, before the war it was simpler and cheaper to cross illegally. In border towns, there are taxi drivers willing to take people through unguarded roads, into Kazakhstan, Mongolia or Belarus."

According to Sverdlin, all of the "illegal stuff" is handled by a team within the organisation known as the "Foresters", a small number of people who "have known each other personally and for a long time."

Sverdlin has also stated that the organisation does not help those sent to prison for violent crimes and later recruited into the Storm-Z units and those who have been involved in war crimes, however also said "we are not investigative agencies, we reason pragmatically – even if he managed to shoot three times, let him not shoot the fourth, and then there will be someone to investigate war crimes."

=== Process ===
To facilitate the safe surrender of Russian soldiers to Ukraine, the organisation maintains contact with their Ukrainian equivalent, I Want to Live, a government sponsored organisation that operates a hotline for Russian soldiers wanting to surrender.

Get Lost operates almost entirely online, using a Telegram bot which allows individuals to contact the organisation anonymously.

== History ==
Around 24–25 September 2022, not long after the announcement of a partial mobilisation of reservists in Russia on 21 September, Sverdlin conceptualised the organisation as "Go by the Forest". On 26 September the organisation was announced, and by early October it was running. A play on words, the organisation's name references the "covert nature of its work" while also resembling a tongue-in-cheek remark similar to the Russian for "Get Lost". The name has also been variously translated to "Go to Hell" and "Take a Hike" by media sources. The ultimate goal of the organisation is "to help as many people as possible to avoid being involved in the bloody Russian war in Ukraine" and to "weaken the strength of Putin's army".

Sverdlin speaking to Current Time TV in 2022

"...the core of the team was formed quickly, we found the money to start, then volunteers began to join us with great speed: I’ve been in charity for almost 20 years, but I’ve never seen a project have a hundred volunteers in the morning, and 350 in the evening."

While the organisation was preparing to launch, they consulted with several other organisations, including activists from Belarus "who had gained experience in evacuations after the 2020 protests." Speaking in 2024, Ivan Chuviliayev, Get Lost's Public Relations manager, said the initial idea behind the organisation was to "launch a kind of a hotline service to help those who wanted to avoid conscription," however they soon "realised that people needed much more from us, many reaching out for our help were primarily those who were already on the frontline. So we started working with deserters."

The organisation's core team is made up of six anti-war Russians, with those listed on its website being Sverdlin, Darya Berg, Anton Gorbatsevich and Chuviliayev. Berg is the head of the relief and evacuation department and Gorbatsevich is the direct help and evacuation coordinator.

Sverdlin expressed surprise at how quickly the organisation expanded after its founding. He said that three days after the organisation was founded, volunteers had received over 1,000 inquiries, including questions about both legally and illegally crossing the border, requests for psychological support and questions about how to safely surrender to Ukraine. As of September 2024, Get Lost had an estimated 400 volunteers.

=== Desertions ===
In January 2023, there were 28 people who requested help with desertion. In January the following year, there were 284. Approximately two thirds of those who have deserted left Russia. Desertion rates have continued to climb, with approximately 5,200 people being prosecuted for desertion in the first seven months of 2024, greater than the entirety of 2023; many are given suspended sentences and sent back to combat units.

According to an estimate by Get Lost, approximately half of the potential deserters are those who signed contracts after the start of the war, including those forced to sign a contract. A further 10% are those who signed up before the war and another 30% are mobilised reservists.

In October 2023, Berg spoke with The Guardian in regards to why some soldiers desert, saying "Some of those soldiers who are deserting now were injured in the fighting and don’t want to go back having seen the horror. Others are exhausted since they haven’t been rotated since the war started in Ukraine." Sverdlin, when speaking to The Moscow Times in December that year, agreed with this, saying that most soldiers desert after being wounded and treated. In March 2024 Sverdlin also concurred that a common reason for desertion was a lack of rotations. Berg also said that many of the messages that Get Lost receives are from women, relatives of soldiers who are trying to help them escape.

On 20 December 2023, it was reported that Dmitry Setrakov, a Russian soldier who had deserted from his unit in Ukraine, was abducted by members of the Military Police of Russia disguised as soldiers of the Armed Forces of Armenia on either 6 or 7 December in Gyumri, Armenia, then transferred to the Russian military base there. From there he was forcibly repatriated to Rostov-on-Don, Russia on 19 December to face criminal charges. This marked the first time that someone Get Lost had helped was forcibly returned to Russia.

When asked by Novaya Gazeta Europe why Russia made such an effort to catch him, Sverdlin said "He really is just a regular conscript. Setrakov’s case is probably just a coincidence. They were hardly chasing a specific person. I don’t think anyone went to Armenia just to pursue him. He was most likely kidnapped by people stationed at one of the Russian military bases in Armenia, in Gyumri or Yerevan. It was illegal, of course."
