= Pososhniye lyudi =

Conscripts in the Russian army of the 16th–17th centuries

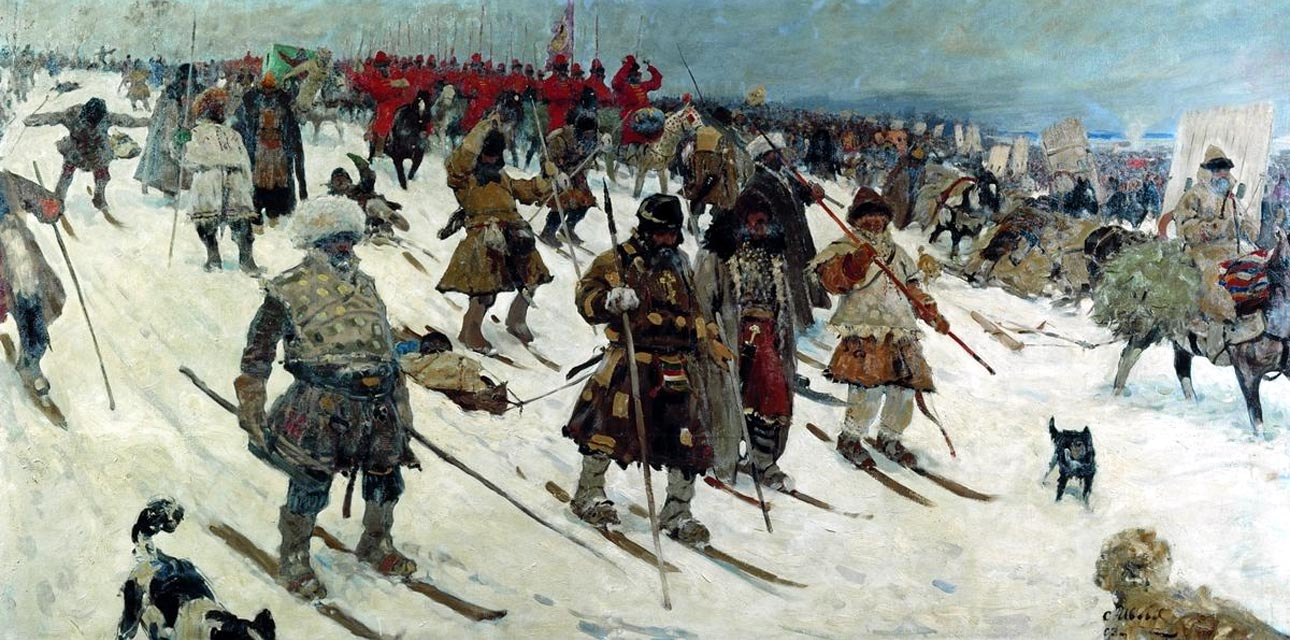
"Campaign of Muscovites. XVI century" by Sergey Ivanov (1903): winter campaign against the Lithuanians

The pososhniye lyudi (Russian: посошные люди) was a collective name for the conscripts in the Russian army of the 16th–17th centuries, called up for military service from each sokha (the word pososhniye is a derivative from sokha, hence the term). The term pososhnaya sluzhba (sokha-based military service) first appeared at the turn of the 15th–16th centuries. The pososhniye lyudi were called up for service by the order of the tsar. According to the 1547 ukase, the army officials had to travel to villages and enlist for the Kazan campaign two people from each sokha (mounted and unmounted). The slobodas had to provide one man from ten households. The pososhniye lyudi (also known as posokha and pososhnaya rat') were used as infantry and performed auxiliary functions, such as the construction of fortifications, servicing of siege engines, artillery weapons etc. In the 16th century, the pososhniye lyudi were used for construction or repairs in peacetime, as well.

== See also ==
- Narodnoe Opolcheniye
