= Historical Russian units of measurement =

Traditional system of measurement used in Imperial Russia

Set of Russian customary units of measurement based on body proportions.

Historical Russian units of measurement were standardized and used in the Russian Empire but were abandoned in the Russian Soviet Federative Socialist Republic (RSFSR) after 1918, and officially replaced on 21 July 1925, when the Soviet Union adopted the metric system.

== History ==
Before the reign of Peter the Great (1682–1725), Russia had its own traditional systems of measurement. From the 12th to 15th centuries, during the period of political fragmentation, Russian systems of measurement were diverse until the emergence of an all-Russian system of measurement.

Although Peter is sometimes believed to have replaced Russian units with English units, in reality, he did not significantly change Russian units. Instead, the Russian units were redefined relative to the English system. He also did not apply Russian units in areas where the Russians had limited experience, such as in shipyards. The system also used Cyrillic numerals until the 18th century, when Peter the Great replaced it with the Hindu–Arabic numeral system.

The metric system was used from 1899 and remained legally optional from 1900 until it was made compulsory in the Russian SFSR in 1918.

== Length ==
The basic unit was the Russian ell, called the arshin, which is known in sources from the 16th century. The lokot (elbow) was replaced around this time. The Ivansky lokot, dating to the 11th or 12th century and used in Novgorod, was about 547mm. The arshin was originally the length of a man's arm from the shoulder. It was standardized by Peter the Great in the 18th century to measure exactly twenty-eight English inches (71.12 cm). Thus, 80 vershoks = 20 pyads = 5 arshins = 140 English inches (355.60 cm).

A pyad (пядь, "palm", "five"), known since the 12th century, or chyetvyert (че́тверть, "quarter") is a hand span, the distance between ends of the spread thumb and index finger.

| Unit | | | Ratio | Metric value | English value | Source |
| Russian | | Translation | Ratio | Metric value | English value | Source |
| Cyrillic | Transliteration | Translation | Ratio | Metric value | English value | Source |
|---|---|---|---|---|---|---|
| то́чка | tochka | point | 1/2800 | 0.254 mm | 1/100 in | |
| ли́ния | liniya | line | 1/280 | 2.54 mm | 1/10 in; cf. line | |
| дюйм (перст) | dyuym (pyerst) | inch (finger) | 1/28 | 2.54 cm | 1 inch | |
| вершо́к | vyershok | tip, top | 1/16 | 4.445 cm | 1 3/4 in | |
| ладо́нь | ladon' | palm | 3/28 | 7.62 cm | 3 in; cf. palm | |
| пядь, че́тверть | pyad', chyetvyert' | quarter | 1/4 | 17.78 cm | 7 in; cf. span | |
| фут | fut | foot | 3/7 | 30.48 cm | 1 foot | |
| ло́коть | lokot' | elbow, ell/cubit | 9/14 | 45.72 cm | 1 1/2 ft; cf. ell/cubit | |
| шаг | shag | stride, step | 1 | 71.12 cm | cf. step | |
| арши́н | arshin | yard | 1 | 71.12 cm | 2 1/3 ft | |
| саже́нь, са́жень | sazhen' | fathom | 3 | 2.1336 m | 7 ft | |
| верста́ | vyersta | turn (of a plough) | 1500 | 1.0668 km | 3,500 ft | |

Alternative units:

- Swung sazhen' (маховая сажень, makhovaya sazhen', distance between tips of arms stretched sidewards) = 1.76 m;
- Skewed, or oblique sazhen' (косая сажень, kosaya sazhen', distance between tip of a raised arm and a tip of an opposite leg slightly put away) = 2.48 m / 2.4892 m to be exact, since 1 kosaya sazhen' is equal to 3.5 arshins which is equal to 98 inches;
- Double vyersta or border vyersta, (межевая верста, mezhevaya vyersta), used to measure land plots and distances between settlements = 2 vyerstas (comes from an older standard for vyersta).

== Area ==
- Desyatina (десяти́на, "a tenth" or "ten"), approximately one hectare;
  - Treasury/official desyatina (казённая десяти́на, kazyonnaya desyatina) = 10,925.4 m^{2} = 117,600 sq ft = 2.7 acres = 2,400 square sazhen';
  - Proprietor's (владе́льческая десяти́на, vladel'cheskaya desyatina) = 14,567.2 m^{2} = 156,800 sq ft = 3,200 square sazhen';
    - 3 proprietor's desyatinas = 4 official desyatinas;
- Sokha (соха, "big plow"), major unit for land tax calculation.

== Volume ==
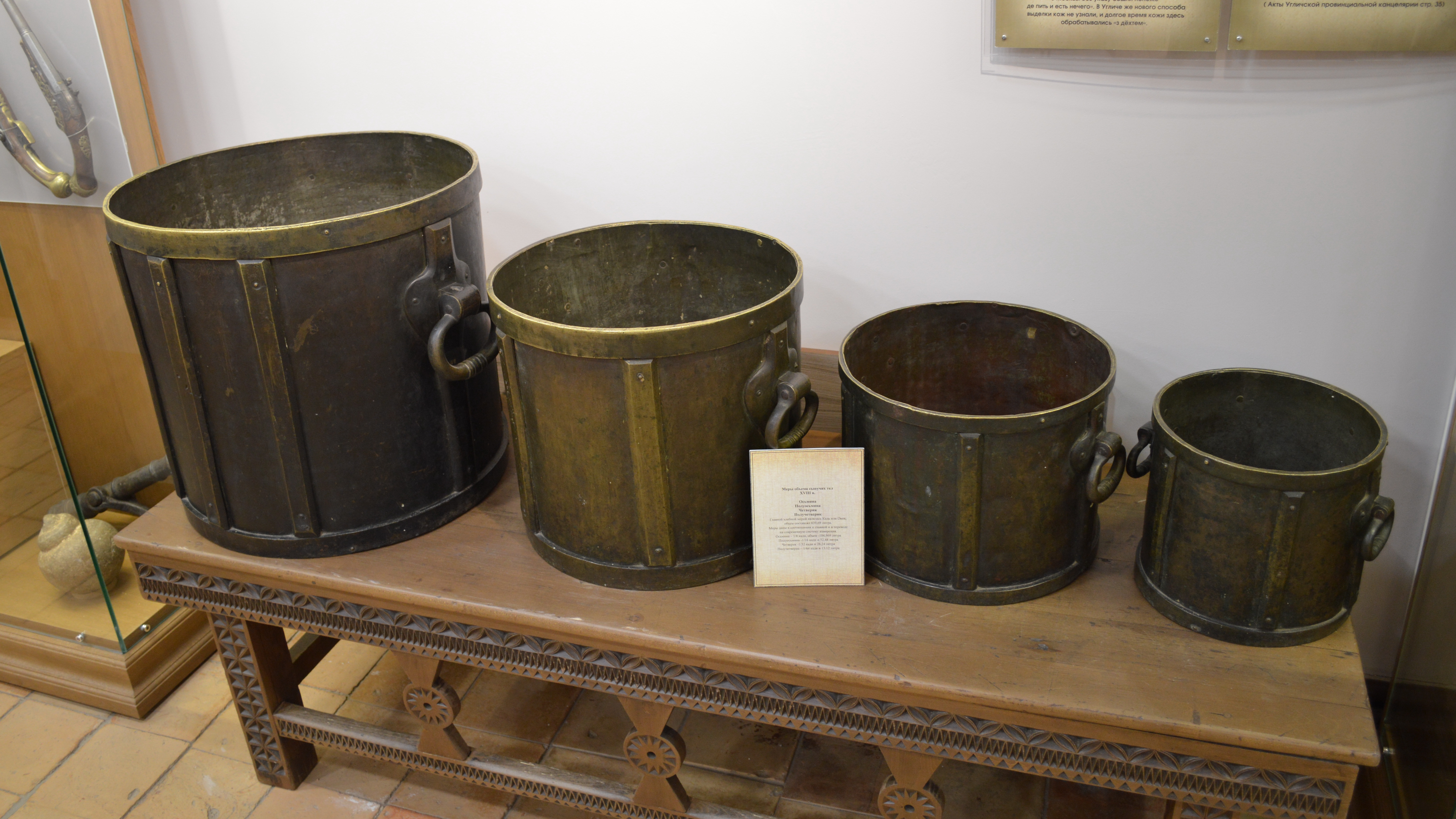
Dry volume measures: os'mina, poluos'mina, chyetvyerik, poluchyetvyerik

As in many ancient systems of measurement, the Russian one distinguishes between dry and liquid measurements of capacity. Note that the chyetvyert' appears in both lists with vastly differing values.

=== Dry measures ===
| Unit | Russian | Translation | Ratio | Cubic inches (exact) | Metric value | Imperial value | U.S. customary | Source |
|---|---|---|---|---|---|---|---|---|
| chast' | часть | part | 1/30 | 6 2/3 | 109.33 ml | 4.380 fl oz | 4.208 fl oz | |
| kruzhka | кру́жка | mug | 2/5 | 80 | 1.312 L | 2.309 pints | 2.773 pints | |
| garnyec | га́рнец | pot | 1 | 200 | 3.279842 L | 5.772 pints | 3.466 quarts | |
| vyedro | ведро́ | bucket | 4 | 800 | 13.12 L | 2.886 gal | 3.466 gal | |
| chyetvyerik | четвери́к | small quarter | 8 | 1,600 | 26.239 L | 2.886 pecks | 2.978 pecks | |
| os'mina | осьми́на | one-eighth | 32 | 6,400 | 104.955 L | 2.886 bushels | 2.978 bushels | |
| chyetvyert' | че́тверть | quarter | 64 | 12,800 | 209.91 L | 5.772 bushels | 5.957 bushels | |

=== Liquid measures ===
| Unit | Russian | Translation | Ratio | Cubic inches (exact) | Metric value | Imperial | U.S. Customary | Source |
|---|---|---|---|---|---|---|---|---|
| shkalik | шка́лик | measure | 1/200 | 3 3/4 | 61.5 ml | 2.16 fl oz | 2.08 fl oz | |
| kosushka | косу́шка | shot | 1/200 | 3 3/4 | 61.5 ml | 2.16 fl oz | 2.08 fl oz | |
| charka | ча́рка | wine glass | 1/100 | 7 1/2 | 123 ml | 4.33 fl oz | 4.16 fl oz | |
| chetushka | чету́шка | pair charka | 1/50 | 15 | 246 ml | 8.66 fl oz | 8.32 fl oz | |
| butylka (vodochnaya) | буты́лка (во́дочная) | bottle (vodka) | 1/20 | 37 1/2 | 615 ml | 1.08 pints | 1.3 pints | |
| butylka (vinnaya) | буты́лка (ви́нная) | bottle (wine) | 1/16 | 46 7/8 | 768.7 ml | 1.35 pints | 1.625 pints | |
| kruzhka | кру́жка | mug | 1/10 | 75 | 1.23 L | 2.16 pints | 1.3 quarts | |
| shtof | штоф | flagon | 1/10 | 75 | 1.23 L | 2.16 pints | 1.3 quarts | |
| chyetvyert | че́тверть | quarter | 1/8 | 93 3/4 | 1.537 L | 2.70 pints | 1.624 quarts | |
| vedro | ведро́ | bucket | 1 | 750 | 12.29941 L | 2.71 gal | 3.249 gal | |
| bochka | бо́чка | barrel | 40 | 30,000 | 491.98 L | 108.22 gal | 129.967 gal | |

== Weight/mass ==
Two systems of weight were in use, an ordinary one in common use, and an apothecaries' system.

=== Ordinary system ===
| Unit | Russian | Translation | Ratio | Metric value | Avoirdupois value | Source |
|---|---|---|---|---|---|---|
| dolya | до́ля | part, portion | 1/9216 = 1/96^{2} | 44.435 mg | 0.686 gr | |
| zolotnik | золотни́к | "golden one" | 1/96 | 4.26580 g | 65.831 gr (0.152 oz) | |
| lot | лот | borrowed German "Loth" | 1/32 | 12.7974 g | 0.451 oz | |
| funt | фунт | pound | 1 | 409.51718 g | 14.445 oz (0.903 lb) | |
| pood | пуд | borrowed Late Latin "pondo", from Classical "pondus" | 40 | 16.3807 kg | 36.121 lb | |
| Berkovets | берковец | probably from "Birka pood" | 400 | 163.807 kg | 361.206 lb (25.8 stone) | |

The pood was first mentioned in documents in the 12th century. It may still be encountered in documents dealing with agricultural production (especially with reference to cereals), and has been revived in determining weights when casting bells in belfries following the rebirth of the Orthodox Churches in the former Soviet lands.

=== Apothecaries' system ===
The Imperial Russian apothecaries' weight was defined by setting the grain (Russian: гран) to be exactly seven-fifths of a dolya. The only unit name shared between the two was the funt (pound), but the one in the apothecaries' system is exactly seven-eighths of the ordinary funt.

| Unit | Russian | Translation | Ratio | Metric value | Avoirdupois value | Ordinary value |
|---|---|---|---|---|---|---|
| gran | гран | grain | 1 | 62.210 mg | 0.96004 gr | 1.4 dolya |
| skrupul | скрупул | scruple | 20 | 1.2442 g | 19.201 gr | 28 dolya |
| drakhma | драхма | dram | 60 | 3.7326 g | 57.602 gr | 7/8 zolotnik |
| unciya | унция | ounce | 480 | 29.861 g | 1.0533 oz or 460.82 gr | 7 zolotnik |
| funt | фунт | pound | 5760 | 358.328 g | 12.640 oz or 5529.8 gr | 84 zolotnik |

== Idiomatic expressions ==
The obsolete units of measurement survived in Russian culture in a number of idiomatic expressions and proverbs, for example:

- Слышно за версту: (It) can be heard a verst away – about something very loud
- Бешеной собаке семь вёрст не крюк: 7 versts is not a detour for a mad dog – about excessive energy or hassle, usually ironical
- Милому дружку семь вёрст не околица: 7 versts is not too far for a darling friend
- Верста коломенская: Kolomna verst – about a very tall and slim person (in this case the reference is to the verst pole road mark: verstovoy stolb)
- Косая сажень в плечах: A slanted sazhen in the shoulders – about a strong, wide-shouldered person
- Мерить всех на свой аршин: To gauge everybody by the same [literally: one's own] yardstick
- Проглотить аршин: To swallow an arshin (yardstick) – about standing very straight and still
- От горшка два вершка: Two vershok above the pot – a very young child
- Сто пудов: a hundred poods – a very large amount. In modern colloquial Russian it is used in a generic meanings of "very much" and "very", as well as "most surely". The adjective stopudovy and the adverb stopudovo derive from this expression.
- Семи пядей во лбу: Seven pyad across the forehead – very smart
- Не семи пядей во лбу: Not seven pyad across the forehead – not so smart
- Мал золотник, да до́рог: A zolotnik is small, but expensive: when quality rather than quantity is important
- Идти семимильными шагами: To walk in 7-mile steps – any kind of very fast progress, e.g., of improvement
- Узнать, почём фунт лиха: To learn how much a pound of likho costs – to experience something bad
- Ни пяди земли (не уступить): Do not give up (even) a pyad of land
- Съесть пуд соли (вместе с кем-либо): To eat a 'pood' of salt (with somebody) – to have a long common experience with somebody (with the implication "to know someone well")

== See also ==
- Petrograd Standard

== Sources ==
- Gouzévitch, Irina; Gouzévitch, Dmitri (2009). "Introducing mathematics, building an empire: Russia under Peter I". In Robson, Eleanor; Stedall, Jacqueline (eds.). The Oxford Handbook of the History of Mathematics. OUP Oxford. ISBN 978-0-19-921312-2.
- Gyllenbok, Jan (12 April 2018). Encyclopaedia of Historical Metrology, Weights, and Measures: Volume 3. Birkhäuser. ISBN 978-3-319-66712-6.
- Treese, Steven A. (17 May 2018). History and Measurement of the Base and Derived Units. Springer. ISBN 978-3-319-77577-7.
