= Yulia Chicherina =

Russian singer (born 1978)

- Юлия Чичерина
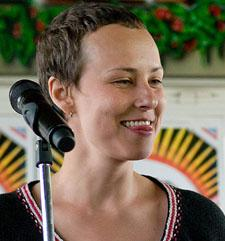
- Chicherina in 2009
- Born: Yulia Dmitriyevna Chicherina; August 7, 1978 (age 48); Sverdlovsk, Soviet Union
- Occupations: Singer; songwriter; musician; music video director; actress
- Years active: 1997–present
- Title: Merited Artist of the Russian Federation
- Spouse: Sukhrab Rajabov (m. 2008)
- Partner: Aleksandr Bury (before 2004)
- Children: 1
- Awards: Medal "Participant of the military operation in Syria"
- Musical career
- Origin: Yekaterinburg
- Genres: Rock, pop rock
- Instruments: Guitar; bass guitar; percussion; vocals
- Years active: 1997–present
- Member of: Chicherina
- Website: chicherina.info

Chicherina, officially Yulia Dmitriyevna Chicherina (Russian: Юлия Дмитриевна Чичерина), is a Russian pop-rock artist. She has been performing since 1997 and is part of the wave of Uralic rock along with Nautilus Pompilius and Chaif.

Since October 6, 2022, he has been subject to sanctions by all European Union countries for supporting Russia's invasion of Ukraine.

== Biography ==
Chicherina was born in 1978 in the city of Sverdlovsk, now known as Yekaterinburg. In 1997, she formed her own band.

Chicherina has expressed support for the self-proclaimed Donetsk People's Republic and Luhansk People's Republic in the Russo-Ukraine War. This led to her being banned from performing in the FIFA ”fan zone” in Rostov-on-Don during the 2018 World Cup. In March 2022 she was filmed taking down a Ukrainian flag in the city of Enerhodar, which was occupied during the Russian invasion of Ukraine.

== Discography ==
=== Albums ===
- 2000 – Сны (Nightdreams)
- 2001 – Течение (Flow)
- 2002 – Точки (Dots) (Live album)
- 2004 – Off/On
- 2006 – Музыкальный фильм (Musical Movie)
- 2007 – Человек-птица (Bird-Man)
- 2008 – На краю Вселенной. Человек-птица: mixed by Dub TV (At the Edge of the Universe. Bird-Man: mixed by Dub TV) (Remix album)
- 2015 – Сказка о странствии и поиске счастья (Tale About Voyage And The Search Of Happiness)
- 2017 – #Войнаимир (War And Peace or War And World)
- 2020 – Песни военных лет (Songs Of The War Years)
- 2025 – Расплавленный свинец (Melted Lead)

=== Singles ===
==== Album singles ====
Year	Song	Album
2000	Ту-лу-ла (Tu-Lu-La) (maxi single)	Сны
2009	Шила платье (I've Been Sewing The Dress)	#Войнаимир
2013	Нет, да (No, Yes) (feat. Sergey Bobunets)	Сказка о странствии и поиске счастья
2014	Рынок-лабиринт (Labyrinth Market)	Сказка о странствии и поиске счастья
2016	Пожалуйста (Please)	#Войнаимир, Песни военных лет
2016	На передовой (On The Front Line) (maxi single)	#Войнаимир, Песни военных лет
2017	Рвать (Tear Apart)	#Войнаимир, Песни военных лет
2017	Моя Спарта (My Sparta)	#Войнаимир, Песни военных лет
2018	Пересвет (Peresvet)	Песни военных лет
2019	Добровольческая (Volunteers' Song)	Песни военных лет
2019	Его оплот (His Bulwark)	Песни военных лет
2020	Воздушная гавань (Air Harbor)	Песни военных лет
2020	Партизанская (Partisans' Song)	Песни военных лет
2022	Русский лес (Russian Forest)	Расплавленный свинец
2022	Марш Русского Донбасса (Russian Donbas March)	Расплавленный свинец
2022	Ангел Херсонеса (Chersonesus Angel)	Расплавленный свинец
2023	По дороге фронтовой (On The Road Of The Frontline)	Расплавленный свинец
2023	Отбойный молоток (Jackhammer)	Расплавленный свинец
2023	Хвала (Praise)	Расплавленный свинец
2023	Посланье (Message)	Расплавленный свинец
2023	Солдат из Назарета (Soldier From Nazareth)	Расплавленный свинец
2023	Икона Донбасса (Icon Of Donbas)	Расплавленный свинец
2023	Миномётный джаз (Mortar Jazz)	Расплавленный свинец
2023	Миномётный джаз оркестр (Mortar Jazz Orchestra)	Расплавленный свинец
2023	Аллея вдов (Valley Of Widows)	Расплавленный свинец
2023	Чеканка (Metalworking)	Расплавленный свинец
2024	Бронебойная лирическая (Armour-Piercing Lyrical Song)	Расплавленный свинец
2024	Чёрный ворон (Black Raven)	Расплавленный свинец
2024	Чаша (Goblet)	Расплавленный свинец
2024	Фонтан любви (The Fountain Of Love)	Расплавленный свинец

==== Non-album singles ====
- 2001 – Дорога (Road) (maxi single)
- 2011 – Опасно! (Danger!) (maxi single)
- 2016 – Ты умеешь летать (You Can Fly) (feat. Sergey Bobunets)
- 2020 – В космос (Into Outer Space)
- 2020 – Новый мир (New World)
- 2021 – Армата (Armata) (feat. Akim Apachev)
- 2021 – Ярополк (Yaropolk)
- 2021 – Урожай (Harvest) (feat. Akim Apachev)
- 2021 – Душевное равновесие (Mental Balance) (feat. Sergey Golovnia)
- 2022 – Красная армия всех сильней (The Red Army is the Strongest)
- 2022 – Перекличка (Roll Call)
- 2022 – Зимняя песенка (Little Winter Song)
- 2023 – Русские витязи (Russian Knights)
- 2023 – Батальон Донбасс-палас (Donbass Palace Battalion)
- 2023 – На страже/Север (On Guard/North)
- 2023 – Солдат (Soldier) (feat. Akim Apachev)
- 2023 – Сомали (Somalia)
- 2023 – Русские маяки (Russian Lighthouses) (feat. Grigory Leps & Vlad Malenko)
- 2023 – Призрак победы (Ghost Of Victory)
- 2023 – Волга 149.200 (Volga 149.200) (feat. Akim Apachev)
- 2024 – Перед русским рассветом (Before Russian Dawn)
- 2024 – День победы (Day Of Victory)
- 2024 – Бобры (Beavers) (feat. Akim Apachev & Elena Lupushor)
- 2024 – Я вернусь (I'll Come Back)
- 2025 – Последний лепесток (Last Petal) (feat. Akim Apachev)
- 2025 — Ту-лу-ла Remix (Tu-Lu-La Remix) (feat. Dmitrii G & DeepSummer)
- 2025 — Заря (Dawn)
