= Up from the Depths (disambiguation) =

Up from the Depths is a 1976 American horror film directed by Charles B. Griffith.

Up from the Depths may also refer to:

- Up from the Depths (1915 film), a film directed by Paul Powell
- "Up from the Depths", an episode of the Auto-B-Good series
- "Up from the Depths", an episode of the Pucca series

== See also ==
- The Depths (disambiguation)
