= The Depths =

The Depths may refer to:

- The Lower Depths, a play by Maxim Gorky
- Na Dne, former name of Put Domoi, a Russian street newspaper
- The Depths: The Evolutionary Origins of the Depression Epidemic, a 2014 book by Jonathan Rottenberg
- The Depths (2019 film), a 2019 Canadian film directed by Ariane Louis-Seize.
