= Zolotnik =

Russian unit of weight

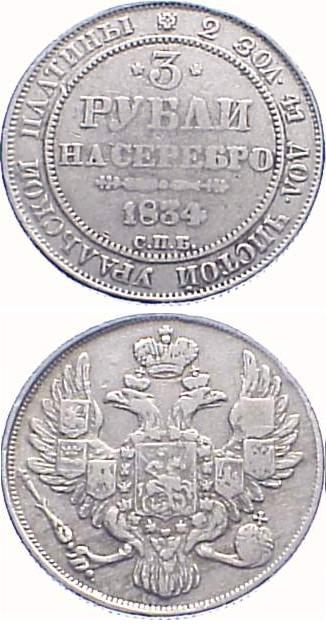
Platinum coin of 1834 worth 3 rubles; text around the edge translates as "2 zol[otniks] 41 dol[yas] of pure Ural platinum." (10.353 grams, 0.3652 troy oz)

A zolotnik (Russian: золотни́к, abbr.: zol.) is an obsolete Russian unit of weight, equal to 0.1505 avoirdupois ounces, 0.13715 troy ounce, or 4.2658 grams (about 65.83 grains). Used from the 10th to 20th centuries, its name is derived from the Russian word зо́лото /zóloto/, meaning gold. As a unit, the zolotnik was the standard for silver manufacture, much as the troy ounce is currently used for gold and other precious metals.

This unit was originally based on a coin of the same name. The zolotnik circulated in the Kievan Rus until the 11th century; it was equal in weight to the Byzantine Empire's solidus.

== Relation to other units ==
The Russian pound was known as the funt. There were 96 zolotniki in a pound. A smaller unit, the lot, was equal to three zolotniki. There were 96 dolya in a single zolotnik.

The zolotnik was also used to measure fineness of precious metals (gold, silver, platinum). In this case, the ratio zolotnik/funt was meant, so one zolotnik meant 1/96. For example, 14-karat (58.33%) gold was named "56-zolotnik gold" in Russia. As one karat means 1/24, one zolotnik is 1/4 karat.

91 zolotnik Russian silver has a millesimal fineness of 947.9. 88 zolotnik has a fineness of .9166. It contains 91.66% pure silver. 84 zolotnik is the most common fineness of .875.

== See also ==
- Zloty
- Obsolete Russian units of measurement
- Obsolete Tatar units of measurement

=== Russian measurements ===
- Berkovets
- Pood
