= Nochlezhka =

Russian NGO helping homeless people

Charity Nochlezhka (Russian: Благотворительная организация «Ночле́жка») is a Russian NGO helping homeless people. It works in Saint Petersburg and Moscow.

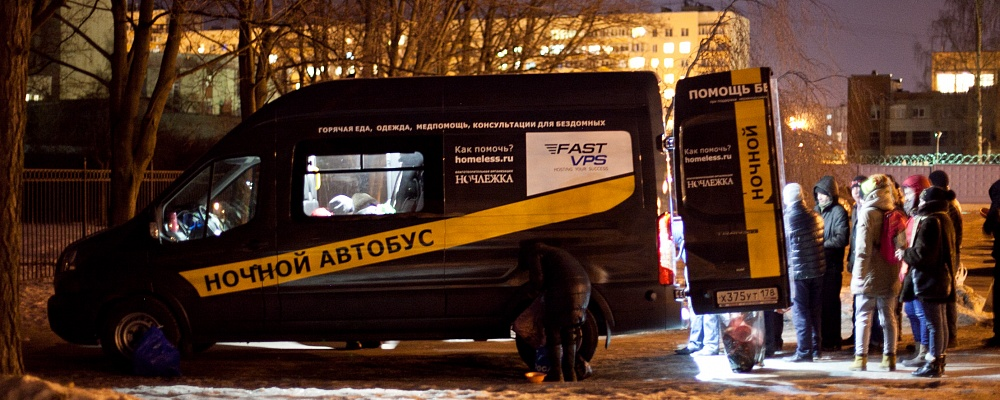
Distribution of food from a Night Bus

Nochlezhka started in 1993 publishing newspaper Put Domoi (originally Na Dne) sold by homeless.

Grigory Sverdlin, the forty-three-year-old director, was forced to leave Russia.
