= Homelessness in Russia =

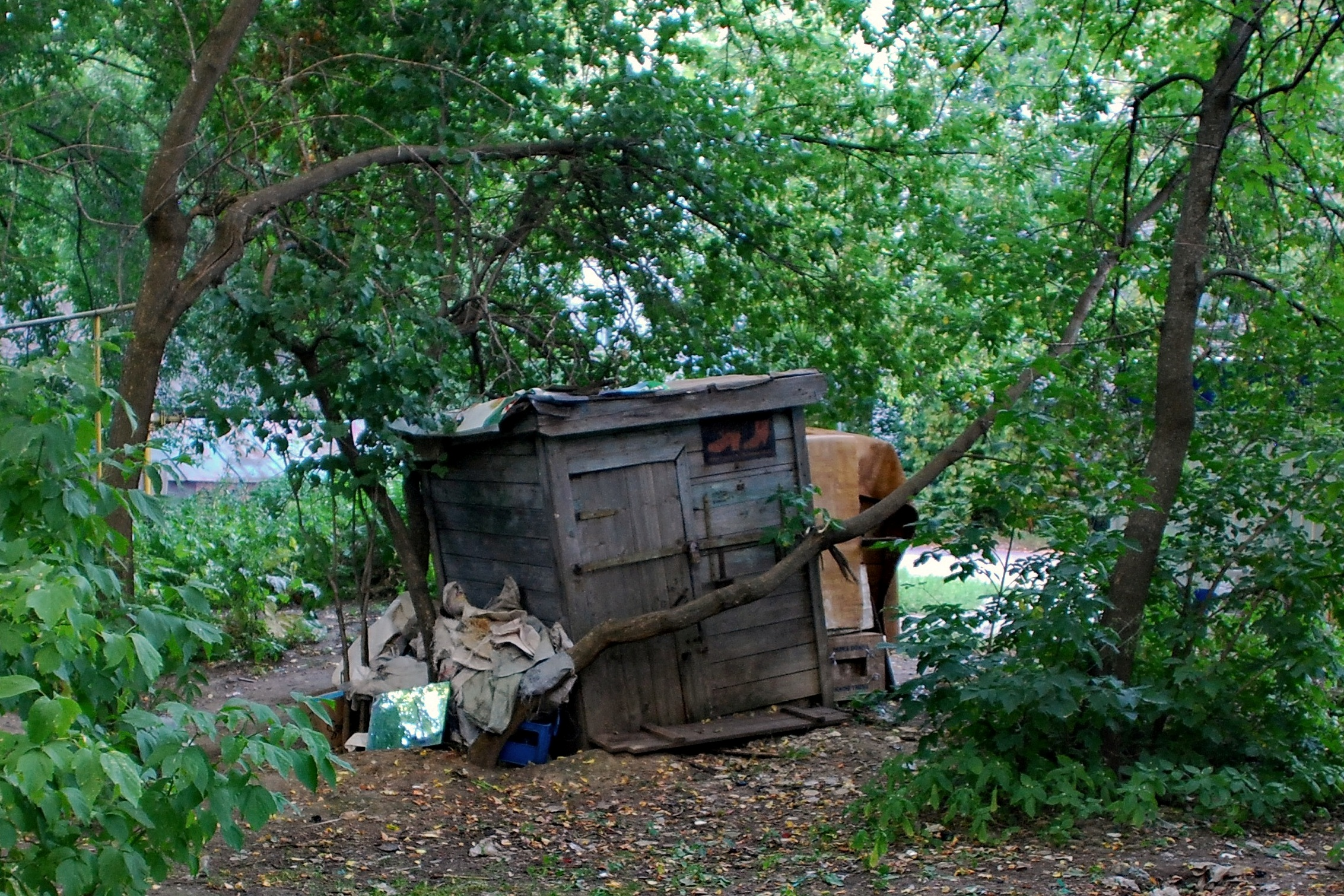
Homeless shack in Ivanovo

Homelessness in Russia has been observed since the end of the 19th century. After the abolition of serfdom, major cities experienced a large influx of former serfs who sought jobs as industrial workers in the rapidly developing Russian industry. These people often lived in harsh conditions, sometimes renting a room, shared between several families. There were also many homeless people.

== History ==
=== Soviet Russia ===
Immediately after the October Revolution, a special program of "densification" (уплотнение) was enabled: people who had no shelter were settled in flats of those who had multiple unused rooms, with only one room left to previous owners. The flats were declared state property. This led to numerous shared flats where several families lived simultaneously. Nevertheless, the problem of complete homelessness was mostly solved as anybody could apply for a room or a place in dormitory (the number of shared flats steadily decreased after large-scale residential building program was implemented starting in the 1960s).

By 1922, there were at least 7 million homeless children in Russia as a result of nearly a decade of devastation from World War I and the Russian Civil War. This led to the creation of many orphanages. By the 1930s, the USSR declared the abolition of homelessness and every citizen was obliged to have a propiska – a place of permanent residency. Nobody could be stripped of propiska without substitution or refuse it without a confirmed permission (called "order") to register in another place. If someone wanted to move to another city or expand their living area, they had to find a partner who wanted to mutually exchange the flats. The right for shelter was secured in the Soviet constitution. Not having permanent residency was legally considered a crime. There were also virtually no empty and unused apartments in the cities: any flat where nobody was registered was immediately lent by the state at a symbolic price to others who needed better living conditions. If a person who had permanent registration could not pay for shelter, nobody had the right to evict them, only to demand money through the court. However, this did not put an end to homelessness in the USSR; Soviet journalist Alexei Lebedev after living in the vagrant community in Moscow stated that there were "hundreds of thousands" of homeless in the USSR and that the homeless community's presence was becoming more noticeable in the later years of the USSR.

After 1957, the USSR built 2.2 million units every year. Due to the institution of basic housing rent, rent only made up about 5% of a family's monthly budget, although in Moscow, the average family only spent 3% of their budget on rent.

=== After the breakup of the USSR ===
After the breakup of the USSR and adopting capitalism, the problem of homelessness sharpened dramatically, partially because of the legal vacuum of the early 1990s with some laws contradicting each other and partially because of a high rate of frauds in the realty market. In 1991, articles 198 and 209 of Russian criminal code which instituted a criminal penalty for not having permanent residence were abolished. Because most flats had been privatized and many people sold their last shelter without successfully buying another, there was a sharp increase of the homeless. Renting apartments from a private owner became widespread (which usually only gives temporary registration and the apartment owner could evict the lessee after the contract is over, or if the rent was unpaid). In Moscow, the first overnight shelter for the homeless was opened in 1992. In the late 1990s, certain amendments in law were implemented to reduce the rise in homelessness, such as the prohibition of selling the last home with registered children.

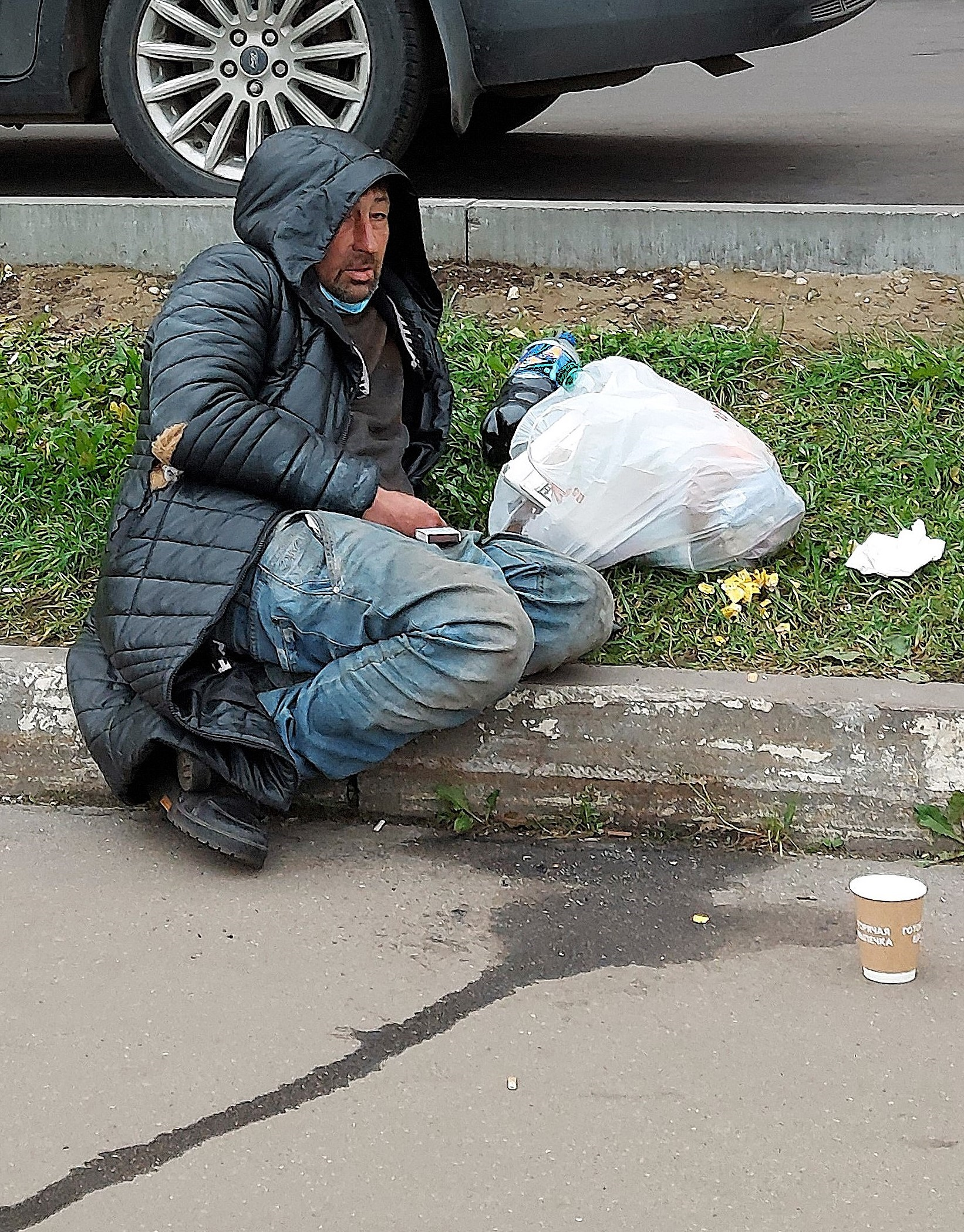
A homeless man in Moscow, Russia in 2021

== Today ==
Nevertheless, the state is still obligated to provide permanent shelter free of charge to anyone who needs better living conditions or lacks permanent registration; the right to shelter is still enshrined in the constitution. However, this may take many years. It is illegal to strip a person of permanent residency without their will, even the owner of the apartment. This creates problems for banks because mortgage loans have become increasingly popular. Banks are obliged to provide a new, cheaper flat for a person instead of the old one if the person fails to repay the loan, or wait until all people who live in the flat are dead. Several projects of special cheap 'social' flats for those who failed to repay mortgages were proposed to facilitate the mortgage market.

According to official Rosstat data, there were around 11,285 homeless people in the country in 2021, compared to 64,077 in 2010.

There exists a NGO called Nochlezhka that operates in Saint Petersburg and Moscow and helps homeless people find a home. The organization claims that official data understimates the real number, since even Rosstat figures show that 22,426 homeless people died in Russia in 2021, a number far greater than the total number of homeless people in the country according to its own estimates. Nochlezkha asserts that in 2022, around 2 million Russians were possibly living without a home.
