= Chetushka =

Obsolete Russian unit of liquid volume

- Unit system: Russian units
- Unit of: Volume of liquid
- Named after: Dmitry Afanasyevich Chekushkin

Conversions
| 1 chetushka in ... | ... is equal to ... |
- SI: ≈ 246 mL

A chetushka (Russian: четушка) is an obselete Russian unit of liquid volume equal to 246 mL. The chetushka is named after the pair of charok that it held.

With the introduction of the metric system, the word chetushka lost its original meaning and evolved into the chekushka (a term for a small bottle of vodka); this shift was influenced by the name of Dmitry Afanasyevich Chekushkin, a 20th-century Saint Petersburg merchant who sold alcohol-based extracts. In 1918, the Bolsheviks issued a decree abolishing colloquial names for units of measurement; consequently, the term chekushka—referring to a volume of one-quarter of a liter—became the established colloquial name, replacing the chetushka.
