= Conscription in Russia =

Conscription in Russia (Russian: всеобщая воинская обязанность, romanized: vseobshchaya voinskaya obyazannost, translated as "universal military obligation" or "liability for military service") is currently a 12-month draft without pay, which is mandatory for all men who are between 18 and 30 years old, with a number of exceptions. Avoiding the draft is a felony under Russian criminal code and is punishable by up to 26 months of imprisonment or a sizeable fine. Women are exempt from conscription, which has been described as discrimination against men.

Employment of male citizens 18 to 30 years old is banned by the Labour Code of Russia unless military papers are provided to employers, who are required by law to keep records of all male employees. It is usually hard for draft-evaders to get employment and they are routinely discriminated against despite attempts by the Ministry of Labour to clarify that such discrimination is illegal. This severe and prolonged discrimination has resulted in a growing shadow economy in Russia.

In April 2023 the new law allowed the government to draft conscripts into Russia army via electronic notices, replacing previously old in-person notification system which was ineffective, making it legally hard to avoid conscription.

In 2023, during the Russo-Ukrainian war, Putin's government made it harder to avoid mandatory unpaid military service and tightened legal responsibility. Besides mandatory military service, the Russian government has tried to lure conscripts into signing military contracts which as of 2022 became indefinite.

As of 2025 conscripts in Russia have indirectly supported the war effort in Ukraine by way of logistics and border service.

== History ==
=== Imperial Russia ===
Before Peter I, Russia's military was primarily drawn from the nobility and people who owned land on condition of service. During wars, additional recruiting of volunteers and ordinary citizens was common. Peter I introduced a regular army consisting of the nobility and recruits, including conscripts. The conscripts to the Imperial Russian Army were called "recruits" in Russia (not to be confused with voluntary recruitment, which did not appear until the early 20th century). The system was called "recruit obligation" (Russian: рекрутская повинность, romanized: rekrutskaya povinnost).

Russian tsars before Peter maintained professional hereditary musketeer corps (streltsy in Russian) that were highly unreliable and undisciplined. In times of war, Russia augmented its armed forces with feudal cavalry and peasant levies. Peter I formed the Imperial Russian Army built on the German model, but with a new aspect: the Army did not necessarily draw officers from the nobility, giving talented commoners promotions that eventually included a noble title at the attainment of an officer's rank. Russia organised the conscription of peasants and townspeople on a quota system per settlement. Initially, it based conscription on the number of households in a given area. Later it was calculated on population numbers. Conscripted serfs dramatically increased the size of the Russian military during the Napoleonic Wars.

The term of service in the 18th century was effectively for life, so long as an individual remained physically capable. In 1736 it was reduced to 25 years, with one male member of each family excluded from the obligation to serve in order to manage shared property. In 1834 the term was reduced to 20 years plus five years in the reserve, and in 1855 to 12 years plus three years of reserve liability.

After the Russian defeat in the Crimean War during the reign of Alexander II, the Minister of War Dmitry Milyutin introduced military reforms, with an initial draft presented in 1862. On 1 January 1874, a statute concerning conscription was approved by the Tsar by which military service was generally made compulsory for males at the age of 21. The term of actual service for the land army was reduced to 6 years, followed by nine years in the reserve. This measure created a large pool of military reservists ready to be mobilized in the event of war while permitting the maintenance of a smaller active army during peacetime. Most naval conscripts had an obligation for seven years of service, reflecting the extended period required for technical training.

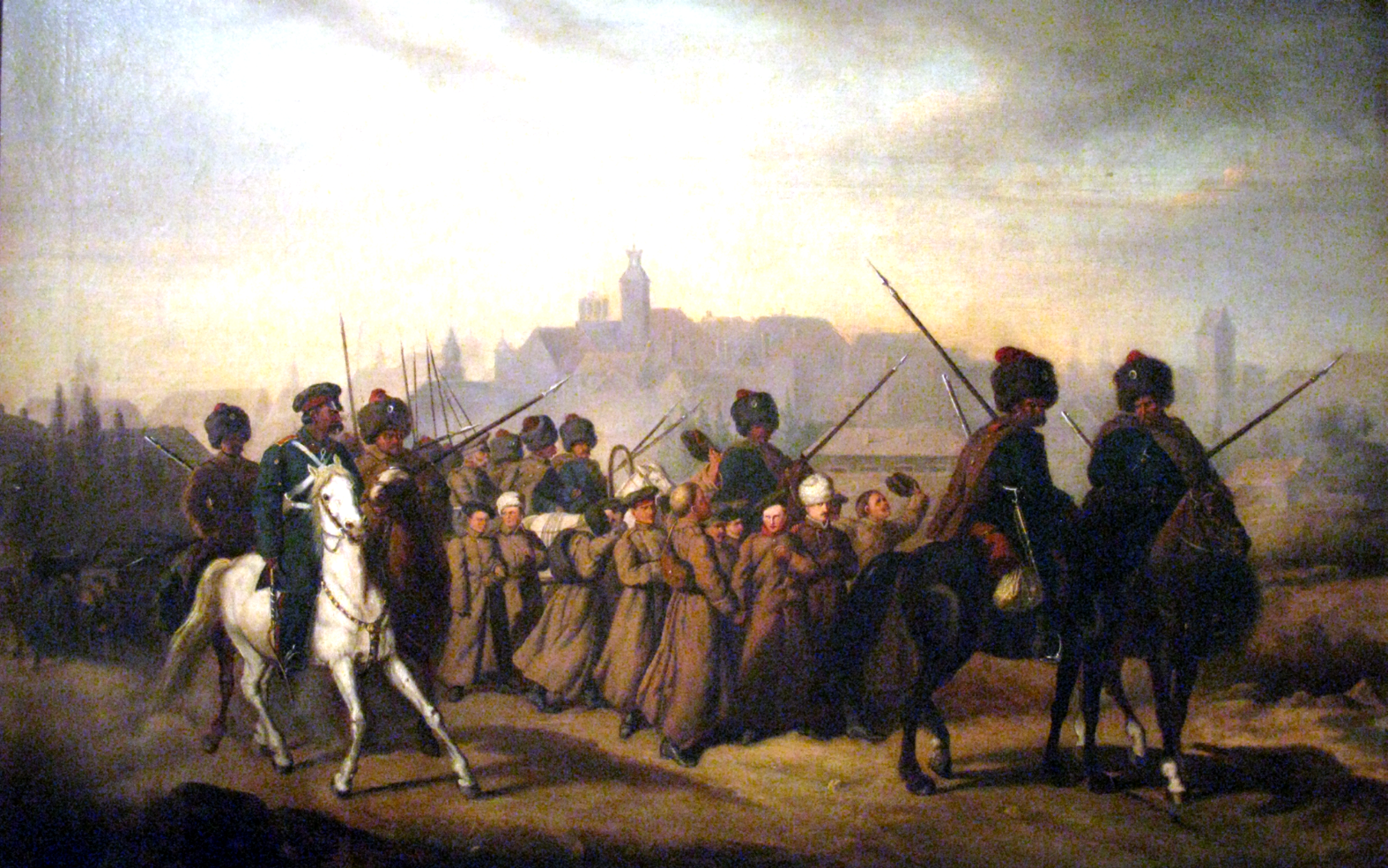
Forced conscription of Poles to the Russian Army in 1863 that precipitated the January Uprising in Poland.

Immediately before the outbreak of World War I, the Imperial Government imposed compulsory service of three years for entrants to infantry and artillery regiments and four years for cavalry and engineers. After completing this initial period of full-time service, conscripts passed into the first class reserves for seven years. The final obligation for compulsory service ended at age 43, after eight years in the second reserves.

The large population of Russia permitted exemptions from military service on a greater scale than in other European armies of the period. Muslims and members of certain other racial or religious minorities were generally exempted from conscription, as were about half of the Russian Orthodox population. Only sons in a family were normally not required to serve. Until 1903 the Military of the Grand Duchy of Finland was organised as a separate entity.

=== Soviet Union ===
The first all-union conscription law of 1925 was tailored for the mixed cadre-militia structure of the peacetime Red Army after the Civil War. The draft-age was 21 years. Terms of service varied between one year in territorial formations and 2 to 4 years in the cadre army. Only "workers and peasants" were seen as worthy to serve in combat units. Men of other social backgrounds were restricted to rear or labor services or had to pay a military tax.

The 1936 Soviet Constitution declared military service a "sacred duty" of all Soviet citizens. The Constitution dropped any reservations regarding social or national background. A 1939 service law lowered the call-up age to 19. The Red army had adopted a full-cadre structure in the 1930s.

During the Great Patriotic War, all non-disabled men of ages 18–51 were subject to draft except specialists declared vitally necessary in the domestic military/defense industry.

Soviet Armed Forces completed post-World War II demobilisation in 1948. A 1949 service law set service terms at three years in ground forces and four years in the navy.

==== Late Soviet Union ====
The late Soviet Armed Forces were manned by a mandatory draft (with some exceptions) for all able-bodied males for 2 years (3 years for seagoing parts of the Navy and Border troops), based on the 1967 Law on Universal Military Service. A bi-annual call-up in spring and autumn was introduced then, replacing the annual draft in fall. The conscripts were normally sent to serve far away from their residence.

Men were subject to draft at the age of 18. The draft could be postponed due to continued education. However, since the early 1980s Soviet Union had a mandatory draft for students of most colleges/universities — the first mass student recruitment was in spring 1983, the maximum conscription fraction in 1987 — until it was abolished in the spring of 1989. Students were drafted for two or, if for the navy, three years of military service typically after termination (more seldom in the middle) of the first or second year of college.

Most universities had military departments which were in charge of military training of all non-disabled male students to become reserve officers of a particular military specialty depending on the university. At the moment of the Dissolution of the Soviet Union, there were 397 civilian institutions of higher education which had military departments in the USSR. There was the practice of the selective conscription of graduates of civilian institutions of higher education (universities, academies and, strictly speaking, institutions), who have graduated the military departments of their almae matres and received a commission as an officer, in the Soviet Union. Such a person could be conscripted from the reserve of armed forces to active duty, but until the age of 27 only; the period of active duty of such an officer was several years, and at the end of that period, he was due to be enlisted in the reserve of the armed forces again. Such officers were called "blazers" in army slang (for example, Anatoly Kvashnin was a "blazer").

== Russian Federation ==
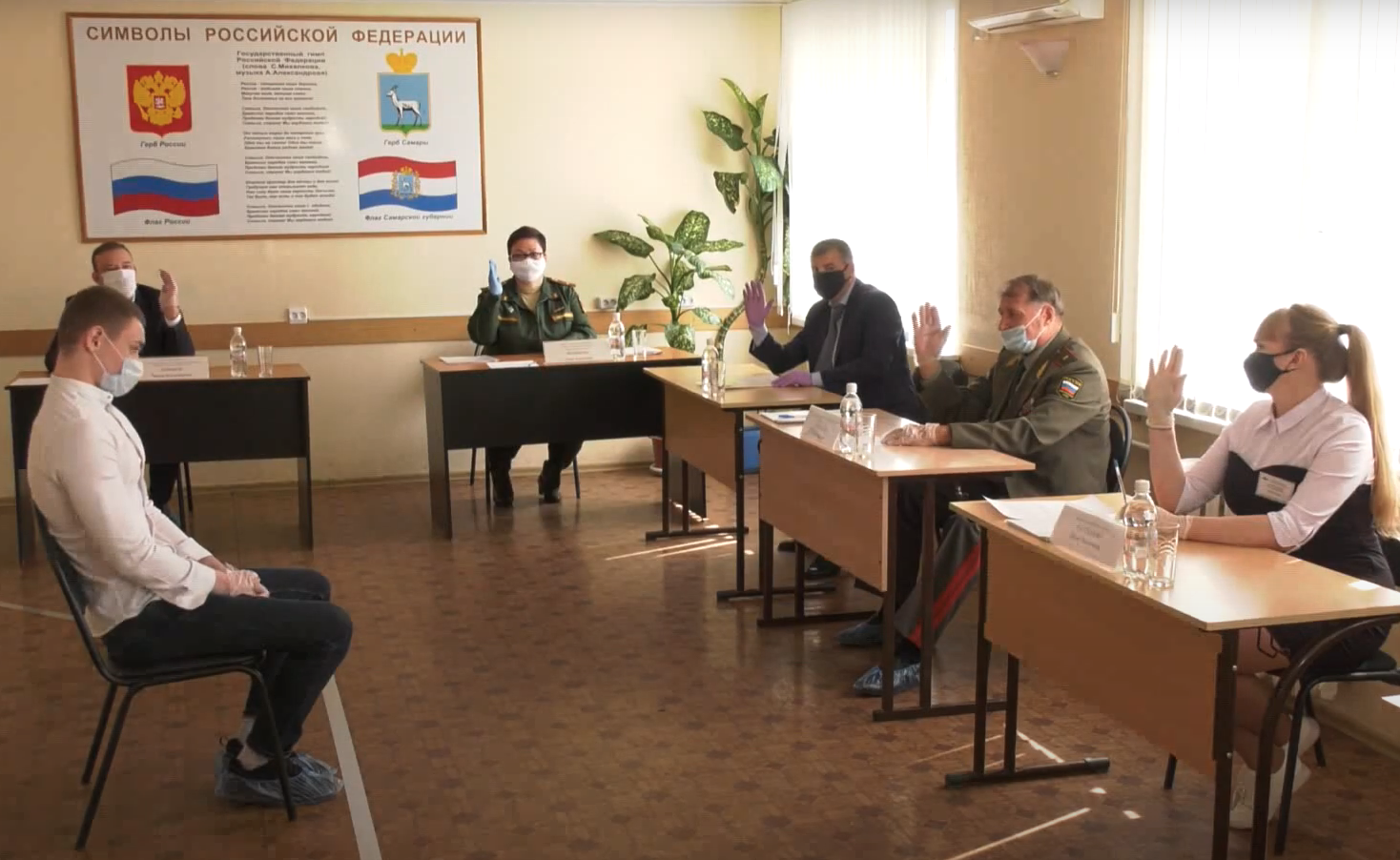
The draft board in one of the districts of Samara Oblast during the COVID-19 pandemic

The two-year conscription term in force in the USSR after 1967 continued in Russia following the 1991 collapse of the Soviet Union until 2006, when the Government of Russia and State Duma gradually reduced the term of service to 18 months for those conscripted in 2007 and to one year from 2008, while removing some excuses from conscription (such as non-conscription of rural doctors and teachers, of men who have a child younger than 3 years, etc.) from 1 January 2008.

As of 2021, all male citizens aged 18–27 are subject to conscription for 1 year of active duty military service in the armed forces, but the precise number of conscripts for each of the recruitment campaigns, which are usually held twice annually, is prescribed by a particular Presidential Decree.

=== Legal exemptions from draft ===
Russian law provides some grounds for temporary postponement of and permanent exemption from military draft. For example, it is written into law that students in higher education obtain deferments. People with very serious medical conditions are usually exempted from the draft. Proving that such medical condition is present is a costly process and requires significant time, medical analysis, and efforts, making medical exemption difficult.

The conscription of graduates of civilian institutions of higher education, who have graduated the military departments of their universities and received a commission as an officer was abolished on 1 January 2008 when the amendments, contained in Federal Law of 6 July 2006, No.104-FZ, entered into force.

=== Gender asymmetry and discrimination based on sex ===
The exclusively male nature of the conscription system in the Russian Federation is a subject of analysis within gender studies and is viewed by a number of legal scholars and sociologists as a form of institutional discrimination against men in Russia.

- Legal aspect: The Constitutional Court of the Russian Federation traditionally justifies the legality of male-only conscription based on the physiological differences between the sexes and the need for state protection of motherhood, as enshrined in its rulings. Yet these rulings create a legal conflict: exempting women from conscription while granting them the same right as men to serve under contract violates the principle of equality of human rights and freedoms regardless of gender (Article 19, Part 3 of the Constitution of the Russian Federation).
- Distortion of gender indices: Economists point to a systemic methodological issue: international gender equality indices (such as the World Economic Forum's Global Gender Gap Index or World Bank rankings) traditionally disregard the existence of mandatory male conscription when assessing levels of discrimination across countries. Factoring military service obligations into these calculations would significantly alter the rankings of countries like Russia, where men bear a heavy, non-market state obligation that is entirely absent for women.
- Sociological aspect: Sociologists (notably Olga Isupova) note that male conscription fosters societal expectations of "male utility"—viewing men solely as expendable resources for the state and national defense, obligated to risk their lives and health while suppressing their own empathy and psychological needs to conform to the tenets of militarized masculinity.

=== Draft evasion preventions ===
In 2011 draft evasion was so rampant the Putin government decided to discriminate against those who avoided mandatory military service by issuing unusual military papers for those who avoided it up to their age of 27 years old.

Under Russian Labor Code any employment of potential male conscripts is not allowed (though it is not directly punishable, but males are systematically discriminated against) unless military papers are provided to the employer. In order to obtain such military papers a conscript is required to serve, unpaid, in the army. Additionally, the governmental decree requires companies to report any conscripts discovered to the authorities. The Ministry of Labor of Russia has tried to clarify that discrimination of employment based on lack of military papers is illegal.

=== Russo-Ukrainian war (2022–present) ===
On 8 March 2022, following the Russian invasion of Ukraine, president Vladimir Putin claimed that no conscripts would be used in the war.

In April 2023 due to the growing number of draft evaders during the Russo-Ukrainian war the Russian State Duma passed legislation (Federal Law № 127-FZ of 2023) which enabled the Russian government to control male citizens who have received mobilization summons via limitations that can be imposed on various constitutional rights, such as right to move, sell property, organize entrepreneurship or access to obtaining a driver license or even access to banking credit services.

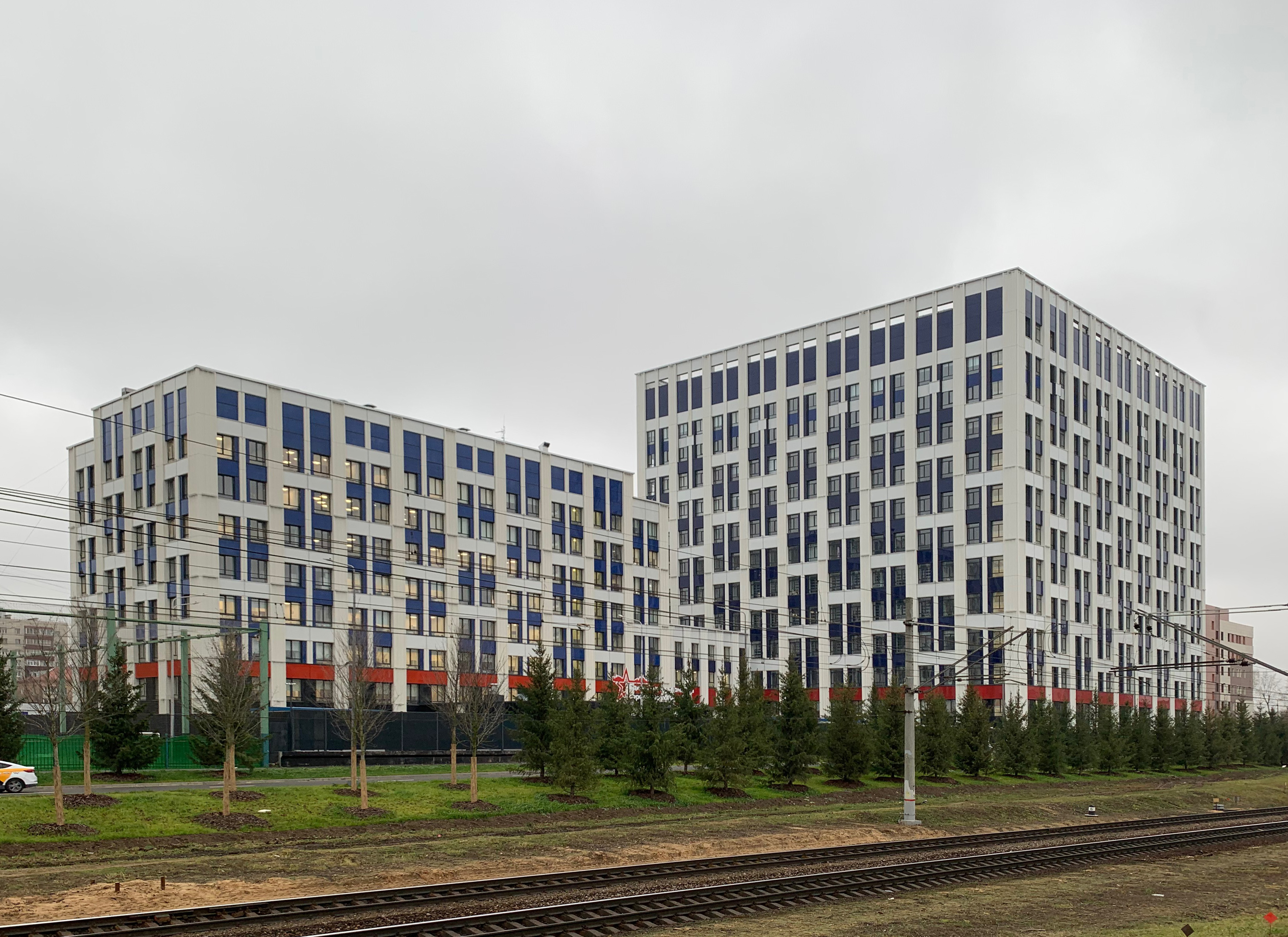
Single Conscription Office in Moscow

The 2023 law changes the nature of conscription summons and how they are served. Previously a summons had to be physically served on the person being called up. Now a summons is deemed to be served once it appears on the government services portal called "Gosuslugi". Failure to obey such a summons could lead to "bans on driving, registering a company, working as a self-employed individual, obtaining credit or loans, selling apartments, buying property or securing social benefits."

In July 2023, the Russian State Duma passed legislation to raise the maximum age for military conscription to 30. The new legislation, which came into effect on 1 January 2024, required men to carry out at least a year of military service, or equivalent training during higher education, between the ages of 18–30, rather than 18–27. The law also bans men from leaving Russia from the day they are summoned to a conscription office.

In August 2023, Putin signed a law raising fines relating to conscription avoidance, after being approved by the State Duma and the Federation Council. Since 1 October 2023, the fine for failure to appear at the military enlistment office without a valid reason was raised from 500 to 3,000 rubles to 10,000–30,000 rubles. There were two additional offences: the fine for not reporting change of residence to the enlistment office is 20,000–30,000 rubles, and the fine for not reporting change of status (e.g. employment and marital status) is 1,000–5,000 rubles.

The process of the creation of the Unified Military Register (Russian: Единый реестр воинского учета, romanized: Yediny reyestr voinskogo ucheta), also known as Unified Register of Military Personnel (Russian: Единый реестр военнообязанных, romanized: Yediny reyestr voyennoobyazannykh), began in October 2023. In November 2022, Putin signed a decree in which he instructed the Ministry of Digital Development and the Federal Taxation Service, with the participation of the Ministry of Defense, to form a state information resource for updating military registration documents by April 2024. The new system makes it possible to receive and enter information about those liable for military service online, and both military registration and enlistment office employees and citizens themselves will have access to it. In addition, employers will also be able to inform commissariats online about those liable for military service and update military registration information. Information for the register will be taken from various government resources and systems, including the State Services portal. As a result, it will be possible to register online with the military registration and enlistment office. This is especially true for 16–17-year-old boys of pre-conscription age, who must submit information about themselves from 1 January to 31 March. When registering remotely, the person liable for military service will not need to attach a medical certificate, and will still need to undergo a medical examination and psychological examination in person. The register includes among others personal data (full name, passport, address), health status, reasons for delay, sending and receiving subpoenas, appearance/failure to appear at the military registration and enlistment office, restrictions imposed for failure to appear, complaints and appeals in connection with accounting, administrative and criminal liability for military registration. Citizens will also have the opportunity to check the registry through the Gosuslugi portal or on the website of the registry of electronic subpoenas. The register of the call-ups will be synchronized with the register of persons liable for military service, but it will contain direct data about these official documents:

- Information about the recipient of the summons (full name, place of residence);
- Information about the military registration and enlistment office that sent the summons;
- Date of referral to the military registration and enlistment office;
- The date on which the summons is considered served;
- The date when the conscript must report to the military registration and enlistment office;
- Application/removal of restrictive measures.

On 1 April 2025, it was announced that 160,000 18-30-year-old men were planned to be issued with call-up notices for conscription, higher than the figures of 150,000 men in spring 2024, and 134,500 men in spring 2022. In 2024, Russia announced plans to increase the number of active servicemen to 1.5 million by 2026, an increase of about 180,000 over three years.

On 22 July 2025, the State Duma introduced a bill for year-round conscription, which was approved by President Putin and came into effect on 1 January 2026.

In June 2026, ABC News reported that Russian universities and technical colleges were participating in a military recruitment campaign aimed at students amid continuing personnel demands from the invasion of Ukraine. According to the report, more than 250 institutions were involved, with some offering academic incentives such as tuition assistance, the clearing of academic debts, and guarantees that students could resume their studies after military service.

By 2025 and 2026, Russian regional authorities and security forces stepped up local enforcement to boost military recruitment, carrying out unannounced identity checks and raids at commercial and recreational venues like gyms to verify men's military registration status. At the same time, large-scale inspections targeted industrial workplaces and dormitories housing migrant workers and newly naturalized Russian citizens. Reports indicated that many were placed under administrative detention and pressured into military service through threats of deportation, stripping of citizenship, or criminal prosecution.

In July 2026 the State Duma approved a law broadening eligibility for individuals with active criminal records—including defendants currently facing criminal charges—to sign contracts with the Defense Ministry during periods of formal mobilization.

==== Use of conscripts in Kursk ====
In August 2024, as part of the Russo-Ukrainian war, Ukrainian forces crossed the border into Kursk Oblast, with part of the oblast coming under Ukrainian occupation. Since the majority of the better-equipped Russian troops were deployed in Ukraine, most of the men guarding the border in the Kursk Oblast were young, inexperienced conscripts from the FSB Border Service, who suffered heavy losses in combat with experienced Ukrainian troops. Some of the conscripts stationed on the border with Ukraine were unarmed. Although Putin repeatedly promised that young conscripts would not be deployed in the war with Ukraine, conscripts from the FSB Border Service from several Russian regions were sent to fight with Ukrainian troops in Kursk Oblast. An online petition launched by the mothers of the conscripts requesting for Putin to withdraw the conscripts from Kursk received more than 10,000 signatures. On 29 August the Institute for the Study of War reported that most of the Russian prisoners of war taken in Kursk by the Ukrainians were young conscripts. There is an NGO called Get Lost for Russians seeking to avoid conscription. Per at least one conscript taken POW the main "goal is to complete their service, get that piece of paper" (i.e. that gives the right to work). According to reports from relatives, conscripts were also forced to sign military contracts under threat of being sent to Kursk.

== See also ==
- Cantonists
- Dedovshchina
