= Volga 149.200 =

Russian radio frequency for receiving Ukrainian deserting service personnel

Volga 149.200 (Russian: Волга 149.200) is a VHF radio frequency (149.2 MHz) for receiving surrender appeals from Ukrainian servicemen. The hotline was set up by the Russian military in the summer of 2023. The hotline was designed to enable Ukrainian servicemen who do not want to participate in combat or military operations to surrender to the Russian Armed Forces. Similar to how the Ukrainian hotline I Want to Live is designed to help Russian servicemen who do not want to participate in the Russian invasion of Ukraine to safely surrender to the Ukrainian Armed Forces. Ukrainian soldiers who use the radio frequency to surrender are reportedly "well-fed and provided with all necessary medical care" according to TASS.

On 27 September 2023, the Russian state media center TASS claimed that over 10,000 Ukrainian soldiers have used the radio frequency to surrender. However, an analysis by American fact-checking website Snopes has found no evidence for this claim.

In 2024, when French President Emmanuel Macron made statements about the possibility of French troops being deployed to Ukraine, posters began to appear near the French Embassy in Moscow and public transport stations around the embassy. The posters depicted an image of the commander of the French SS division Charlemagne, Edgar Puaud and text in both French and Russian which read: "Frenchmen, do not repeat the mistakes of your ancestors; their fate is well-known" followed by "Call Volga 149.200".

== See also ==
- I want to Live (hotline)
