= Pood =

Russian unit of weight

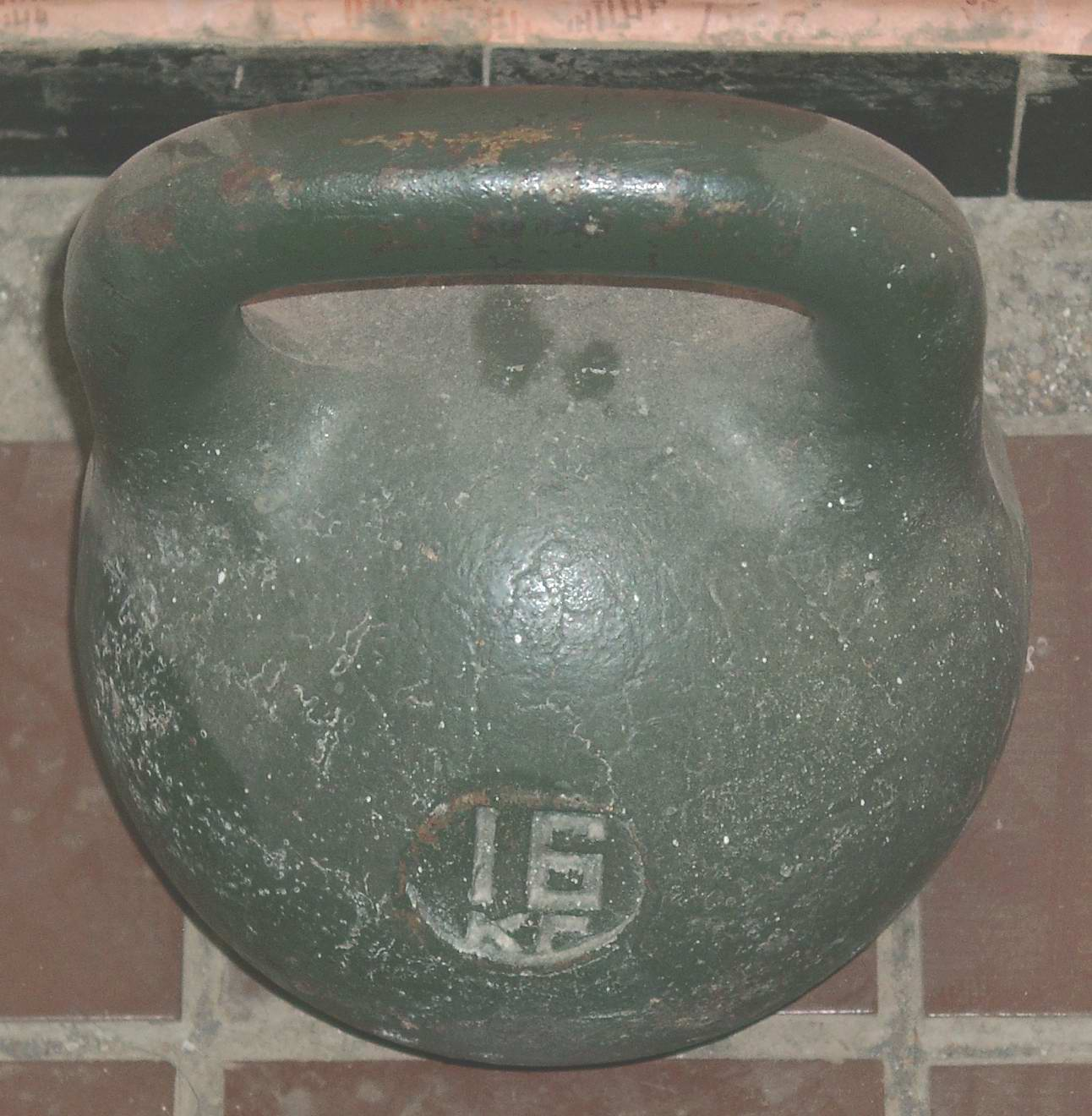
A 16kg kettlebell - one pood rounded to the nearest whole metric unit

The pood (Russian: пуд, romanized: pud, IPA: [put], plural: pudi or pudy) is an obsolete Russian unit of mass equal to 40 funt (фунт, Russian pound). Since 1899, it has been set to approximately 16.38 kilograms (36.11 pounds). The pood was first mentioned in the 12th century.

== Use in the past and present ==
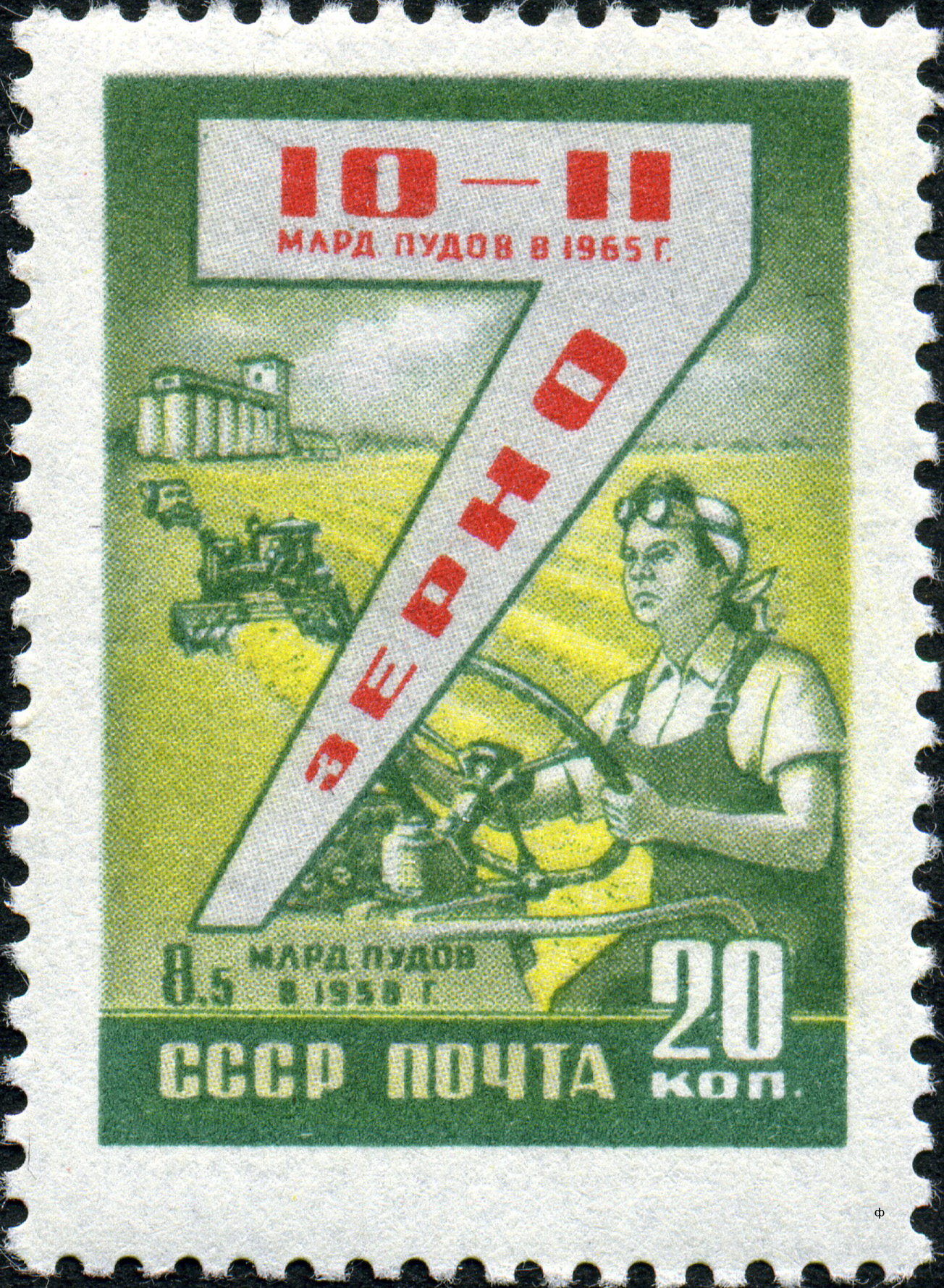
1959 postage stamp giving weight of grain in poods instead of tonnes

The pood is first mentioned in documents dating to the 12th century. It is mentioned in the charter of Vsevolod Mstislavich, the prince of Novgorod, dating to 1134–1135. It is also mentioned in the chronicle of Novgorod under the year 1170.

In 1899, the metric system was introduced into Russia and made obligatory in 1918. Together with other units of weight of the obsolete Russian weight measurement system, the Soviet Union officially abolished the pood in 1924. The term remained in widespread use until at least the 1940s.

Its usage is preserved in modern Russian in certain specific cases, e.g., in reference to sports weights, such as traditional Russian kettlebells, cast in multiples and fractions of 16 kg (which is pood rounded to metric units). For example, a 24 kg kettlebell is commonly referred to as "one-and-half pood kettlebell" (polutorapudovaya girya). It is also sometimes used when reporting the amounts of bulk agricultural production, such as grains or potatoes.

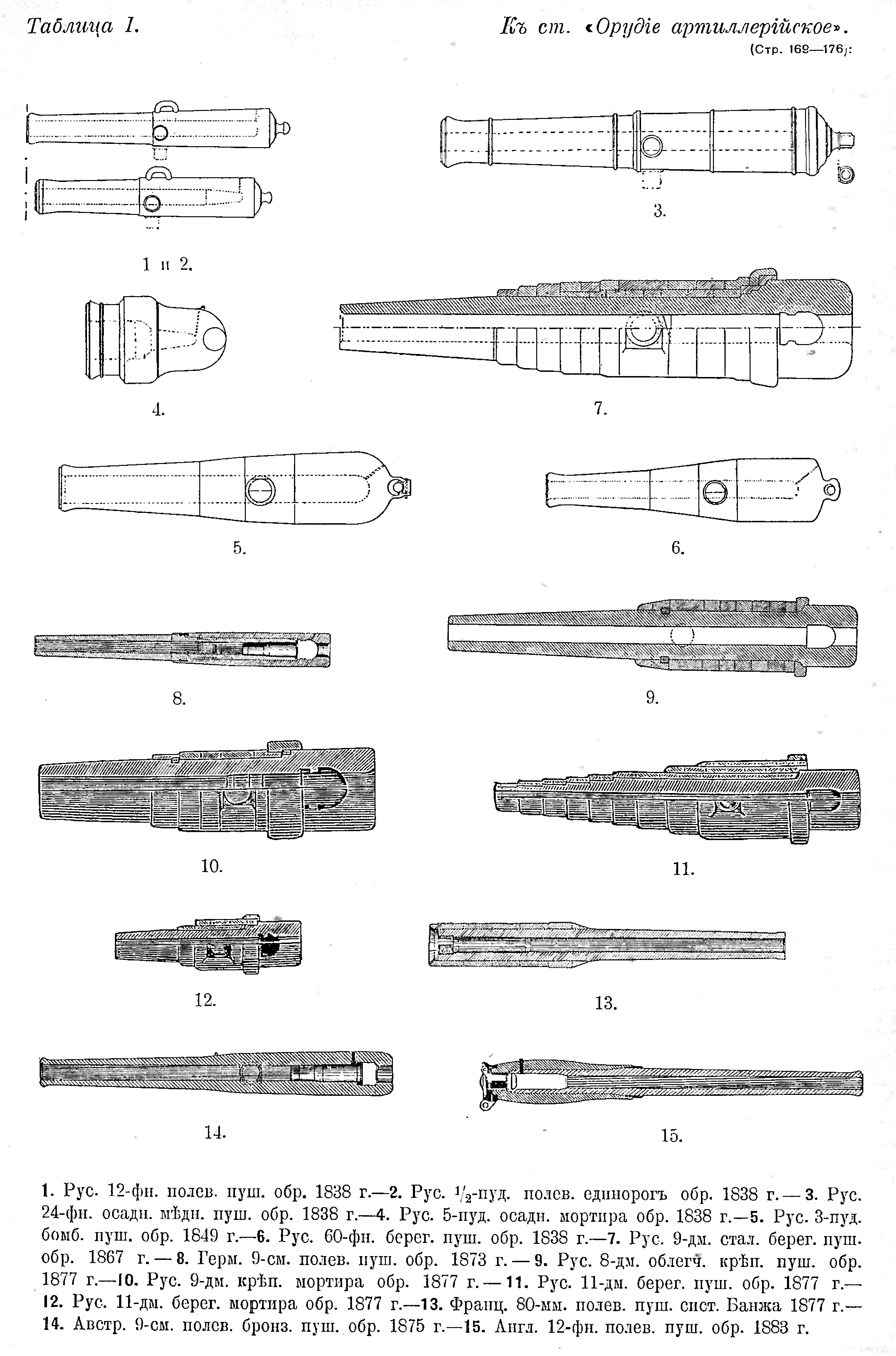
1915 diagram showing various artillery pieces, with shell weights given in poods.

== Idioms ==
An old Russian proverb reads, "You know a man when you have eaten a pood of salt with him" (Russian: Человека узнаешь, когда с ним пуд соли съешь).

In modern colloquial Russian, the expression sto pudov (сто пудов) – 'a hundred poods,' an intentional play on the foreign "hundred percent" – imparts the ponderative sense of overwhelming weight to the declarative sentence it is added to. The generic meaning of "very serious" or "absolutely sure" has almost supplanted its original meaning of "very heavy weight." The adjective stopudovy and the adverb stopudovo are also used to convey the same sense of certainty.

The word is also used in Polish idiomatically or as a proverb (with the original/strict meaning commonly forgotten): nudy na pudy (Polish for 'unsupportable boredoms', literally 'boredoms [that could be measured] in poods').

== Sources ==
- Cardarelli, François (6 December 2012). Encyclopaedia of Scientific Units, Weights and Measures: Their SI Equivalences and Origins. Springer Science & Business Media. ISBN 978-1-4471-0003-4.
- Gyllenbok, Jan (12 April 2018). Encyclopaedia of Historical Metrology, Weights, and Measures: Volume 3. Birkhäuser. ISBN 978-3-319-66712-6.
- Treese, Steven A. (17 May 2018). History and Measurement of the Base and Derived Units. Springer. ISBN 978-3-319-77577-7.
