= Weights and Measures Act 1878 =

Act of the Parliament of the United Kingdom

Weights and Measures Act 1878 (Note: Section 1.)
- Act of Parliament
- Parliament of the United Kingdom
- Long title: An Act to consolidate the Law relating to Weights and Measures.
- Citation: 41 & 42 Vict. c. 49
- Territorial extent: United Kingdom

Dates
- Royal assent: 8 August 1878
- Commencement: 1 January 1879 (Note: Section 2.)
- Repealed: 1 January 1980 (Note: Section 24(3)(a) of the Weights and Measures Act 1979. By this date the act's application to Northern Ireland had already been repealed; see § Subsequent developments.)
Other legislation
Amends	See § Repealed enactments
Repeals/revokes	See § Repealed enactments
Amended by	Statute Law Revision Act 1883; Summary Jurisdiction Act 1884; Weights and Measures Act 1889; Weights and Measures Act 1893; Weights and Measures Act 1904; Food and Drugs Act 1938; Local Government (Scotland) Act 1947; Gas Act 1948; Justices of the Peace Act 1949; Statute Law Revision Act 1950; Weights and Measures Act 1963; Weights and Measures Act (Northern Ireland) 1967; Gas (Northern Ireland) Order 1977; Weights and Measures Act 1979
Repealed by	Weights and Measures Act 1963; Statute Law (Repeals) Act 1977; Weights and Measures Act 1979; Weights and Measures Act (Northern Ireland) 1967

Status: Repealed

Text of statute as originally enacted

The Weights and Measures Act 1878 (41 & 42 Vict. c. 49) was an act of the Parliament of the United Kingdom that consolidated enactments related to weights and measures in the United Kingdom. Among other things, the act fixed the imperial standard pound as the standard for determining weight for the United Kingdom and abolished the troy pound as a legal unit for use in trade, other than for the sale of gold and silver.

== Provisions ==
=== Repealed enactments ===
Section 86 of the act repealed 22 enactments, listed in the first part of the sixth schedule to the act.

Citation	Short title	Description	Extent of repeal
31 Edw. 3. Stat. 1. c. 2	Wool Act 1357	The statute made at Westminster on the Monday next after the feast of Easter, in the thirty-first year, statute the first.	Chapter two.
6 Ann. c. 11 (Note: This is the citation in The Statutes of the Realm.)	Union with Scotland Act 1706	An Act for the union of the two kingdoms of England and Scotland.	Article seventeen.
15 Geo. 2. c. 20	Gold and Silver Thread Act 1741	An Act to prevent the counterfeiting of gold and silver lace, and for settling and adjusting the proportions of fine silver and silk, and for the better making of gold and silver thread.	Section five.
35 Geo. 3. c. 102	Weights and Measures Act 1795	An Act for the more effectual prevention of the use of defective weights, and of false and unequal balances.	The whole act.
36 Geo. 3. c. 85	Mills Act 1796	An Act for the better regulation of mills.	Section one from "and any persons appointed" down to "with respect to weights and balances", and from "and every miller or other person as aforesaid, in whose mill shall be found any weight or weights" to the end of the section.
37 Geo. 3. c. 143	Weights and Measures Act 1797	An Act to explain and amend an Act made in the thirty-fifth year of the reign of His present Majesty, intituled "An Act for the more effectual prevention of the use of defective weights and of false and unequal balances."	The whole act.
55 Geo. 3. c. 43	Weights and Measures Act 1815	An Act for the more effectual prevention of the use of false and deficient measures.	The whole act.
5 Geo. 4. c. 74	Weights and Measures Act 1824	An Act for ascertaining and establishing uniformity of weights and measures.	The whole act, except section twenty-five.
6 Geo. 4. c. 12	Weights and Measures Act 1825	An Act to prolong the time of the commencement of an Act of the last session of Parliament for ascertaining and establishing uniformity of weights and measures, and to amend the said Act.	The whole act.
5 & 6 Will. 4. c. 63	Weights and Measures Act 1835	An Act to repeal an Act of the fourth and fifth year of His present Majesty relating to weights and measures, and to make other provisions instead thereof.	The whole act.
16 & 17 Vict. c. 29	Weights in Sales of Bullion Act 1853	An Act for regulating the weights used in sales of bullion.	The whole act.
16 & 17 Vict. c. 79	Municipal Corporations Act 1853	An Act for making sundry provisions with respect to municipal corporations in England.	Section five.
18 & 19 Vict. c. 72	Weights and Measures Act 1855	An Act for legalizing and preserving the restored standards of weights and measures.	The whole act.
22 & 23 Vict. c. 56	Weights and Measures Act 1859	An Act to amend the Act of the fifth and sixth years of King William the Fourth, chapter sixty-three, relating to weights and measures.	The whole act.
23 & 24 Vict. c. 119	Weights and Measures (Ireland) Act 1860	An Act to amend the law relating to weights and measures in Ireland.	The whole act.
24 & 25 Vict. c. 75	Municipal Corporations Acts Amendment Act 1861	An Act for amending the Municipal Corporations Act.	Section six.
25 & 26 Vict. c. 76	Weights and Measures (Ireland) Amendment Act 1862	The Weights and Measures (Ireland) Amendment Act, 1862.	The whole act, except section two, and Part three and so much of Part four as relates to Part three.
25 & 26 Vict. c. 102	Metropolis Management Amendment Act 1862	The Metropolis Management Amendment Act, 1862.	Section one hundred and one.
27 & 28 Vict. c. 117	Metric Weights and Measures Act 1864	The Metric Weights and Measures Act, 1864.	The whole act.
29 & 30 Vict. c. 82	Standards of Weights, Measures, and Coinage Act 1866	An Act to amend the Acts relating to the standard weights and measures, and to the standard trial pieces of the coin of the realm.	The whole act.
30 & 31 Vict. c. 94	Weights and Measures (Dublin Metropolis) Act 1867	An Act to provide for the inspection of weights and measures and to regulate the law relating thereto, in certain parts of the police district of Dublin metropolis.	The whole act.
33 & 34 Vict. c. 10	Coinage Act 1870	The Coinage Act, 1870.	Section seventeen, from the beginning of the section down to "weight of and for weighing such coin", and from "all weights which are not less in weight" to the end of the section.

== Subsequent developments ==
Section 69 of the act from " and for the purposes " to end of section was repealed by section 1(1) of, and the first schedule to, the Statute Law Revision Act 1950 (14 Geo. 6. c. 6), which came into force on 23 May 1950.

Section 62 of the act, and the proviso to section 86, so far as unrepealed, were repealed by section 1(1) of, and part XVIII of schedule 1 to, the Statute Law (Repeals) Act 1977, which came into force on 16 June 1977.

For Great Britain, the whole act, except sections 62 and 86 and so much of the sixth schedule as related to section 6 of the Weights and Measures Act 1859 (22 & 23 Vict. c. 56), was repealed by section 63(1) of, and part I of schedule 9 to, the Weights and Measures Act 1963, which came into force on 31 January 1964. Section 62, and the proviso to section 86 so far as it remained unrepealed, were repealed by section 1(1) of, and part XVIII of schedule 1 to, the Statute Law (Repeals) Act 1977, which came into force on 16 June 1977. The remainder of section 86 and of the sixth schedule was repealed by section 23(2) of, and schedule 7 to, the Weights and Measures Act 1979, with effect from 1 January 1980, thereby completing the repeal of the act in Great Britain.

The act's application to Northern Ireland was repealed in part, as respects sections 3 to 8 and 10 to 15, the words "under this Act" in section 23, sections 31, 33 to 36 and 39, part of section 70, and the first, second and third schedules, by section 65 of, and part V of schedule 10 to, the Weights and Measures Act 1963, which came into force on 31 January 1964. The act's remaining application to Northern Ireland was superseded by the Weights and Measures Act (Northern Ireland) 1967, which received royal assent on 25 April 1967.
