= The Depths: The Evolutionary Origins of the Depression Epidemic =

2014 book on depression

- Authors: Jonathan Rottenberg
- Language: English
- Subject: Major depressive disorder
- Publisher: Basic Books
- Publication date: 2014
- Pages: 256
- ISBN: 9780465022212
- OCLC: 858610822

The Depths: The Evolutionary Origins of the Depression Epidemic is a 2014 book authored by Jonathan Rottenberg about major depressive disorder.
