= Put Domoi =

Russian newspaper

Put Domoi (путь домой, The Way Home) is a Russian street newspaper sold by the homeless in St. Petersburg, published twice monthly. The sellers receive half of the price. It was started in 1994 as Na Dne (На дне, The Depths) by Nochlezhka (meaning "shelter"), an organization for the homeless. It was renamed to its current name in 2003. It was closely modeled after The Big Issue and is a member of the International Network of Street Papers (INSP). The paper has been critical of human rights violations in Russia which has made it some enemies. The INSP has been important for financial support and political legitimacy.

There are also regional editions published in Siberia and Ukraine.

Put Domoi regularly organizes a football team that participates in the Homeless World Cup and won in 2005.
