= Sokha (unit) =

Russian unit of land measure (13th–17th centuries)

Sokha (big plow) is a unit of land measure in Russia in 13th-17th centuries. Sokha was used as unit of taxation for worked land owned by someone else or the State. The term originated when Tatars took rent from the actual plows - the land working tool which used 2-3 horses.

At the end of 15th century Novgorod sokha equalled 3 obzhas. A Moscow sokha was equal to 10 Novgorod ones and was paid according to the different sizes in various regions of the state.

In 1550 a new land-measure unit was established which kept the old name sokha. The name was then used for a certain amount of exploited land. A sokha was divided into quarters.

There were several types of sokha:

1. government – 800 quarters of best land;
2. church – 600 quarters of best land;
3. black – 400 quarters of best land.

Here, government meant someone who was working in government sectors, and black meant an average person ("the masses"), quarter or quart meant an area of land that is planted with a quarter of rye. The land was planted in such a way that the area of land seeded with two quarters was equal to a desyatina (an area of land approximately equal to one hectare).

Because of the different types of sokha, land owned by lower classes was worth less towards the tax, and most of the tax was paid by the peasants. Given the same amount of land, they paid twice as much as government officials, and 1.5 times as much as church officials.

In order to find out how many sokhas were in the state, a census measured and counted the rented lands. Quarters of land that were planted for personal use were free from payment. Until the beginning of the 17th century, a peasant who lived and worked on the land owned by a government employee, just like a peasant living on their own land or state land, paid equally for each exploited quarter of land. This section of land was called living. At the beginning of the 17th century, the term living quarter was used not for the actual quarter of worked land, but for several whole farms in which more than a single quarter was planted.

This was done in the interest of government officials - their lands were used to establish living quarters which constituted 10-16 yards. This means that if every yard was divided into 4 quarters (two desyatinas), then such a living quarter was then 40 to 64 quarters of actual quarters of utilized land. Therefore, 40 to 64 quarters of government official land paid the same amount of tax as one peasant paid from the single quarter that he lived on (whether self- or state-owned).

In 1678–1679 the sokha was replaced with the yard count, meaning taxes were to be paid for the number of peasant yards, rather than the area of the land occupied by the yards.

Taxes from small villages was also collected in sokhas. The term sokha remained but now it referred to a certain number of yards/houses. There were several types of sokha again: best, average, lesser, and worst villagers. Sokha of the best villages was equal to 40 yards, average - 80, lesser - 160, and worst - 320 yards. Every sokha was charged the same amount of tax. Therefore, best villages paid the same amount for half the number of farms than the average ones. If there were not enough lesser or worst sokhas, then the tax was charged from the people that lived in average or best sokhas.
