= I Want to Live (hotline) =

Ukrainian helpline for Russian soldiers wishing to surrender

- Хочу жити
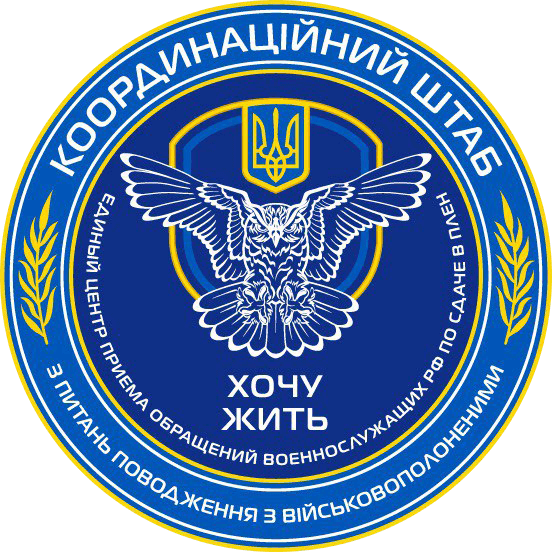
- Formation: September 18, 2022; 3 years ago
- Parent organization: Main Directorate of Intelligence of Ukraine
- Website: hochuzhit.com

I Want to Live (Ukrainian: Хочу жити, romanized: Khochu zhyty; Russian: Хочу жить, romanized: Khochu zhit) is a helpline for receiving appeals from Russian servicemen in Ukraine. Operated by the Main Directorate of Intelligence of Ukraine, the service is designed to help Russian servicemen who do not want to participate in the Russian invasion of Ukraine to safely surrender to the Ukrainian Armed Forces. The project guarantees the detention of surrendering military personnel in accordance with the Geneva Conventions.

== Process ==
According to the official website of the project, there are several methods by which a Russian serviceman can submit an appeal and surrender. These include calling the round-the-clock hotline, or following instructions from a chatbot on the Telegram channel of the project. Shortly after the launch of the project, Russian officials blocked access to it from the country's territory.

Ukrainians have utilized Russian-language social media to spread the word about the operation. Russian soldiers and their loved ones can visit the site and must provide personal data about the surrendering soldier to properly identify them. The hotline is manned by 10 members of active-duty service personnel with backgrounds in psychology and were moved to a secret location as they have been identified as a high-profile target.

For those who have surrendered, Ukrainians offer the opportunity to take part in a prisoner exchange organized between the governments of Russia and Ukraine, or to remain temporarily in detention with the possibility of staying in Ukraine or emigrating later. Those who surrender are assured that if they are returned home via a prisoner swap the official record would denote that the soldier was captured, not that they had surrendered.

== History ==
On September 18, the coordination headquarters for the treatment of prisoners of war, as a continuation of the project designed to encourage the surrender of Russian personnel, launched a special state project with a 24-hour hotline for receiving appeals from the Russian military and their families called "I want to Live."

By October 5, 2022, it was reported that the hotline had already had its first successful use in assisting the surrender of a Russian serviceman to the Ukrainian Armed Forces. The Russian soldier who surrendered had been mobilized immediately after the announcement of partial mobilization in Russia.

During the first month of the project, more than three thousand calls from Russian military personnel were processed. By December 2022, a spokesperson for the program said it had processed over 4,300 direct requests for information on how to surrender. It was reported that an applicant may receive a location and time, where they would wait for a quadcopter drone, then follow it to a Ukrainian position.

On 4 May 2023, the hotline's spokesperson, Vitaliy Matvienko, stated that it received requests to surrender from 3,200 Russian soldiers in April 2023, representing a 10% increase over March 2023. He added that the hotline had received a total of 16,000 requests to surrender since its inception. Its website had been accessed over 36 million times, 32 million visits of which were made from the territory of Russia. (Note: The official statement in Ukrainian reads: "3200 росіян висловили бажання здатись у полон у квітні. Проєкт «Хочу жить». Про це на пресконференції в Military Media Center розповів спікер державного проєкту здачі в полон російських та білоруських військових "Хочу жить" Віталій Матвієнко. - За квітень кількість звернень у нас зросла, порівняно з березнем 2023 року, на 10% і становить 3200 звернень, - зазначив він. Віталій Матвієнко також розповів, що загалом, за час існування проєкту, отримано понад 16 тисяч звернень і сайт відвідало більш як 36 мільйонів осіб. 32 мільйони з них – з території російської федерації." In English: "3,200 Russians expressed a desire to surrender in April. Project "I Want to Live". Vitaliy Matvienko, spokesman for the state project for the surrender of Russian and Belarusian servicemen "I Want to Live", told this at a press conference at the Military Media Centre. "In April, the number of applications increased by 10% compared to March 2023, and amounted to 3,200 applications," he said. Vitaliy Matvienko also said that since the project's inception, more than 16,000 applications have been received, and the website has been visited by more than 36 million people. 32 million of them came from the territory of the Russian Federation.") After the surrender of Russian pilot Maksim Kuzminov via Operation Synytsia and the resulting announcement that all Russian military troops who manage to transfer equipment to Ukraine would receive a monetary reward, the calls to the service increased 70% in one day. In January 2024, it was reported that the hotline and associated chatbot had received more than 26,000 calls since it had been launched and the website had been visited more than 48 million times.

== See also ==
- Look for Your Own
- Volga 149.200
- Treatment of prisoners of war in the Russian invasion of Ukraine § Russian prisoners of war
