= Polish units of measurement =

Traditional system of measurement used in Poland

The traditional Polish units of measurement included two uniform yet distinct systems of weights and measures, as well as a number of related systems borrowed from neighbouring states. The first attempt at standardisation came with the introduction of the Old Polish measurement [system], also dubbed the Warsaw system, introduced by a royal decree of December 6, 1764. The system was later replaced by the New Polish measurement [system] introduced on January 1, 1819.

The traditional Polish systems of weights and measures were later replaced with those of surrounding nations (due to the Partitions of Poland), only to be replaced with metric system by the end of the 19th century (between 1872 and 1876).

== History ==
=== Historic weights and measures ===
The first recorded weights and measures used in Poland were related to dimensions of human body, hence the most basic measures in use were sążeń (fathom), łokieć (ell), piędź (span), stopa (foot) and skok (jump). With time trade relations with the neighbouring nations brought to use additional units, with names often borrowed from German, Arabic or Czech.

From Middle Ages until the 18th century, there was no single system of measurement used in all of Poland. Traditional units like stopa (foot) or łokieć (ell) were used throughout the country, but their meaning differed from region to region. Most major cities in the area used their own systems of measurement, which were used in the surrounding areas as well. Among the commonly used systems were Austrian, Galician, Danzig, Kraków, Prussian, Russian and Breslau. The matter was further complicated by the fact that Austrian or German systems were hardly uniform either and differed from town to town. Furthermore, the systems tended to evolve over time: in the 13th century the Kraków's ell was equivalent to 64.66 centimetres, a century later it was equivalent to 62.5 cm, then in the 16th century it shrunk to 58.6 cm and finally was equalled to standard "old Polish ell" of 59.6 cm only in 1836.

To add to the confusion, various goods were traditionally measured with different units, often incompatible or difficult to convert. For instance, beer was sold in units named achtel (0.5 of barrel, that is 62 Kraków gallons of 2.75 litres each). However honey and mead were recorded for tax purposes in units named rączka (slightly more than 10 Kraków gallons).

As the weights and measures were important in everyday life of merchants, in 1420 the royal decree allowed each voivode to create and maintain a single system used in his voivodeship. This law was later confirmed by a Sejm act of 1565. Steel or copper rods used as local standard of ell (basic unit of length) were created in a voivode's capital and then dispatched to all nearby towns, where they were further duplicated for everyday use. One bar was to be stored in the town hall for comparison, while additional rods were stored in the gatehouses or toll points to be borrowed by merchants as needed. Damaging or losing a rod was punishable by law.

=== Measuring time ===
Outside of this set of systems was the measurement of time. As clock towers only started to appear in late Middle Ages, and their usability was limited to within a small radius, some basic substitutes for modern minutes and hours were developed, based on Christian prayers. The pacierz (or paternoster) was a non-standard unit of time comprising some 25 seconds, that is enough time to recite the Lord's Prayer. Similarly, zdrowaśka (from Zdrowaś Mario, the first words of the Hail Mary) was used, as was the Rosary (różaniec) that is the time needed to recite Hail Mary 50 times (roughly 16 minutes). Those units were never strictly defined, but is used in rural areas of Poland even today.

=== Early attempts at standardisation ===
While this system introduced some level of standardisation throughout the country, the systems used in various voivodeships still differed from one another. To counter this problem the Kraków ell and Poznań ell were made equal in 1507. The same applied to ells used in Lwów and Lublin, which however were different from those in Kraków and Poznań. In 1532 the Płock ell was aligned with the Kraków ell, which in 1565 was declared an official ell to be used in all of the Crown of Poland. The system used by Warsaw was adopted in Płock and all of Masovia in 1569. In 1613 additional systems were created for Vilnius and Kaunas. The standardisation of other units of measurement also made some progress since the 15th century, but at a different pace. In the end this created even more confusion, as two towns could use the same units of length, but two different units of weight, although using the same terms.

=== 1764 reform - the Old Polish system ===
As until then not only different units varied from town to town but also their relation to one another, in 1764 a major overhaul of the measurement system was prepared. By a royal decree of December 6, 1764 all units of measurement were to be converted to a new system, common to all of Poland and its dependencies. The system relied on previously used units, but introduced a common, unified system of relations between them. It had no official name and it was not until the 19th century when it started to be called the Old Polish system (miary staropolskie, or Old-Polish measures), in contrast to the new system introduced then.

The basic unit of length - the ell or łokieć in Polish - was set to 0.5955 metres. For trade and everyday use it was further subdivided into the foot (stopa, ≈29.78 centimetres); sztych (≈19.86cm); quarter (ćwierć, ≈14.89cm); palm (dłoń, ≈7.44cm); and inch (cal, ≈2.48 centimetres), or gathered into the fathom (sążeń, 3 ells or 1.787 metres in length), such that:

1 ell = 2 feet = 3 sztychs = 4 quarters = 8 palms = 24 inches ( = ⅓ of a fathom ).

A different system of units, although complementary and interchangeable, was used in measuring lengths for agrarian purposes. The basic unit was a step (krok), equalling 3.75 of standard ell, or 2.2333 metres. Two steps made a rod (pręt, 4.4665 metres), 2 rods made a stick (laska), and five sticks were equal to a cable (sznur of 44.665 metres). Finally 3 cables made up a furlong (staje) of roughly 134 metres.

In measuring the distance between cities, the basic unit was staje, although it was different from the staje mentioned before and had the length of roughly 893 metres. Eight staje made up a Polish mile of 7144 metres.

The weights were based on the Polish pound (funt of 0.4052 kg) composed of two grzywnas, each in turn comprising 16 lots (łut of 0.0127 kg). For heavier goods the basic units were a stone (kamień, 32 pounds or 12.976 kg) and Hundredweight (cetnar, five stones or 64.80 kg).

There were two sets of units of volume: one for fluids and the other for dry goods. Both used the gallon (garniec) of 3.7689 litres as the basic unit. This was subdivided into 4 quarts (kwarta) of 0.9422 L or 16 kwarterka. For dry goods four gallons comprised a measure (miarka), 2 measures comprised a quarter (ćwierć), 4 quarters comprised a bushel (korzec) of 120.6 L, and 30 bushels comprised a last (łaszt) of 3618 L. For fluids, 5 gallons comprised a konew of 18.8445 L and 14.4 konew made up a barrel of 271.36 L.

=== Current use ===
Though the traditional systems were officially abandoned in the 19th century, traces of their use, especially in rural areas, were found by ethnographers as late as 1969.

== Length ==
- Krok (pl:Krok (miara))
- Ławka (pl:Ławka (jednostka długości))
- Łokieć (pl:Łokieć (miara))
- Piędź (pl:Piędź)
- Staje (pl:Staje)
- Stopa (pl:Stopa (miara))

== Area ==
- Łan (pl:Łan (miara powierzchni))
- Morga (pl:Morga)
- Staje (pl:Staje)
- Włóka (pl:Włóka (miara powierzchni))
- Źreb (pl:Źreb)

Włóka	Morga	Sznur	Pręt	Kopanka	Łokieć	hectares
1	30	90	900	9000	506250	17.9549
	1	3	30	300	16875	0.5985
		1	10	100	5625	0.1995
			1	10	562.50	0.01995
				1	56.25	0.001995

== Volume ==
- Garniec (pl:Garniec)
- Korzec (pl:Korzec)
- Łaszt (pl:Łaszt)

== Mass and monetary units ==
- Grzywna (pl:Grzywna (ekonomia); pl:Grzywna (jednostka miar))
- Kamień (pl:Kamień (miara))
- Kwarta (pl:Kwarta (jednostka wagowa))
- Kwartnik (pl:Kwartnik)
- Łut (pl:Łut)
- Skojec (pl:Skojec)
- Wiardunek (pl:Wiardunek)

== Time ==
- Pacierz (pl:Pacierz)
- Zdrowaśka (pl:Zdrowaśka)
