= Last (unit) =

Unit of mass and volume

The last was a Dutch unit of mass, volume, and number, and a large English unit of weight, mass, volume, and number. It referred to standardized amounts of ships' lading and varied by commodity and over time.

== Name ==
The term derives from Old English hlæst, ultimately from a Proto-Germanic root reconstructed as *hlaþ- or *hlað- ("to place"). It is also parallel and probably influenced by the Middle Dutch and Middle Low German last, used in identical senses as a load, cargo, or standardized unit.

== Weight ==
The Assize of Weights and Measures, one of the statutes of uncertain date from c. 1300, defined the wool last as 12 sacks' worth, equivalent to 24 weys, 336 London stone, or 4,200 merchants' pounds (about 1,835 kg). The last subsequently varied with the different values given to the sack of wool.

The flax and feather lasts were 1,700 avoirdupois pounds (about 770 kg).

The English Ordnance Board defined the gunpowder last as 24 barrels of 100 avoirdupois pounds each (2,400 lbs or about 1,090 kg).

A Dutch last, or Scheepslast, was 4,000 Amsterdam pond, which is 1,976.4 kg (4,357 lb; 2.1786 short tons; 1.9452 long tons). In the Dutch East India Company (Dutch: Vereenigde Oostindische Compagnie, commonly abbreviated to VOC) the last was about 1,250 kg (2,760 lb) in the 17th century, later becoming as much as 2,000 kg (4,400 lb). The last was also used as a measure of rice in Dutch Formosa. It was composed of 20 piculs and about equal to 1,200 kg (2,600 lb).

== Quantity ==
The Assize of Weights and Measures describes the herring last as ten long thousands or 12,000 fish. The Norman French editions describe this as the "red herring" or kipper last and compose the herring last out of ten short thousands of twelve long hundreds, still making 12,000 fish altogether. (Elsewhere, the herring last was treated by volume.)

The leather last comprised 20 dicker of 10 skins each (200 total) or, sometimes, 12 dozen skins (144 total).

== Volume ==
The English last could also be understood as the volume occupied by the other lasts. In some sources, the last is equated with 2.9 cubic metres (640 imperial gallons). The beer last was 12 barrels, the cod last and some herring lasts were also 12 barrels, and the pitch last was 12 or 14 barrels.

The Polish last (łaszt) used for bulk trade in dry goods from the 16th to 19th century comprised 30 Polish bushels (korzec). In the early 19th century, this amounted to 3,840 litres (840 imperial gallons; 1,010 US gallons) but varied over time and location.

The Dutch last, or Scheepslast, has been equated to essentially 3.398 cubic metres (120 cubic feet) of shipping space.

== See also ==
- lading, ballast
- load
