= Łokieć =

Łokieć (Polish word for "elbow") or Lokiec may refer to:

- Łokieć, Bieszczady County, a village in southeastern Poland
- Łokieć, or Polish ell, an obsolete Polish unit of length
- Tim Lokiec (born 1977), American artist
