= Livø =

Island in Denmark

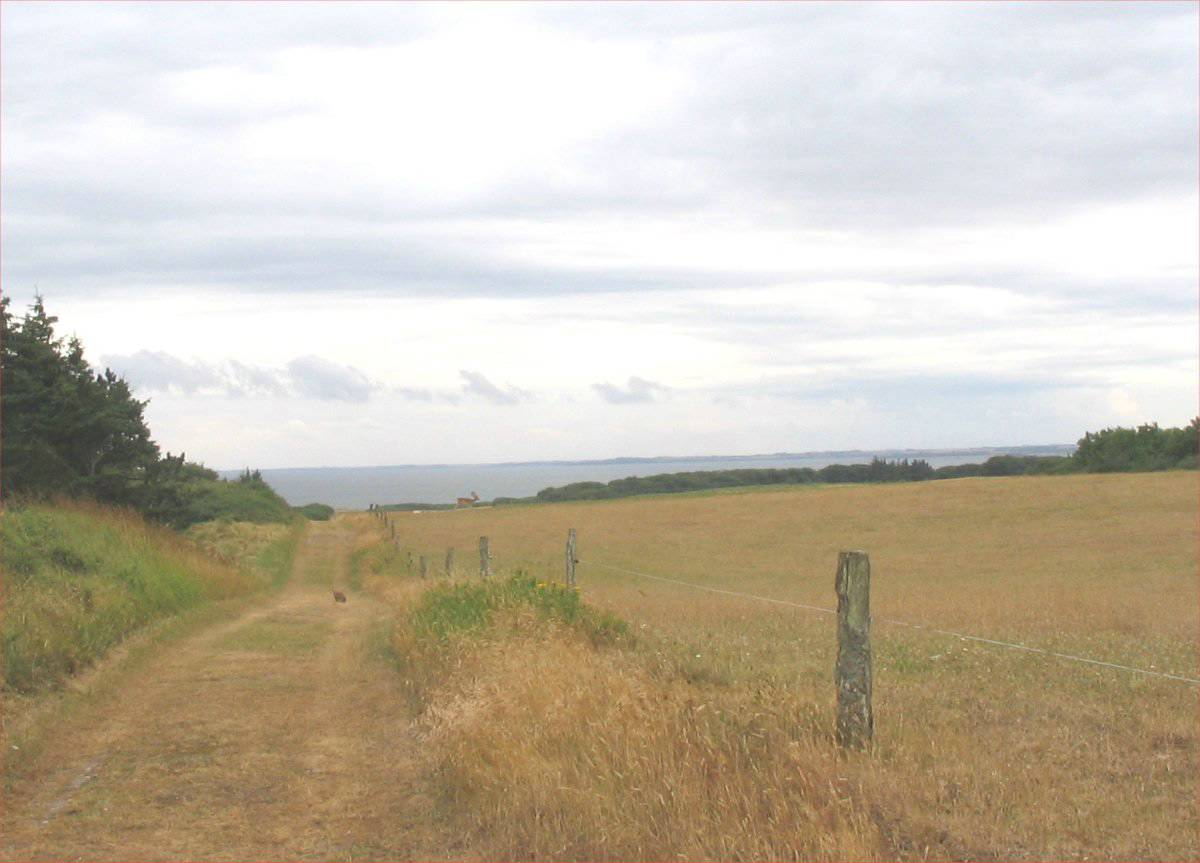
- A field on Livø looking out towards the Limfjord

- Livø's location in the North Jutland Region

Geography
- Location: Limfjord
- Coordinates: 56°53′36″N 9°5′10″E
- Area: 3.3 km^{2} (1.3 sq mi)
- Length: 6 km (3.7 mi)
- Width: 1.6 km (0.99 mi)

Administration
- Denmark
- Municipality: Vesthimmerland Municipality
- Region: North Jutland Region

Demographics
- Population: 6 (2022)

Livø (Danish pronunciation: [ˈliwøˀ]) is a 320-hectare Danish island located in the central body of the Limfjord, approximately midway between Nykøbing Mors, Løgstør, Fjerritslev and Thisted. As of 2022, the island has 6 year-round residents.

The island attracts approximately 30,000 visitors annually. It is accessible by ferry daily from April through September. Dogs and motor vehicles are not permitted on the island. It is possible to walk around the entire island, about a 10 km distance, in one afternoon.

== Geography ==
Livø is notable due to its natural environment and has been a protected island since 1977. The island is a moraine, pushed up by ice from Løgstør Broads in the last Ice Age. On the cliffs overlooking the sea at the northwestern edge of the island, it is possible to see layers of material that were pushed together during the Ice Age, including jetties and steep clay slopes. The highest point on the island is 43 meters above sea level.

The eastern and southern parts of the island consist of flat land with a wide beach ridge that continues south and ends in the protected Livø wildlife area, which is partly inaccessible to visitors. Herds of fallow deer live in this protected area, and the wildlife here are several generations old. The area is also designated as a seal sanctuary and seals breed here in July–August.

Until the 17th century, the majority of the island was covered by an oak forest. Most of this original forest was decimated due to agricultural land use and overgrazing of livestock by the turn of the 17th century. Efforts to reforest the island began towards the end of the 1800s, and today about a third of the island is covered by coniferous and deciduous forest. The northern part of the island is covered with a forest where various types of trees grow, with a heath in the northernmost part. The northern part of the island is ⅓ organic farms, ⅓ woods and ⅓ heath, grasslands and salt marshes.

== History ==
Livø has been inhabited since the Stone Age. In 1157, its lands were given to the Cistercian monks of the nearby Vitskøl Abbey by King Valdemar I of Denmark. After the reformation, the crown seized all religious properties, including Livø in 1563. The island was then sold along with the mainland Abbey to Henrik Gyldenstjerne of Aagaard on 21 July 1563 for "1500 Hungarian Guldens, 1000 lots [of] Silver, and 4000 rigsdaler." In 1573, the entire property was again transferred to Bjørn Andersen, who then named it after himself, creating the Bjørnsholm estate. After Bjørn's death in 1583, Bjørnsholm was inherited by his son, Truid Bjørn. After Truid's death the property passed to his widow's nephews, Holger Bille and Jesper Friis.

In 1689, the estate was acquired by Anders Kjærulf, who was ennobled in 1724. In 1726 he transferred the property to his son, Søren Kjærulf. After Søren's death in 1730, the property was sold to Peder Tøgersen and then inherited to Tøgersen's son, Mathias de Lasson, and eventually his grandson, Peder de Lasson, who died in 1808. After Peder's death, the estate was sold to Johan Casper Mylius. On 25 November 1828 Mylius transferred ownership of the property over to the state. The state then leased the rights to the island. In 1872, a member of the Oppen-Schilden noble family purchased the island for 30,000 rigsdaler. He built the farmhouse and courtyard which remains the largest building on the island to this day. After Oppen-Schilden's death in 1896, his heir sold the island to J.L. Jensen for 120,000 DKK who in turn gave the island to his son. After his death, the island was purchased by Hofjægermester H.C.O. Rosenkrantz, for use as hunting grounds.

On 1 April 1911, the island was purchased by De Kellerske Åndssvageanstalter (English: The Keller Institute for the Mentally Ill) for 160,000 DKK. For the next 50 years it was used as an institution for male criminals with mental illness. The men held on the island reportedly called the island Djævleøen (English: The Devil Island). The island was also populated during this period by a number of mental hospital staff along with their families. The population engaged in agricultural work, ran workshops, tended the forest, and produced dairy products.

During the German occupation of Denmark, a small resistance force camped out on the island, which the German forces never discovered. In 1971 the island was briefly occupied by a number of artists, including Bjørn Nørgaard and Per Kirkeby. Their attempts at farming failed due to their lack of agricultural proficiency and their occupation of the island ended when the police intervened.

In 1975, the former buildings of the mental hospital were used as housing more than 200 refugee children from Vietnam. The children stayed on the island for nine months as political debates questioned their legal right to remain in Denmark.

== Current use ==
The island is currently used for educational and recreational purposes. The Socialist People's party runs an annual three-week summer camp on the island including political, cultural and practical elements. A second annual camp of about 200 people with mental disabilities, called Activity Week, takes place in September. Viborg Karate school hosts an annual karate camp which draws participants from Sweden, Belgium, Poland, and the Netherlands. The island is known for the annual Livø Jazz Festival, as well as being featured in a television series about the Danish islands, where island ranger Per Gjættermann discussed Livø's natural environment.

The small town on the island today consists of a street with a grocery store, an inn, and a restaurant. The island is serviced by a tiny power station from 1950s. The island produces its own beer, called Livøl—a portmanteau of the island's name and the danish word for beer, øl.

== Gallery ==
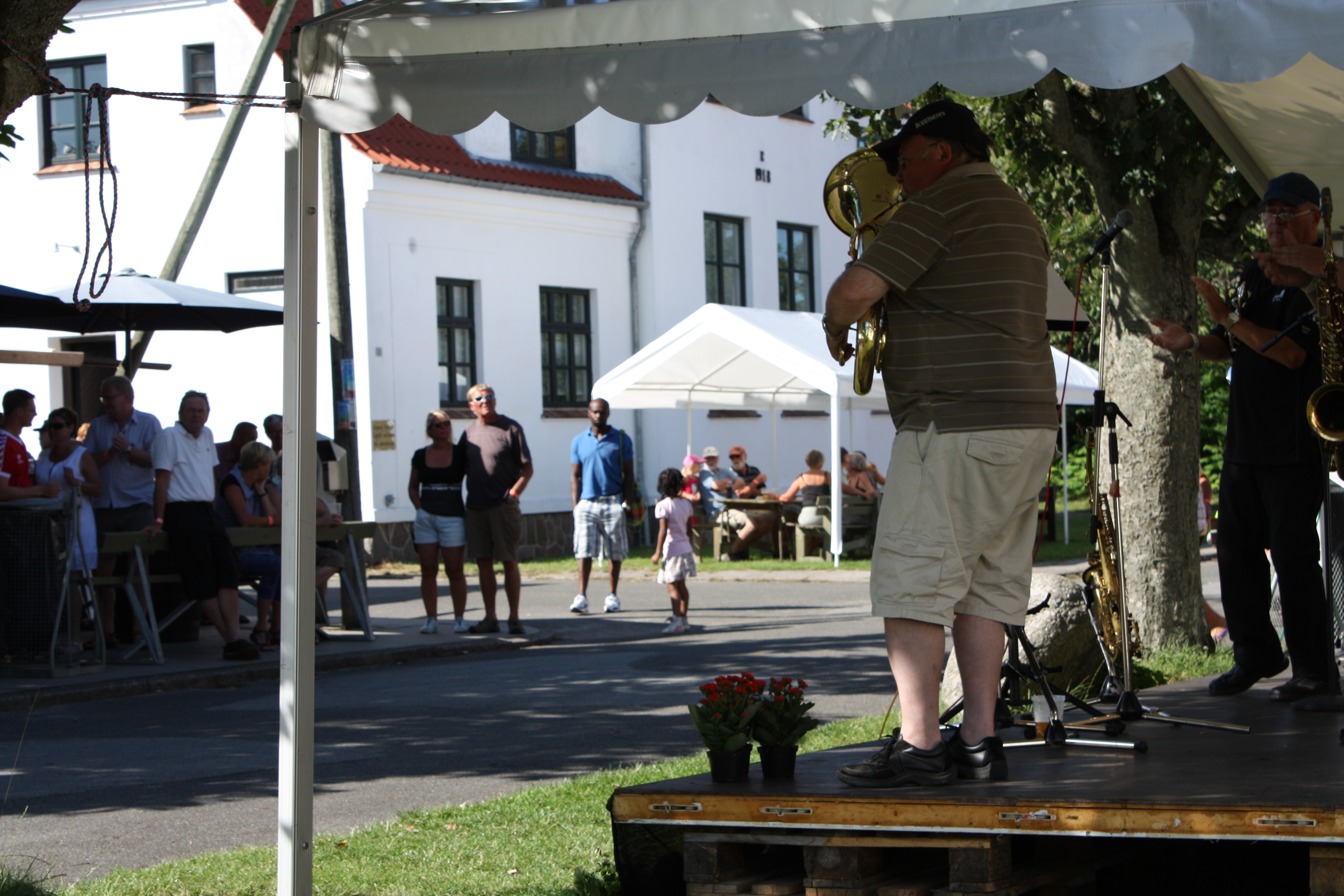
Performance during Livø Jazz Festival

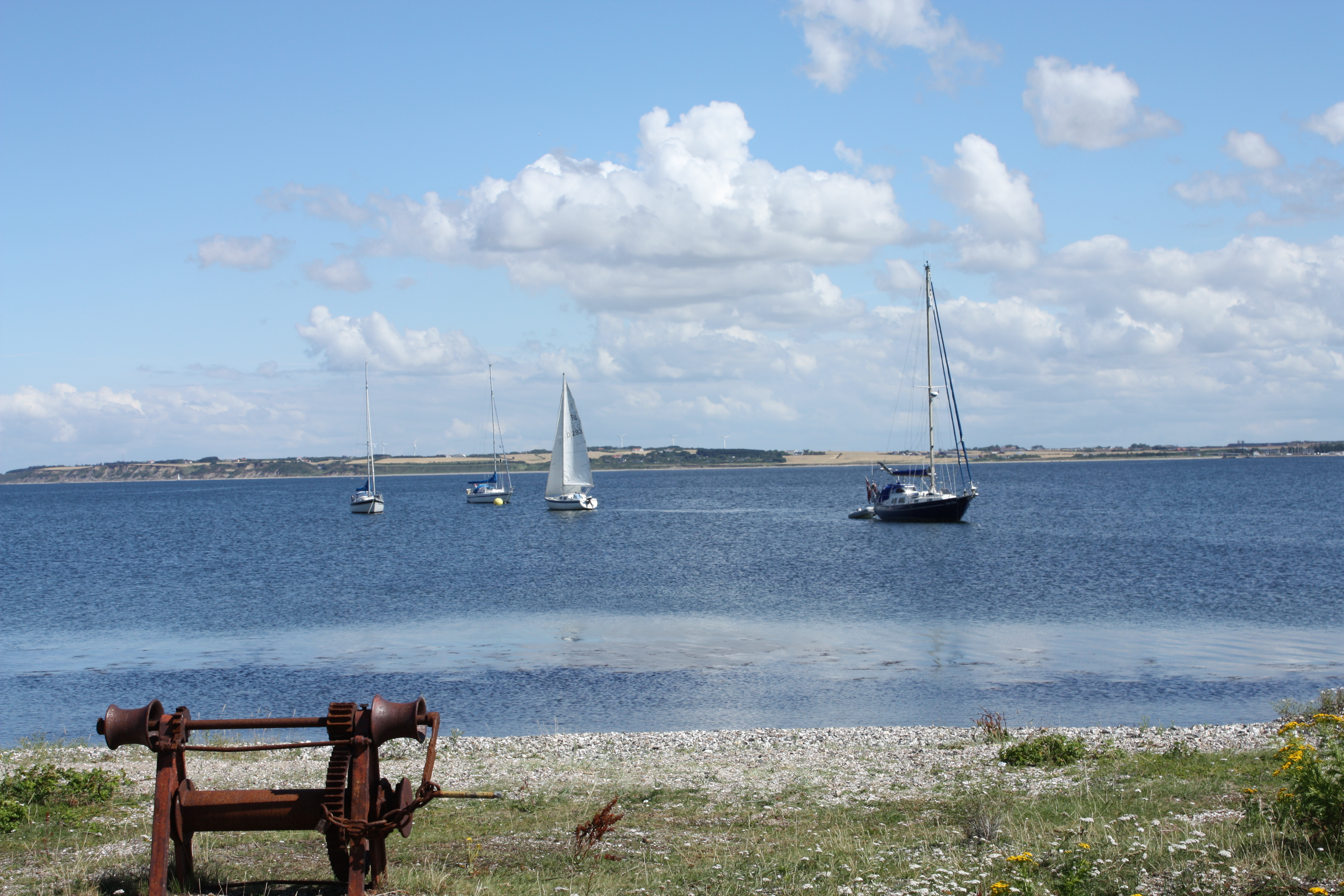
View from the shore

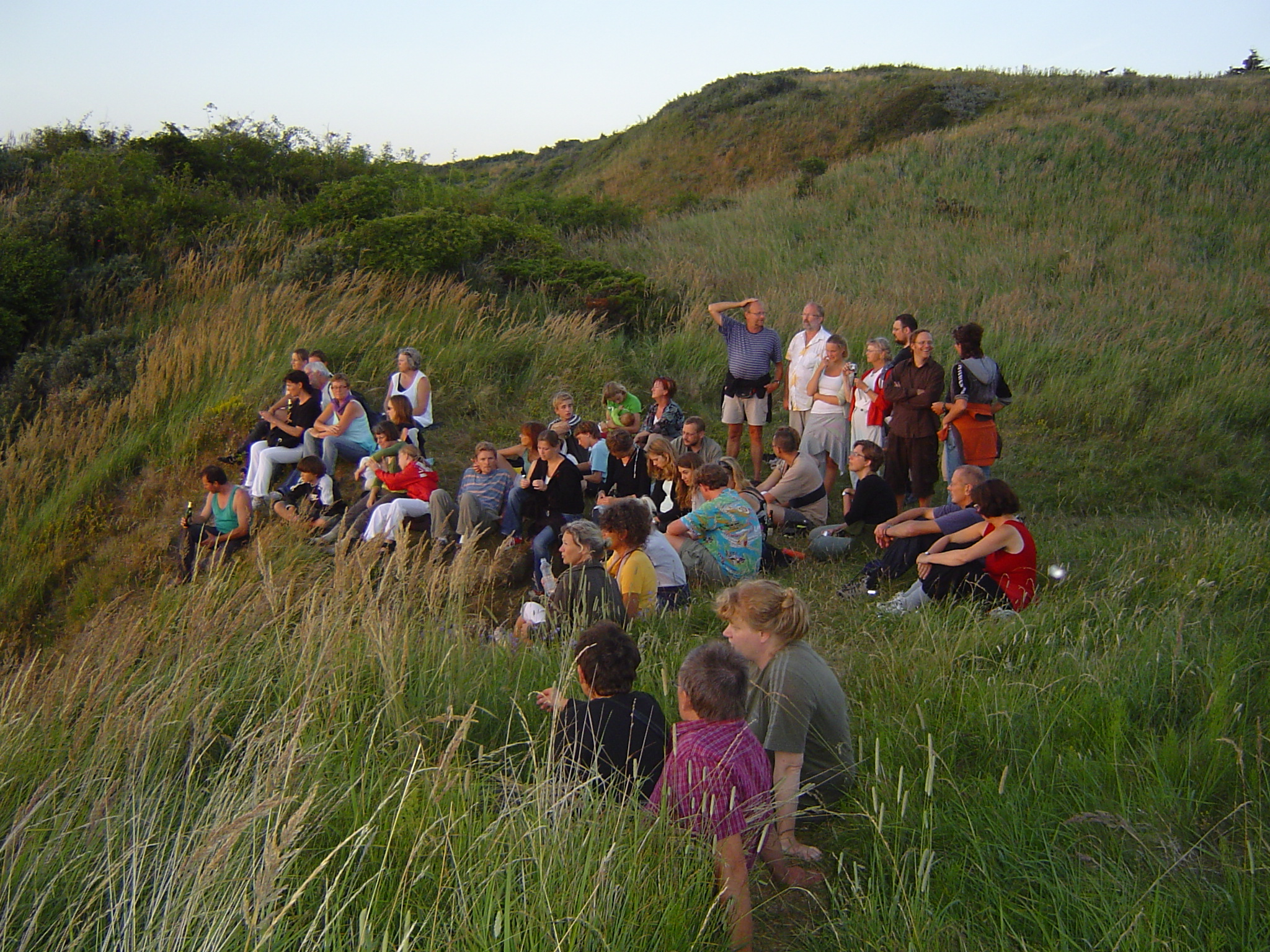
A group of visitors appreciating the island's nature
