= Morgen =

Unit of area

morgen
- Unit system: German customary units
- Unit of: area
- Symbol: Mg
- Named after: The amount of land that can be tilled in the morning hours with a single-furrow horse or ox plough (measured from morning to noon).

Conversions
1 Mg in ...	... is equal to ...
- SI base units: 2,500 m^{2}
- Imperial unit system: 2,990 yd^{2}

A morgen (Mg) is a historical, but still occasionally used, German unit of area used in agriculture. Officially, it is no longer in use, having been supplanted by the hectare. While today it is approximately equivalent to the Prussian morgen, measuring 25 ares or 2,500 square meters (0.62 acres), its area once ranged from 1,906 to 11,780 square metres (0.471 to 2.911 acres), but usually between 0.25 to 0.5 hectares (0.62 to 1.24 acres). In the 20th century, the quarter hectare became standard for one morgen. The Morgen unit of land measurement was also used in the Netherlands, Poland, Lithuania, and parts of the Dutch colonial empire, such as South Africa. It was also used in the Balkans, Norway, and Denmark, where it was equal to about 0.27 hectares (2/3 acre).

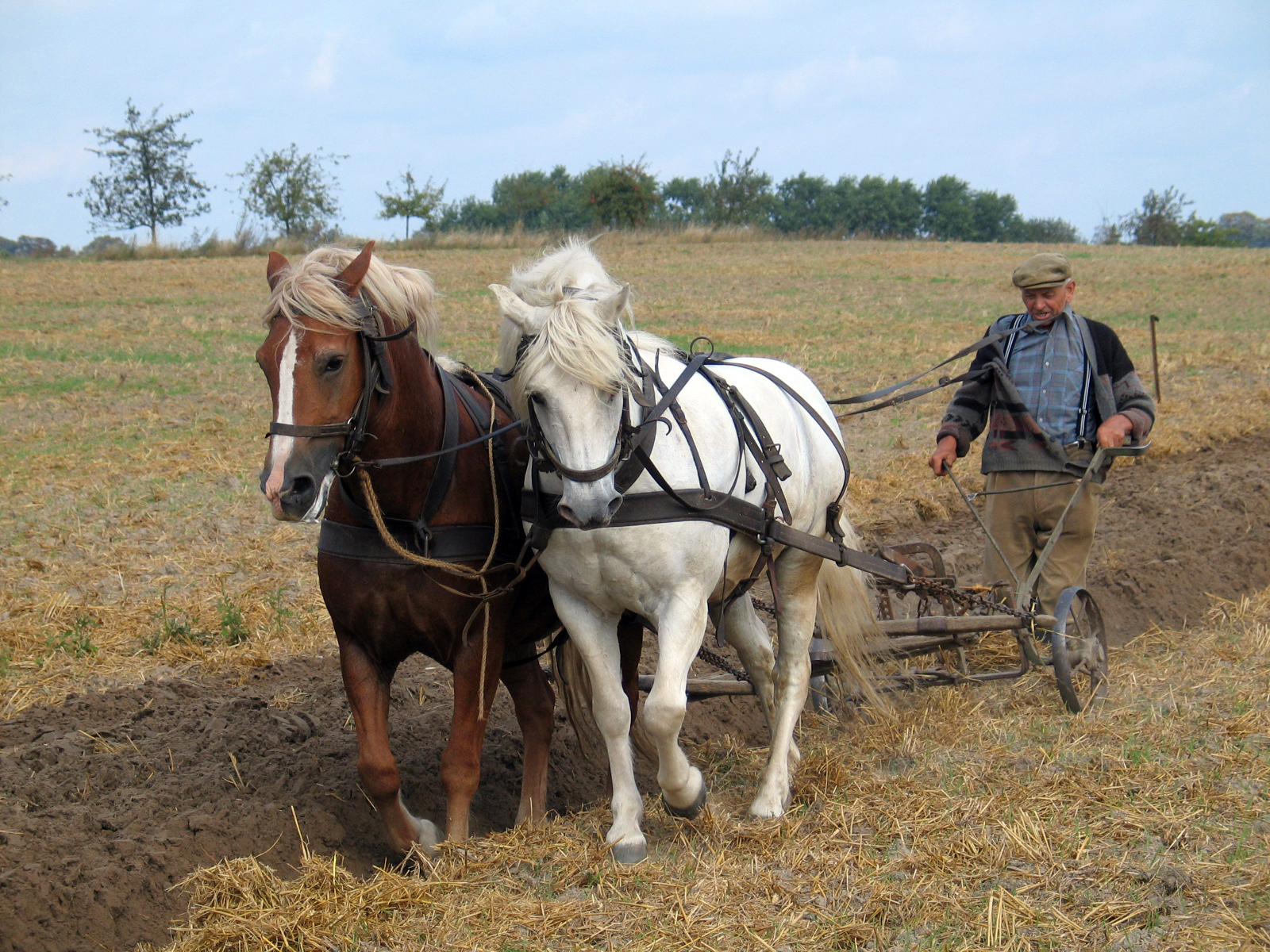
A farmer with a two-horse team and a single-furrow plough

The word is identical to the German and Dutch word for "morning" because the measurement was determined by the area that can be ploughed with a single-furrow horse or ox plough in one morning (measured from morning to noon). The morgen was usually defined as a rectangle with sides of an even number of local rods, as turning while ploughing was to be avoided as much as possible.

The area measure of the morgen varied regionally, but it was usually between one-fifth to half a hectare (2,000 to 5,000 m^{2}). In northern Germany, there were also morgens of 6,000 to 9,000 square meters, and in the marshes, up to over 11,000 square meters. With the standardization in the late 19th century (the metrified morgen introduced by the North German Confederation in 1869), four morgens equaled one hectare in the German Empire, which is why the morgen was sometimes referred to as a quarter hectare (vha) to distinguish it from traditional measures.

In the 20th century, the morgen, with its size of 25 ares, established itself as an agricultural area measure. However, with the increasing average farm size (from 2005 to 2015 by 36.4% to 59.6 hectares or 238.4 morgens), it has lost significance compared to the hectare. This is particularly evident where the average farm size in eastern Germany is around 1000 morgens.

The morgen was commonly set at about 60–70% of the tagwerk (German for "day's work") that referred to a full day of ploughing. The next lower measurement unit was the German rute or Imperial rod, but the metric rod length of 5 metres (16 ft) never became popular.

== Comparative measures to the Morgen in German-speaking regions ==
The following table shows an excerpt of morgen sizes as used in German-speaking regions. Some morgen were used in a wider area and thus had proper names. The actual area of a morgen was considerably larger in fertile areas of Germany or in regions where flat terrain prevails, presumably facilitating tilling. The next lower measurement unit to a morgen was usually in "Quadratruten" square rods.

German sizes of morgen
Region (Timespan)	Name	Size in m^{2}	original definition (QR = Quadratruten)
metric -	Viertelhektar = vha	2,500	(100 QR)
Homburg		1,906	160 QR
Franconia		2,000	
Frankfurt	Feldmorgen	2,025	160 QFeldR
Oldenburg		2,256	
Kassel	Acker	2,386	150 QR
Prussia (1816–1869)	Magdeburger Morgen	2,553.22	180 QR
Waldeck-Pyrmont	Magdeburger Morgen	2,553.22	180 QR
Bremen		2,572	120 QR
Schaumburg		2,585	120 QR
Hanover (before 1836)		2,608	120 QR
Hanover (after 1836)		2,621	120 QR
Cologne Rhineland	Rheinländischer Morgen	3,176	150 QR
Bergisches Land	Bergischer Morgen	2,132	120 QR
Württemberg (1806–1871)		3,152	384 QR
Frankfurt	Waldmorgen	3,256	160 QWaldR
Braunschweig	Waldmorgen	3,335	160 QR
Bavaria	Tagwerk	3,407	400 QR
Baden		3,600	400 QR
Oldenburg	Jück	4,538	160 QR
Danzig		ca. 5,000	300 QR
Holstein	Tonne (Tønde)	5,046	240 QGeestR
Schleswig-Holstein	Steuertonne	5,466	260 QGeestR
	Kulmischer Morgen	5,601.17	300 QR
East Frisia	Diemat (h)	5,674	
Mecklenburg		6,500	300 QR
Altes Land (Harburg & Stade)		8,185	
Hamburg		9,658	600 QGR
Kehdingen	Marschmorgen	10,477	
Altes Land		10,484	480 QR
Land of Hadeln		11,780	540 QR

== Poland ==
The Polish terms for the unit were morga, mórg, jutrzyna, the latter being a near-literal translation into Old Polish.

Comparison of Area units in Lesser Poland 1791–1876, 1 Franconian morg = 1 wiener morg (system morgi dolnoaustriackiej)
Unit	Miara (Unit)	Sążeń^{2} (Viennese fathom^{2})	Łokieć^{2} (Viennese ell^{2})	m^{2}
1 morg (morgen) (= 0.5755 ha)	3	1,600	6,439.02	5,754.64
1 miara (Unit) (= 19.18 are)		533.33	2,929.07	1,918
1 sążeń^{2} wiedeński (Viennese fathom)			4.0237	3.6
1 łokieć^{2} wiedeński (Viennese el^{2})				0.9

== Austria–Hungary ==
The term "morgen" was used in the Austrian Kingdom of Galicia and Lodomeria where 1 morgen was equal to 2,700 square metres (2/3 acre).

== South Africa ==
Until the advent of metrication in the 1970s, the morgen was the legal unit of measure of land in three of the four pre-1995 South African provinces: the Cape Province, the Orange Free State, and the Transvaal. In November 2007, the South African Law Society published a conversion factor of 1 morgen = 0.856,532 hectares, to be used "for the conversion of areas from imperial units to metric, particularly when preparing consolidated diagrams by compilation".

== See also ==
- Arpent
- Dutch units of measurement
- German obsolete units of measurement
- List of unusual units of measurement
