= Load (unit) =

Various units of weight or mass

The load, also known as a fodder, fother, and charrus (Latin: carrus, lit. "cartload"), is a historic English unit of weight or mass of various amounts, depending on the era, the substance being measured, and where it was being measured. The term was in use by the 13th century, and disappeared with legislation from the 1820s onwards. Modern equivalents of historical weights and measures are often very difficult to determine, and figures given here should be treated with caution.

== Etymology ==
According to the Oxford English Dictionary, the word "fother" (noun) is derived from:

OE. fóðer (strong neuter n.) = OS. fôthar (MDu. voeder, Du. voer), OHG. fuodar (MHG. vuoder, Ger. fuder):–WGer. *fôÞr(o); the continental words mean ‘cartload’, ‘a certain weight supposed to represent a cartload’, ‘a certain measure of wine’ (see fooder, fudder). The root is usually believed to be an ablaut variant of faÞ- to stretch out: see fathom n. 1. A load; a cart-load (of hay, turf, wood, etc.). b. transf. A mass; a quantity, ‘lot’. c. Used for an enormous quantity, a ‘cart-load’ of gold or money. 2. spec. 'A definite weight of some specified substance.' a. Of lead: Now usually 19½ cwt. b. ellipt. in phrases: 'to fall' as a fother (of lead); hence, a crushing blow.

== Lead load ==
In very general terms, a "load" or "fother" of metallic lead was approximately or exactly equal to one long ton of 2240 lbs (1016 kg), also equal to approximately one tonne. Fothers have been recorded from 2184 lbs (991 kg) to 2520 lbs (1143 kg).

According to the Tractatus de Ponderibus et Mensuris, a memorandum of Edward I (reigned 1272–1307), the load of metallic lead was 30 fotmals, 175 stone, or 2,100 Merchant pounds (approx. 1016 kg).

The Load of Lead doth consist of Thirty Fotmals, and every Fotmal containeth Six Stone, except Two Pound; and every Stone doth consist of Twelve Pound, and every Pound consisteth of the Weight of 25 Shillings, whereby the Sum in the Fotmal is Seventy Pound. But the Sum of the Stones in the Load is Eight Times Twenty and Fifteen, and it is proved by Six Times Thirty which is Nine Times Twenty. But of every Fotmal there are abated Two Pound in the foresaid Multiplication, which are Sixty, which make Five Stone. And so there are in the Load Eight Times Twenty and Fifteen as is aforesaid.

In Derbyshire up to the 13th century a fother of lead is recorded of 1680 lbs or 15 long hundredweight (cwt.) (approx. 762 kg), and likewise in Devon a load of lead weighed the same. An Act of Parliament (12 Cha. 2. c. 4) (1660) stated that a fodder or fother of lead was one long ton, or 20 cwt. (1016 kg)

Miners of lead ore in Yorkshire in the late 17th century used a fodder of 3,808 pounds (1,727 kg), on the assumption that the ore when smelted weighed about 65% less (about 2240 lbs or one long ton). Other measures were also used for lead ore, e.g. the volumetric "dish" used in the Low Peak district of Derbyshire was 14 pints (weighing 58 lbs, 26 kg), but in the High Peak it was 15 or 16 pints.

Fothers were not used in all districts; for example in the Mendip Hills and in Burnley, Lancashire, tons, hundredweights and pounds were used in the first half of the 17th century. Vivant-Léon Moissenet, a French mineralogist who studied and wrote about English mining in the mid 19th-century stated that in Shropshire 200 lbs were added to each ton of concentrate at the smelt works to make a ton of 2,440 pounds (1,110 kg).

By the early 19th century there was a vast multiplicity of local measurements of all types of goods, which a parliamentary report of 1820 made clear. For plumbers, and in London, a fodder was 19½ cwt (now about 990 kg), and with miners generally 22½ cwt (now about 1140 kg). In Derbyshire a "mill fodder" was 2820 lbs (1280 kg), but when shipped at Stockwith-on-Trent, 2408 lbs (now about 1092 kg). In Hull it was 2340 lbs (1060 kg). In Northumberland a fother of pig lead was 21 cwt. (1066 kg), and in Newcastle sometimes 22 cwt (now about 1120 kg).

The fother was generally used by miners, shippers and smelters. When the metallic lead finally came to be sold it was weighed precisely; its value was calculated to the nearest pound weight and the price adjusted accordingly.

== Straw load ==
The load of hay or straw was 36 trusses or 1,296 pounds (now about 588 kg).

== Wood load ==
The American load of stacked firewood varied. A load of unhewn wood came to 1 2/3 cord-feet or 26 2/3 cubic feet (now about 0.75 m³), while a load of hewn wood came to 1 23/40 cord-feet or 43 cubic feet (now about 1.2 m³).

== Wool load ==
The load of wool was 12 wey or 108.13 sacks (now about 1372 kg).

== Dung and lime ==
In Northumberland in the 1820s, a fodder of dung or of lime was equal to a cartload pulled by two horses.

== See also ==
- Imperial units
- US customary units
- Derbyshire lead mining history
