= Formel =

Formel may refer to:

- Formel (unit), an English unit of weight
- Formel (Stockhausen), a 1951 musical composition by Karlheinz Stockhausen
