= Cartload =

Cartload may refer to:

- The load of a cart
- Load (unit), an English unit of weight or mass
- Kwian (เกวียน), a Thai unit of volume
