= Trend, Denmark =

Trend
- Summer house village
- Location in Denmark
- Coordinates: 56°50′55″N 9°13′15″E
- Country: Denmark
- Region: Region Nordjylland
- Municipality: Vesthimmerland

Population
  - Total: 122
- Time zone: UTC+1 (CET)
  - Summer (DST): UTC+1 (CEST)
- Postal code: 9670

Trend is a town in North Jutland (Nordjylland), it is situated next to Bjørnsholm Bay, to which the closest town is Overlade. It has a caravan park and a minigolf course. With a population of 122 people, Trend is commonly defined as a summer house city (Sommerhusområde) since most of the houses are primarily used as summer houses. The name “Trend” likely comes from Trende Mill that was built by Vitskøl monastery in the 1200’s-1300’s. The town is located 22 km west of Aars and around 60 km south-west of Aalborg.

== History ==
The town can be traced back to the 12th century, following the regicide of Knud Lavard in 1131, a struggle for the throne lasted until Valdemar the Great defeated Svend at the Battle Of Grathe Heath in 1157. Following the battle, Valdemar donated to a monastery to thank God, resulting in the founding of the Vitskøl Monastery. Originally, the monastery planned to be the largest church in the Nordic region at the time, however it did not go to fruition due to a fire in 1287, resulting in a smaller version being built instead.

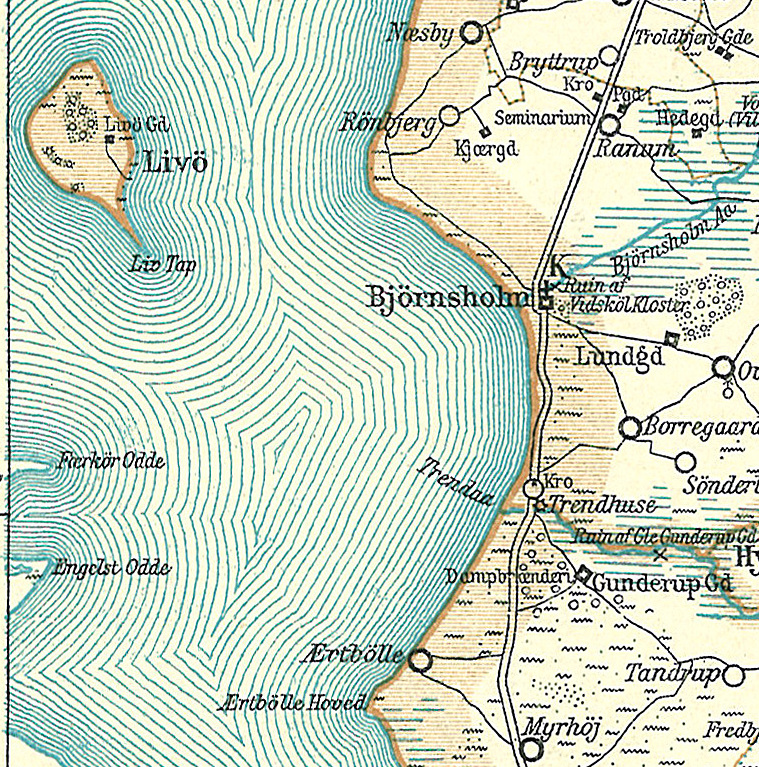
A map of Bjørnsholm Bay in 1900. Trend can be seen in the center-right.

Throughout the 1200’s and 1300’s, three mills were built by the monastery, that being Første Mølle (First Mill), Tvende Mølle (Second Mill) and Trende Mølle (Third Mill); the latter is believed to have inspired the name for the town.

== Environment ==
Trend is situated next to Bjørnsholm Bay, in which is close to four kilometers away from Trend River, (known as Trend Å in Danish) a river that is adjacent to the south of Trend.

In February 2024, a large spill of slurry occurred in Hødalen, situated along Løgstørvej between Aars and Vester Hornum, whose catchment area fed into the Trend River. However, the spill was stopped before it could reach the river by suctioning 800 m^{3} of slurry fluid out of the water, which was 600m^{3} more than what was spilled.

== Attractions & Buildings ==
Trend is home to several notable buildings, such as the seafood restaurant Trend Kro, Trend Camping and Holiday Center, as well as the annual “Trend Business Meetup”. There is also a workplace called TrendHub Workplace.

In 2023, Trend was included in a 6 million DKK ($938,634.00 USD) rural renewal program by the Vesthimmerland Municipality. Proposed projects for the town include a new bathing jetty and sauna, updates to the existing surf hut, and a community bonfire area. These developments were scheduled for approval in early 2024 with a five year timeline for completion.

== Trend Beach ==
Trend Beach is near the cottage areas of Trend. Located to the south of Trend, many home residents by Trend use this beach, as it is popular with adults and children because they can wade farther out into the water. The place is also popular with surfers as there is shallower water and the fact it’s on a several kilometers-long stretch that spans into the Limfjord.

To get to the beach, one navigates one of two tunnels, as those tunnels are the only way to get to the beach. Both tunnels often suffer from mild flooding.

In August 2024, the Vesthimmerland Municipality scheduled new improvements for the tunnels, which includes swapping out older stone for new stone material, a drainage pipe, and a pump to prevent the aforementioned flooding, as well as both tunnels being excavated by 20 centimeters.

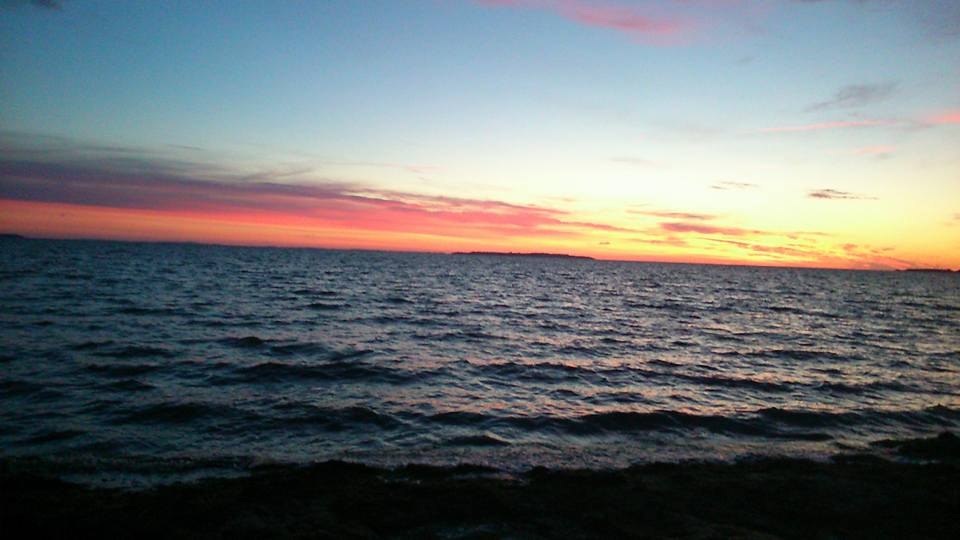
Trend Beach

== See also ==
- Vesthimmerland Municipality
- North Denmark Region
