= Bjørnsholm Bay =

Bay in Denmark

Coordinates: 56.848°N 9.182°E

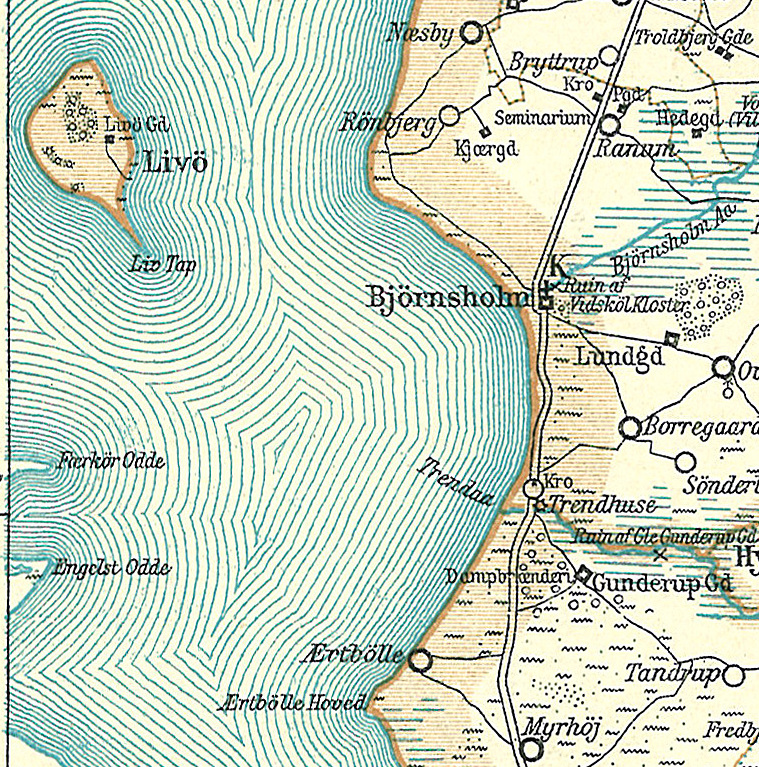
Bjørnsholm Bay around 1900

Bjørnsholm Bay (Danish: Bjørnsholm Bugt) is a bay in the Limfjord, along Himmerland's west coast, 10–20 kilometres (6–12 mi) southwest of Løgstør, Denmark. The bay is named after the estate of Bjørnsholm and extends approximately 9 kilometres (5.6 mi) from the hamlet of Rønbjerg in the north to the cliffs at Ertebølle in the south. Near Bjørnsholm and the Vitskøl monastery, Bjørnsholm Å (Bjørnsholm Stream) runs into the bay, and almost four kilometers to the south Trend Å (Trend Stream) has its mouth at Trend, where there is a cottage area. Nearby in the Limfjord is the island of Livø, whose southeastern tip, Livø Tab, almost reaches the bay.
