= Wey (unit) =

Unit of weight

The wey or weight (Old English: ƿæᵹe, waege, lit. "weight") was an English unit of weight and dry volume by at least 900 AD, when it began to be mentioned in surviving legal codes.

== Weight ==
A statute of Edgar the Peaceful set a price floor on wool by threatening both the seller and purchaser who agreed to trade a wool wey for less than 120 pence (Note: 2 Edgar c. 8) (i.e., ½ pound of sterling silver per wey), but the wey itself varied over time and by location. The wey was standardized as 14 stones of 12½ merchants' pounds each (175 lbs. or around 76.5 kg) by the time of the Assize of Weights and Measures c. 1300. This wey was applied to lead, soap, and cheese, as well as wool. 2 wey made a sack, 12 a load, and 24 a last.

The wool wey was later figured as 2 hundredweight of 8 stone of 14 avoirdupois pounds each (224 lbs. or about 101.7 kg).

The Suffolk wey was 356 avoirdupois pounds (around 161.5 kg). It was used as a measure for butter and cheese.

== Volume ==
As a measure of volume for dry commodities, it denoted roughly 40 bushels or 320 imperial gallons (1,500 litres).

== See also ==
- English units
- Stone, sack, last, & load
- Whey (unit)
