= Skojec =

Medieval unit of measure

Skojec was a medieval central European unit of account as well as a unit of mass. It was also used as a unit of currency. 1 skojec was equal to 1/24 of a grzywna.

1 skojec = 30 pfennigs
1 wiardunek = 6 skojecs
1 skojec = 2 groschen

The etymology of the word skojec derives from the word skot which in old Polish described cattle; cattle were used as the reference unit of exchange since at least the time of ancient Greece, as there are references in the Iliad to a suit of armor costing 9 oxen. Athenian lawgiver Draco, when establishing his laws in 621 BCE, defined all the fines in terms of how many cattle must be paid. The Latin word for money, pecunia, is proof that Romans always saw cattle (pecus) as the source of wealth. In time, a slab of copper with an imprint of an ox became equivalent to the worth of the animal. In India, the word rupia means both cattle and money. Similarly, in Poland skot meant cattle and its extension skojec described money.
