= Sack (unit) =

Traditional unit of mass or volume

The sack (abbreviation: sck.) was an English unit of weight or mass used for coal and wool. It has also been used for other commodities by weight, commodities by volume, and for both weight and volume in the United States.

== Wool ==
The wool sack or woolsack (Latin: saccus lanae or lane) was standardized as 2 wey of 14 stone each, with each stone 12 1/2 merchants' pounds each (i.e. 350 merchants' pounds or about 153 kilograms), by the time of the Assize of Weights and Measures c. 1300. 12 such sacks formed the wool last.

== Coal ==
The coal sack was standardized as an imperial hundredweight of 112 avoirdupois pounds, approximately 51 kilograms.

=== Large sack ===
Large sacks used for coaling in the Royal Navy

The large sack was a UK unit of weight for coal. It was introduced by the London, Westminster and Home Counties Coal Trade Act 1831 (1 & 2 Will. 4. c. lxxvi), which required coal to be sold by weight rather than volume.

The Royal Navy used large sacks holding two hundredweight for coaling its ships. These sacks were made of jute bound with Manila rope. They were filled in the hold of a collier using a scoop and then a wire cable was run through two iron rings at the mouth of the sack to close and hoist it over to the warship, twelve sacks at a time. A sack truck would then be used to take each sack to the chute of the warship's coal bunker where they would be emptied. These sacks were large and heavy, weighing at least sixteen pounds when empty, and costing 11 shillings and sixpence before the First World War.

==== Definition ====
The large sack was defined as 224 pounds.

==== Conversion ====
1 large sack ≡ 2 sacks, equivalent to 2 cwt, 224 lb, or about 102 kg

== Other uses ==
The sack has also been used as a unit of volume. In the American oil industry, a sack represents the amount of portland cement that occupies 1.15 cubic feet (8.6 US gal; 33 L), and in most cases weighs 94 pounds (43 kg). Other uses in the US include the measurement by volume of salt, where one sack is 215 pounds (98 kg), cotton where one sack is 140 pounds (63.5 kg) and flour, where one sack is just 100 pounds (45.4 kg). It has also been used as a measure of volume for dry goods in Britain, with one sack being equivalent to 15 imperial gallons (68 L).

In British usage, a sack of flour was equivalent to 20 stone, 280 pounds (127 kg) or one-eighth of a long ton. A sack of coal was 16 stone, or 224 pounds (102 kg), while the weight of a sack of wool depended on who was selling it. A sack of grower's wool was 3 1/4 hundredweight or 364 pounds (165 kg), whereas a sack of dealer's wool was considerably lighter, at 240 pounds (109 kg).
