= Whey (unit) =

Unit of mass for butter and cheese

Whey is a unit of weight for butter and cheese.

== Definition ==
Whey (Essex) is exactly equal to 236 pounds (107 kg).

== Conversion ==
1 Whey (Essex) ≡ 59/56 Barrel

1 Whey (Essex) ≡ 236 pounds

1 Whey (Essex) ≡ 107.04779932 kg

== See also ==
- Wey (unit)
