= Fotmal =

The fotmal (Old English: fotmael, lit. "foot-measure"; Latin: fotmal), also known as the foot (pes), formel, fontinel, and fotmell, was an English unit of variable weight particularly used in measuring production, sales, and duties of lead. Under the c. 1300 Assize of Weights and Measures, it was equal to 70 Merchants' pounds and made up 1/30 of a load of lead. Elsewhere, it was made of 70 avoirdupois pounds and made up 1/24 load. In 16th-century Derbyshire the fotmal was evidently divided into "boles" and made up 1/30 of a fother, meaning it was considered to be 84 avoirdupois pounds.

It continued to be used until the 16th century.
