= Grzywna (unit) =

First Polish monetary unit

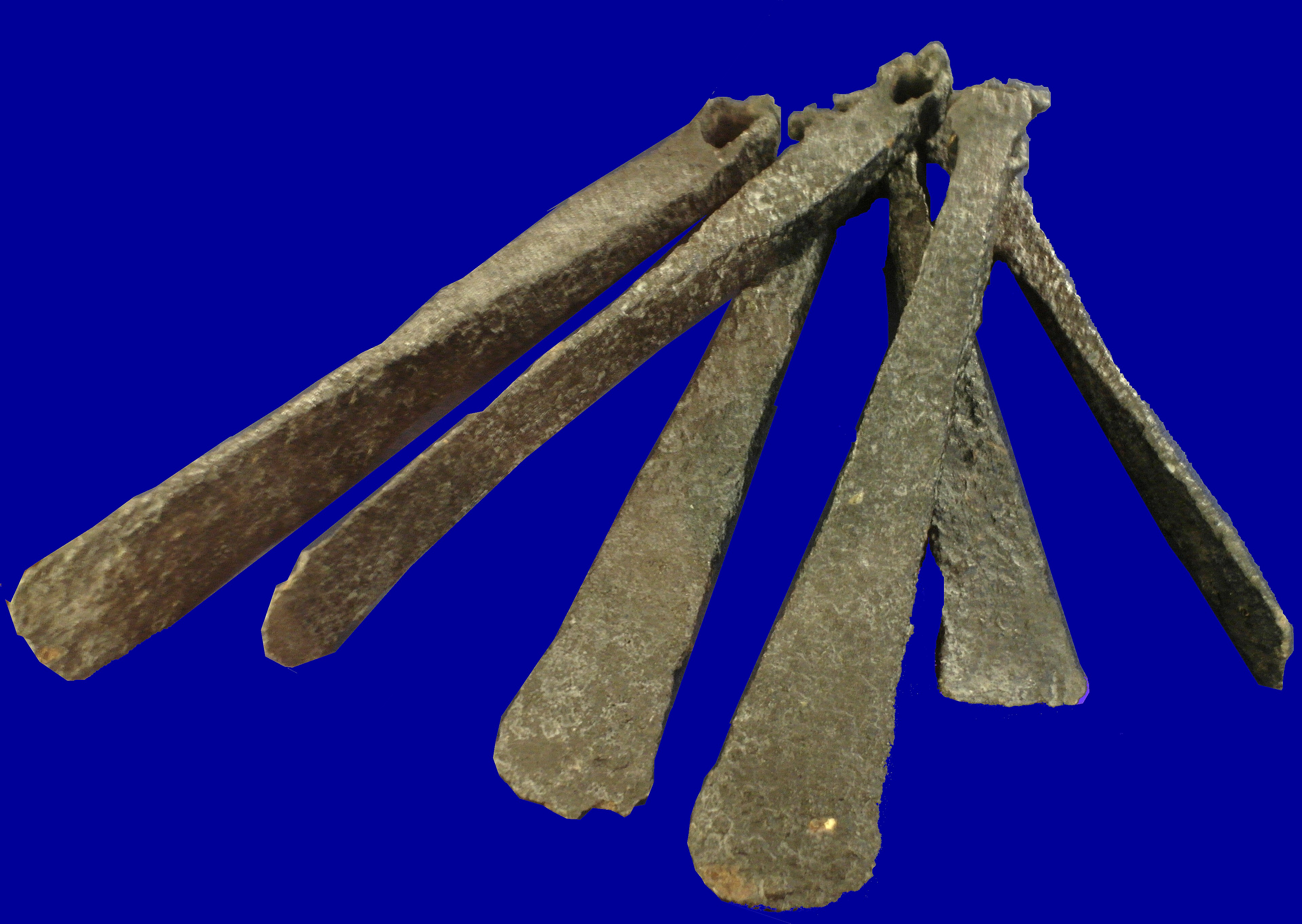
Ax-like grzywnas from Kostkowice, Poland, 9th to mid-10th century AD

The grzywna (Polish: [ˈɡʐɨvna]) was a measure of weight, mainly for silver, commonly used throughout medieval central and eastern Europe, particularly in the Kingdom of Poland and Kingdom of Bohemia (Czech: hřivna).

Grzywna was also a unit of measure of a unit of exchange, and as such used as money in the 10th–15th centuries. Silver ingots acted as commodity money before the widespread use of minted coins. Several different grzywnas developed with their own system of weight and exchange, such as the Kulm grzywna and the Kraków grzywna.

== Etymology ==
The name is derived from *grivĭna 'necklace' from *griva 'neck, nape, mane'. In modern Polish, grzywna literally translates as fine (legal penalty).

== Kraków grzywna ==
The Kraków grzywna, used in Poland, weighed anywhere from 196.26 g to 201.86 g, depending on the timeframe. In the 14th century, it was equal to 196.26 g, while in the beginning of the 16th century in weighed 197.684 g, but after 1558 it was equivalent to 201.802 g and after 1650 it was 201.86 g.

The Kraków grzywna was subdivided thus: 4 wiarduneks or quarters = 8 ounces = 16 drams = 24 skojecs = 96 grains = 240 denarii = 480 obols

As a measure of unit of exchange, the Kraków grzywna was equal to 48 Prague groschen. During the rule of Władysław I the Elbow-high 576 denarii were struck from one Kraków grzywna of silver. During the rule of his son Casimir the Great, 768 denarii were struck from it and during the reign of Władysław II Jagiełło, it was 864 denarii.

== See also ==
- Grivna
- Ukrainian hryvnia
- Mark (unit)
- Obsolete Polish units of measurement
