= Dung =

Dung most often refers to animal feces. Dung may also refer to:

== Science and technology ==
- Dry dung fuel
- Manure
- Cow dung
- Coprolite, fossilized feces
- Dung beetle

== Art ==
- Mundungus Fletcher or "Dung", a character in the Harry Potter novels
- The Dung, percussionist and singer for the Swedish folk music duet Philemon Arthur and the Dung
- Carburetor Dung, a Malaysian punk band which is also known as "DUNG"

== Others ==
- Dung, Doubs, a commune in the Doubs department in the Franche-Comté region in eastern France
- Nguyễn Tấn Dũng, Vietnamese communist politician
