= Wiardunek =

Medieval unit of mass

The Wiardunek (also referred to as wiardunk, czwartak or ferton; German: Viertel, Latin: ferto) was a Mediaeval Central European unit of mass most widely used in Poland and Germany. Wiardunek was also used as a unit of account, and as a such as commodity money.

As a unit of mass 1 wiardunek (ca. 49 g) was equivalent to 1/4 of grzywna. Two ounces made up one wiardunek, and in turn each ounce consisted of two lots.

As a unit of currency, the wiardunek was introduced probably around 14th century, first in Bohemia and then in other Central European states. This usage followed the same scheme as for other commodities, that is 1 wiardunek of pure silver was equivalent to 1/4 of grzywna, which in turn was composed of 64 groschen. This usage was true regardless of changes in overall weight of grzywna, which was the basic unit of mass in this system.
