= Stauf (measuring unit) =

The German word Stauf was used in the Middle Ages up to the beginning of the modern times to indicate a measure of capacity for liquids, which adhered to variable volumes in diverse regions and different periods of time.

== The cup or measure of capacity ==
The German dictionary (German: Deutsches Wörterbuch) of the Grimm Brothers (German: Brüder Grimm) provides two meanings for the expressions Stauf or Staufen in this context. It was used as a measure of capacity, as well as to name a drinking vessel. However, it is assumed that both meanings correlated with each other.

The German expression Stauf (Old High German: stouf, stauf(f), stouph) was used to indicate a more capacious drinking cup and became later on a synonym for goblet, chalice, jar and tankard. It is derived from the word *staupa, stemming from the old, then common Germanic language (see below), which was replaced by the loanwords cup (German: Becher) and chalice (German: Kelch) after a while. Apparently, the metallic drinking device called Stauf was originally a beaker and thus not provided with a foot. Yet, this word was then passed on to define other vessels like wooden buckets or containers used for milking.

It is quite obvious that a Stauf was not a suitable drinking cup for one person. Yet, its use as decorative vessel on special occasions is mentionend several times.

As measuring unit a Stauf, also written Stauff (Low-German: Stoff, Swedish: Stop, Icelandic: Staupa, Anglo-Saxon: Stoppa), corresponded in some regions to one Stuebchen (German: Stübchen). In itself this unit correlated to about 3.7 litres when it came to beer (German: Bier) in German-speaking areas. Depending on the regions where it was used, a Stauf respectively a Stuebchen was about the 40th to 45th part of one ohm (one ohm = circa 134 to 174.75 litres). If calculated in Maas when used for beer, this measure resulted in about four Maas, which then were about 4.3 litres (referring to the Bavarian Maas). Corresponding to wine (German: Wein) as well as firewater (German: Branntwein) one Stauf was about 3.3 litres.

When Rudolf I of Germany came to power (1273), one Stauf was then apparently reduced to one quarter. This means that the measuring unit started to correspond to more or less one litre (German: Liter) still in use today, depending on the regions applying it. One Stauf then was 0.825 up to more than one litre respectively one Maas, considering the liquid measured.

== Further meanings – origin of the expression ==
The German Dictionary of the Grimm Brothers also provides further entries for the expressions Stauf or Staufen which were sporadically in use. Examples in this context are (German) stauchen = to compress, (German) niederdrücken = to press down and (German) stauen = to retain.

Gerhard Köbler sees the origin of this expression in the originally Germanic words *staupa- and *staupaz, meaning steep (German: steil), elevated (German: hoch), towering (German: aufragend) in Old English: stéap, which expresses the same, as well as in Old High German: stoufi*, in the sense of steep (German: steil) and precipitous (German: abschüssig).
