= Tim Lokiec =

American artist (born 1977)

- Tim Lokiec. This Drawing Is Just Very Sad and Pathetic, 2005, mixed media on paper
- Born: 1977 (age 48–49); Cleveland, Ohio
- Education: Rhode Island School of Design. Columbia University.

Tim Lokiec (pronounced "lock-itch") (born 1977) is an artist based in New York City whose 2003 solo debut artworks were praised by The New York Times for their "remarkable visual and emotional intensity". In 2004, he was cited by London's Frieze Art Fair as being one of the world's most exciting artists who were nominated by 200 leading contemporary art galleries in the world. In 2006, the Kantor Feuer Gallery, known for discovering new talent and developing the careers of artists, and ranked as one of the top galleries in the world, held an exhibition of Lokiec's work. His works are also exhibited in the now British government-owned Saatchi Gallery. Lokiec did the cover design for Rich Bowering's 2011 book Big Fire at Spahn Ranch.

== Life and work ==
Lokiec was born in Cleveland, Ohio. He received his BA from Rhode Island School of Design and his MA from Columbia University.

Lokiec had his first solo show, Plateau Sigma, at the LFL Gallery, Chelsea in June 2003. In a review of the show, Roberta Smith commented that the figurative paintings "achieve a remarkable visual and emotional intensity, even when meaning and intention are hard to fathom." She also mentioned his "marvelous drawings", which he had been exhibiting previously in other venues and some of which were included in the show. At the same time he was also shown in the ATM Gallery, New York, in a "noteworthy group show". Later that year he appeared in another group show, [My people were fair...] curated by Bob Nickas, at Team Gallery in New York.

He was shown in the 2004 Frieze Art Fair. In 2005, he was one of three artists in the inaugural exhibition in Zenshi Mikami's Zenshi Gallery in Tokyo with two drawings.
