= German units of measurement =

The units of measurement of German-speaking countries consist of a variety of units, with varying local standard definitions. While many were made redundant with the introduction of the metric system, some of these units are still used in everyday speech and even in stores and on street markets as shorthand for similar amounts in the metric system. For example, some customers ask for one pound (ein Pfund) of something when they want 500 grams.

Efforts to consolidate the many local systems led to the North German Confederation's Weights and Measures Ordinance of 17 August 1868. It set the metre and kilogram as the common standards and, after a transition period, made the metric system mandatory from 1 January 1872. For merchants, this meant converting or replacing existing measures, weights, and scales; instruments approved for trade use were checked against the new official standards and stamped as verified.

The metric system became compulsory in Austria on 1 January 1876.

Some obsolete German units have names similar to units that were traditionally used in other countries, and that are still used in a limited number of cases in both the United Kingdom (imperial units) and the United States (United States customary units).

== German system ==
Before the introduction of the metric system in Germany, almost every town had its own definitions of the units shown below. Often, towns posted local definitions on a wall of the city hall. For example, the front wall of the old city hall of Rudolstadt (still standing) has two marks that show the "Rudolstädter Elle", the proper length of the Elle in that city. Supposedly, by 1810, there were 112 different standards for the Elle around Germany.

"... the measure of cloth, for example, was elle which in each region stood for a different length. An elle of textile material brought in Frankfurt would get you 54.7 cm of cloth, in Mainz 55.1 cm, in Nuremberg 65.6 cm, in Freiburg 53.5 cm ..."

== Length ==
=== Meile (mile) ===
A German geographic mile (geographische Meile) is defined as 1/15 of an equatorial degree, equal to 7,420.54 m (24,345.6 ft). A common German mile, land mile, or post mile (Gemeine deutsche Meile, Landmeile, Postmeile) was defined in various ways at different places and different times. After the introduction of the metric system in the 19th century, the Landmeile was generally fixed at 7500 m (the Reichsmeile), but before then there were many local and regional variants (of which some are shown below):

Some kinds of Meile
Place	Metric equivalent	Notes
Breslau (Wrocław)	6700 m	Used throughout Silesia
Bavaria (Bayern)	7415 m	Equivalent to 1/15 of an equatorial degree, or 25,406 Bavarian feet.
Württemberg	7449 m	
Reichsmeile	7500 m	'imperial mile' – New mile when the metric system was introduced. Prohibited by law in 1908.
Anhalt	7532 m	
Denmark, Prussia	7532 m	24,000 Prussian feet. Also known as "(Dänische/Preußische) Landmeile". In 1816, King Frederick William III of Prussia adopted the Danish mile at 7532 m, or 24000 Prussian feet.
Saxony (Sachsen)	7500 m	In the 17th–18th centuries or so, 9062 m = 32000 (Saxon) feet; later 7500 m (as in Prussia and the rest of Germany).
Schleswig-Holstein	8803 m	
Baden	8000 m	8889 m before 1810, 8944 m before 1871
Hesse-Kassel	9206 m	
Lippe-Detmold	9264 m	
Saxony (Sachsen)	9062 m	32000 (Saxon) feet (in the 19th century 7500 m, see above).
Westfalia (Westfalen)	11100 m	but also 9250 m
Oldenburg	9894 m	
Rhineland (Rheinland)	4119 m	
Palatinate (Pfalz)	4630 m	
Osnabrück/France	5160 m	
Wiesbaden	1000 m	

=== Wegstunde ===
One hour's travel, used up to the 19th century. In Germany 1/2 Meile or 3.71 km (2.31 mi). After 1722 in Saxony 1/2 post mile = 1000 Dresden rods = 4531 m. In Switzerland 16,000 ft or 4.88 km.

=== Fuß (foot) ===
The Fuß or German foot varied widely from place to place in the German-speaking world, and also with time. In some places, more than one type of Fuß was in use. One source from 1830 gives the following values:

Some kinds of Fuß
Place	Name	Local equivalent	Metric equivalent
Aachen (Aix-la-Chapelle)	Feldmaßfuß	1/6 Klafter	282 mm
Aachen	Baufuß	1/16 Ruthe	288 mm
Aargau, Canton of	Fuß		300 mm
Aichstadt, Bavaria	old Fuß		307 mm
Altona, Holstein	Fuß		286 mm
Anspach, Bavaria	Werkfuß		299 mm
Appenzell, Canton of	Fuß		313 mm
Aschaffenburg, Bavaria	Fuß		288 mm
Augsburg, Bavaria	Werkschuh		296 mm
Baden	Reichsfuß	10 Zoll, 1/10 Ruthe	300 mm
Baireuth, Bavaria	Fuß		298 mm
Bamberg, Bavaria	Fuß		303 mm
Basel, Canton of	Stadtschuh		304 mm
Bavaria	Fuß		292 mm
Bergamo, Austria	Fuß	1/6 Cavezzo	435 mm
Berlin	Prussian Reichsfuß		313.8536 mm
Bern, Canton of	gewöhnlicher Fuß	12 Zoll	298 mm
Bern, Canton of	Steinbrecherfuß	13 Zoll	317 mm
Bohemia	Fuß or Stopa		296 mm
Bozen, Austria	Tyroler-Fuß		334 mm
Braunschweig (Brunswick)	Fuß	1/16 Ruthe	285 mm
Bremen	Fuß	1/16 Ruthe	289 mm
Breslau	old Silesian Fuß	1/16 Ruthe	283 mm
Bünden, Canton of	churischer Fuß		322 mm
Calenberg Land	Fuß	1/16 Ruthe	292 mm
Carlsruhe (as Baden)	Fuß		300 mm
Cassel, Hessen	Fuß	1/14 Ruthe	287 mm
Cleve, Prussia	Fuß		295 mm
Cöln am Rhein (Cologne), Prussia	Fuß		287 mm
Cremona, Austria	old Fuß		480 mm
Danzig, Prussia	old Fuß	1/2 Elle	287 mm
Darmstadt	Hessian Reichsfuß	10 Zoll	250 mm
Darmstadt	old Darmstadt Fuß	12 Zoll	288 mm
Dordrecht, Netherlands	Fuß		361 mm
Dresden, Saxony	Fuß		260 mm
Duderstadt, Hanover	Fuß		290 mm
Durlach (as Baden)	Fuß		300 mm
Durlach	old Fuß		291 mm
Emden, Hanover	Fuß		296 mm
Erfurt, Prussia	old Fuß	1/14 Feldruthe, 1/16 Bauruthe	283 mm
Frankfurt am Main	Fuß		285 mm
Freiburg, Canton of	Werkfuß	12 Zoll, 1/10 Werkklafter	293 mm
Friedberg in der Wetterau, Oberhessen	Fuß		291 mm
Friedrichsstadt, Denmark	Fuß		296 mm
Fulda, Kurhessen	Werkfuß	1/2 Elle	250 mm
Genf (Geneva), Canton of	Fuß	1/8 Ruthe	325 mm
Gießen, Oberhessen	Fuß		298 mm
Glarus, Canton of	Fuß		300 mm
Glatz, Prussia	Werkfuß		287 mm
Göttingen, Hanover	Fuß		291 mm
Gotha, Saxe-Coburg-Gotha	Fuß		287 mm
Halle an der Saale, Prussia	Werkfuß		288 mm
Halle an der Saale, Prussia	Feldfuß		433 mm
Hamburg	Fuß	1/6 Klafter, 1/16 Geestruthe	286 mm
Hanau, Hessen	Fuß	2/25 Ruthe	285 mm
Hanover, capital of the Kingdom	Fuß	1/2 Elle, 1/16 Ruthe	292 mm
Heidelberg, Baden	Fuß		278 mm
Heilbronn, Württemberg	Fuß		278 mm
Heiligenstadt, Prussia	old Fuß		283 mm
Herford, Prussia	old Fuß		295 mm
Hildesheim, Hanover	Fuß	1/16 Ruthe	280 mm
Holstein	Fuß		296 mm
Innsbruck, Austria	Tyroler-Fuß		317 mm
Königsberg, Prussia	old Fuß	1/15 Ruthe	307 mm
Krakau	Fuß or Stopa		356 mm
Lausanne, Canton of Waadt	Fuß		293 mm
Leipzig, Saxony	gewöhnlicher Fuß	1/2 Elle, 1/6 Klafter, 1/16 Ruthe	282 mm
Lemberg, Austria	Galizian Fuß		297 mm
Lemgo, Lippe	Fuß		287 mm
Lindau, Bavaria	Fuß		307 mm
Lindau, Bavaria	Feldmeßschuh, Bauschuh		289 mm
Linz, Austria	Fuß	Klafter	303 mm
Lübeck	Fuß		291 mm
Lucern, Canton of	Fuß (for wood measure)		314 mm
Lucern, Canton of	Zimmerwerkschuh		304 mm
Lucern, Canton of	Bau- and Feldmeßschuh		284 mm
Milan, Austria	old Fuß		398 mm
Mainz, Hessen	Werkfuß		314 mm
Mainz, Hessen	Kameralfuß (for firewood)		287 mm
Mannheim, Baden	Fuß		290 mm
Mecklenburg	Fuß	1/2 Elle, 1/16 Ruthe	291 mm
Metz, France	old Fuß		406 mm
Mühlhausen, Prussia	Fuß	1/16 Ruthe	281 mm
Neufchatel, Principality of	Werkfuß		293 mm
Neufchatel, Principality of	Feldmeßfuß		318 mm
Nordhausen, Prussia	old Fuß		292 mm
Nuremberg, Bavaria	Stadtfuß	1/16 Ruthe	304 mm
Nuremberg, Bavaria	Artillery Fuß		292 mm
Oldenburg	Fuß	1/20 Ruthe	296 mm
Osnabrück, Hanover	Fuß		279 mm
Padua, Austria	Fuß	1/6 Cavezzo	428 mm
Prague, Austria	Bohemian Fuß or Česká stopa		296 mm
Prussia, Rheinland	Reichsfuß		313.8536 mm
Ratzeburg, Mecklenburg-Schwerin	Fuß		291 mm
Regensburg, Bavaria	Fuß		313 mm
Rheinbaiern	Fuß	12 Zoll, 1/3 metre	333 mm
Rheinland	Rheinländischer Fuß		313.8536 mm
Rostock, Mecklenburg-Schwerin	Fuß	1/2 Elle, 1/16 Ruthe	286 mm
Sanct Gallen, Canton of	Fuß		313 mm
Schaffhausen, Canton of	Fuß		298 mm
Silesia (Austrian part)	Fuß		289 mm
Solothurn, Canton of	Fuß		293 mm
Stade, Hanover	Fuß		291 mm
Stettin, Prussia	old Pomeranian Fuß		285 mm
Stralsund, Prussia	old Fuß		291 mm
Strassburg, France	Fuß		289 mm
Stuttgart	Reichsfuß	1/2 Elle, 1/10 Ruthe	286 mm
Tessin, Canton of	Fuß		397 mm
Thorn, Prussia	old Fuß		297 mm
Trento, Austria	Fuß		366 mm
Trier, Prussia	Land- and Werkfuß		294 mm
Trier, Prussia	Waldfuß		310 mm
Trier, Prussia	Zimmermannsfuß		305 mm
Tyrol, Austria	Fuß		334 mm
Udine, Austria	Fuß		329 mm
Ulm, Württemberg	Fuß		289 mm
Venice, Austria	Fuß	1/5 Passo	348 mm
Verden, Hanover	Fuß		291 mm
Verona, Austria	Fuß	1/6 Cavezzo	347 mm
Vienna, Austria	Fuß	1/6 Klafter	316 mm
Waadt, Canton of	Fuß	10 Zoll, 1/10 Ruthe	300 mm
Wallis, Canton of	Fuß		325 mm
Weimar	Fuß		282 mm
Wesel, Prussia	old Fuß		236 mm
Wetzlar, Prussia	old Fuß		274 mm
Wiesbaden, Nassau	Fuß		288 mm
Wismar, Mecklenburg-Schwerin	Fuß		292 mm
Wittenberg, Prussia	old Fuß		283 mm
Worbis, Prussia	old Fuß		286 mm
Württemberg	Reichsfuß	1/2 Elle, 1/10 Ruthe	286 mm
Würzburg, Bavaria	Fuß	1/2 Elle	294 mm
Zug, Canton of	Fuß		301 mm
Zug, Canton of	Steinfuß		268 mm
Zürich, Canton of	Fuß	1/6 Klafter, 1/10 Ruthe	301 mm
Except where noted, based on Niemann (1830). The values of the other local units mentioned also varied widely.

=== Rute (rod) ===
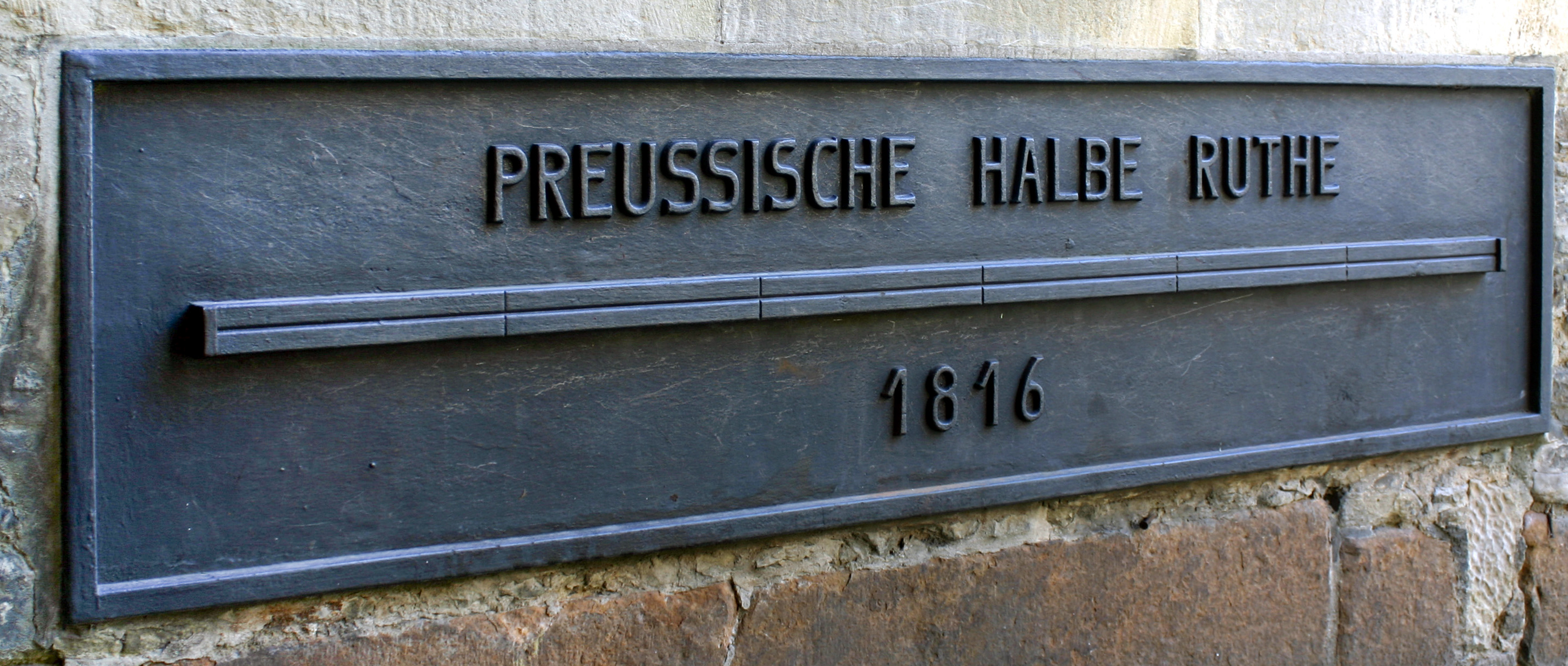
A standard at the City Hall in Münster, Germany from 1816; the bar shown is one "Prussian half rod" long.

The Rute or Ruthe is of Carolingian origin, and was used as a land measure. Many different kinds of Ruthe were used at various times in various parts of the German-speaking world. They were subdivided into differing numbers of local Fuß, and were of many different lengths. One source from 1830 lists the following:

Some kinds of Ruthe
Place	Name	Local equivalent	Metric equivalent
Aachen (Aix-la-Capelle)	Feldmeßruthe	16 Fuß	4.512 m
Baden	Ruthe	10 Fuß	3 m
Basel, Canton of	Ruthe	16 Fuss	4.864 m
Bern, Canton of	Ruthe	10 Fuss	2.932 m
Braunschweig (Brunswick)	Ruthe	16 Fuß	4.565 m
Bremen	Ruthe	8 Ellen or 16 Fuß	4.626 m
Calenberg	Ruthe	16 Fuß	4.677 m
Cassel, Hessen	Ruthe	14 Fuß	4.026 m
Hamburg	Geestruthe	16 Fuß	4.583 m
Hamburg	Marschruthe	14 Fuß	4.010 m
Hannover	Ruthe	16 Fuß	4.671 m
Lever, Oldenburg	Ruthe	20 Fuß	4.377 m
Mecklenburg	Ruthe	16 Fuß	4.655 m
Nuremberg, Bavaria	Ruthe	16 Fuß	4.861 m
Oldenburg	Ruthe	20 Fuß	5.927 m
Prussia, Rheinland	Ruthe	12 Fuß	3.766 m
Saxony	Ruthe	16 Leipziger Fuß	4.512 m
Württemberg	Reichsruthe	10 Fuß	2.865 m
Württemberg	old Ruthe	16 Fuß	4.583 m
Zürich, Canton of	Ruthe	10 Fuss	3.009 m
Except where noted, based on Niemann (1830). The value of the local Fuß also varied widely.

=== Klafter ===
Typically 6 feet. Regional variants from 1.75 m in Baden to 3 m in Switzerland.

=== Lachter ===
The Lachter was the most common unit of length used in mining in German-speaking areas. Its exact length varied from place to place but was roughly between 1.9 and 2.1 m.

=== Elle (ell) ===
Distance between elbow and fingertip. In the North, often 2 feet, in Prussia 1 7/8 feet, in the South variable, often 2 1/2 feet. The smallest known German Elle is 402.8 mm (15.86 in), the longest 811 mm (31.9 in).

=== Zoll (inch) ===
Usually 1/12 foot, but also 1/11 and 1/10.

=== Linie ===
Usually 1/12 inch, but also 1/10.

== Volume ==
=== Quent ===
It is 1/5 of any measure.

=== Malter ===
It is a larger volume unit of around one large sack of wheat that a person could carry. However, the exact volumetric size and weight were locally very different in each feudal state. For more details, see .

=== Klafter ===
For firewood, 2.905 m^{3} (102.6 cu ft).

=== Nösel ===
In general, the Nösel (also spelled Össel) was a measure of liquid volume equal to half a Kanne ("jar," "jug," "bottle," "can"). Volume often varied depending on whether it was beer or wine. Its subdivisions were the Halbnösel ("Half-Nösel") and the Viertelnösel ("Quarter-Nösel").

An Ahm was a measure used for wine or beer. An Eimer ("Bucket") was a container that was a fifth of an Ahm. A Viertel ("Fourth") was a fourth of an Eimer. A Stübchen ("Cozy Room"), also called a Stauf, was a measure of wine or beer that was equal to two Kannen. It was the approximate amount of wine or beer that could serve an entire room in a tavern. A Kanne was a measure of wine or beer large enough to fill a humpen (tankard) or krug (wine flagon or beer pitcher). A Quartier ("quarter-measure") was a fourth of a Stübchen. A Nösel was a cup or mug of wine or beer.

Actual volumes so measured, however, varied from one state or even one city to another. Within Saxony, for example, the "Dresden jar" held approximately 1 US quart or 0.95 litres or 0.83 imperial quarts, so a nösel in Dresden was about 1 US pint (0.47 L; 0.83 imp pt). The full volume of a "Leipzig jar" measured 1.2 liters (1.3 U.S. qt; 1.1 imp qt); the Leipzig nösel was therefore 0.6 liters (0.63 U.S. qt; 0.53 imp qt).

1/320 Ahm = 1/64 Eimer = 1/16 Viertel = 1/8 Stübchen / Stauf = 1/4 Kannen = 1/2 Quartiers = 1 Nösel = 2 Halbnöseln = 4 Viertelnöseln

The nösel was used in minor commerce, as well as in the household to measure meal, grain, and such. These units of measure were officially valid in Saxony until 1868, when the metric system was introduced. Nevertheless, the old measures have continued in private use for decades.

One modification was introduced in Thuringia. There, the nösel was, by extension, also a measure of area; namely, the area of land which could be sown with one nösel of seed – or about 19.36 square yards (16.19 m^{2}; 0.00400 acres).

== Mass ==
=== Pfund ===
- Pfund (Prussia): 467.711 g
- Zollpfund: 500 g

=== Mark ===
1/2 Pfund. Equal to 233.856 g (Cologne).

=== Unze ===
1/16 Pfund. Roughly equal to 29.23 g.

=== Loth ===
1/32 Pfund, or 1/16 Mark. Equal to 14.606 g (Prussia).

=== Quentchen ===
1/96 Pfund. Roughly equal to 4.872 g.

=== Quint ===
1/128 Pfund. Roughly equal to 3.65 g.

=== Pfennig ===
1/512 Pfund. Roughly equal to 0.9135 g.

=== Gran ===
1/7690 Pfund. Roughly equal to 0.0609 g.

== See also ==
- Historical weights and measures
- List of obsolete units of measurement
- SI
- Weights and measures

== Bibliography ==
- François Cardarelli: Encyclopedia of Scientific Units, Weights and Measures. Their SI Equivalences and Origins. Springer, Berlin 2003. ISBN 1-85233-682-X
- Helmut Kahnt, Bernd Knorr: Alte Masse, Münzen und Gewichte. Bibliographisches Institut Mannheim/Wien/Zürich 1987. (Lizenzausgabe von VEB Bibliographisches Institut Leipzig 1986) (in German)
- Wolfgang Trapp: Kleines Handbuch der Maße, Zahlen, Gewichte und der Zeitrechnung. Reclam Stuttgart, 2. Auflage 1996. ISBN 3-15-008737-6 (in German)
- Günther Scholz, Klaus Vogelsang: Kleines Lexikon: Einheiten, Formelzeichen. Fachbuchverlag Leipzig 1991 ISBN 3-343-00500-2 (in German)
- Johann Christian Nelkenbrechers Taschenbuch eines Banquiers und Kaufmanns: enthaltend eine Erklärung aller ein- und ausländischen Münzen, des Wechsel-Courses, Usos, Respect-Tage und anderer zur Handlung gehörigen Dinge; mit einer genauen Vergleichung des Ellen-Maaßes, Handels-, Gold- und Silber-Gewichts, auch Maaße von Getreide und flüssigen Sachen derer fürnehmsten europäischen Handels-Plätze. Nachdruck der Ausgabe 1769: VDM Verlag Dr. Müller, Düsseldorf 2004. ISBN 3-936755-58-2 (in German)
- William Tate (1868). The Modern Cambist: Forming a Manual of Foreign Exchanges, in the Different Operations of Bills of Exchange and Bullion, According to the Practice of All Trading Nations, with Tables of Foreign Weights and Measures, and Their Equivalents in English and French.
