= Lot (weight) =

Unit of mass

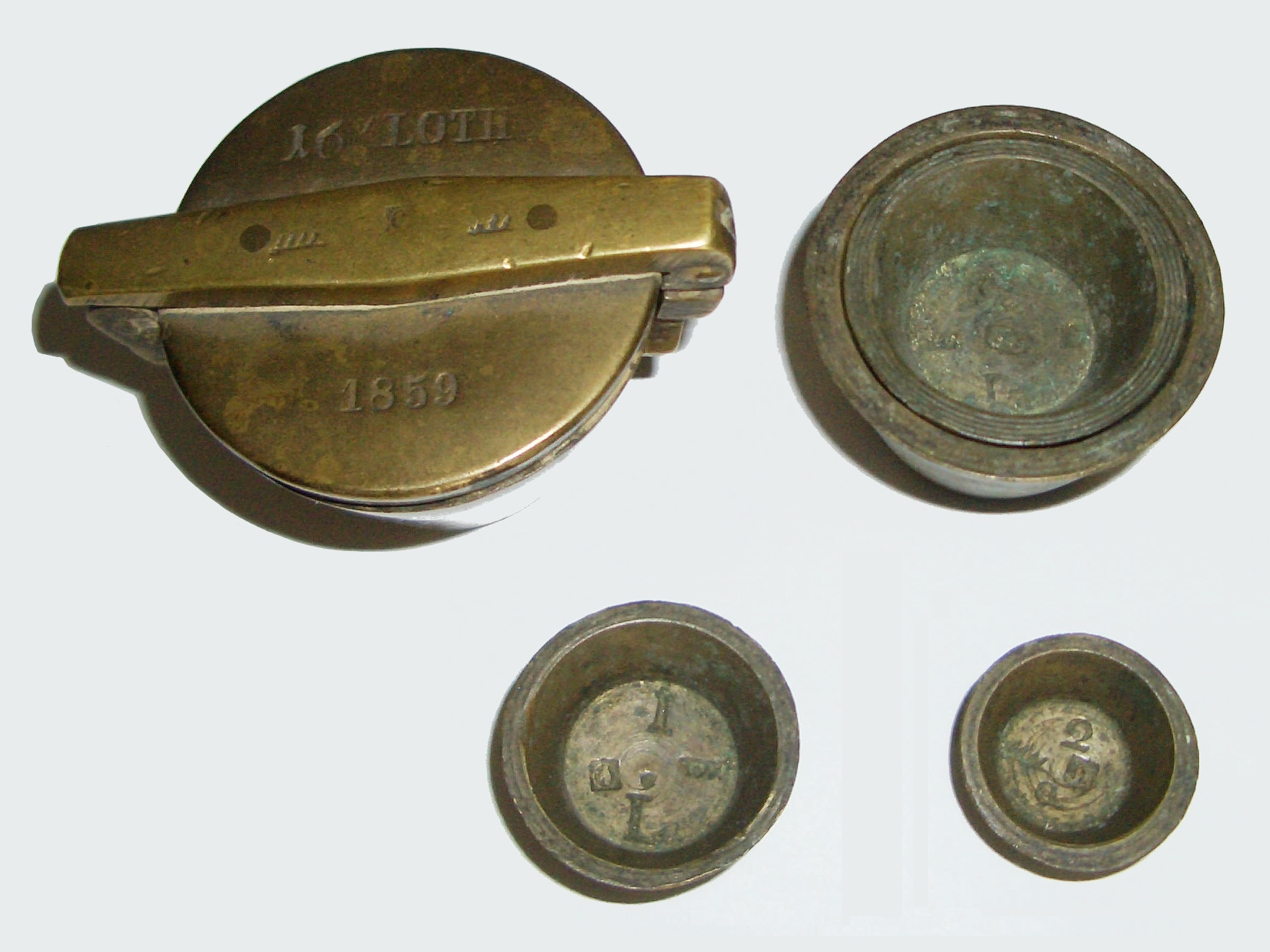
Württemberg Loth (1859)

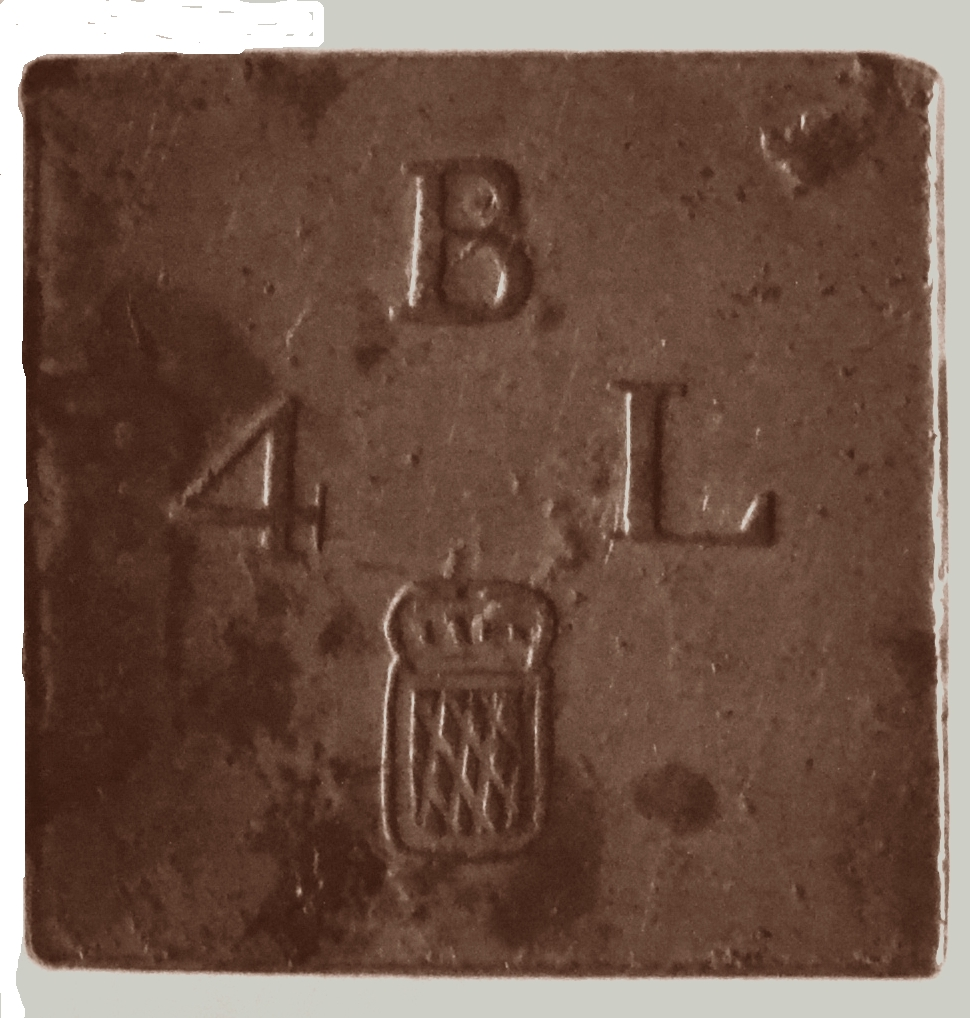
Bavarian 4 Loth (before 1870) prismatic

The Lot (formerly also written Loth) was a unit of measurement of mass, which was mainly used in German-speaking states of the Holy Roman Empire and in Scandinavia.

It was replaced in the German Reich in 1868/69/72, in Austria in 1871/76 and in Switzerland in 1875/77 by the metric unit of measurement, the gramme. But in the early 20th century it was still used as a popular unit of measure in cooking and baking recipes.

An imprecise but clear rule of thumb is that a lot corresponds to a "spoonful".

== Old Lot ==
In Germany, Austria and Switzerland, the following weight system was traditionally used:

1/32 (trading) Pfund = 1 Lot = 4 Quents = 16 Pfennig weights = 32 Heller weights

The Lot had different weights in the various German states depending on the definition of the Pfund ("pound"); its definition also varied over time. However it was mostly set at between 14 g and 18 g. Some examples:

- 14.606 g before May 1856 in Prussia, Anhalt, Hesse, Homburg, Frankfurt am Main, Lippe-Detmold, Schaumburg-Lippe, Mecklenburg-Strelitz, Nassau, Reuss, Saxony, Saxe-Altenburg, Saxe-Coburg, Saxe-Gotha, Saxe-Weimar, Schwarzburg-Rudolstadt, Schwarzburg-Sondershausen, Waldeck and Württemberg
- 15.1 g in Mecklenburg-Schwerin
- 15.2 g in Lübeck
- 15.6 g in Baden, Bremen and the Grand Duchy of Hesse
- 15 5/8 = 15.625g in Württemberg
- 15.9 g in Saxe-Meiningen
- 17.5 g in Austria
- 17.6 g in Bavaria

== New Lot, Zoll-Lot, Postlot ==
On 27 May 1856, an act concerning "a common state weight" system was issued in Prussia for the German Customs Union (Deutscher Zollverein). This redefined the weights as follow:

- 1 Pfund = 0.5 kg
- 1/120,000 Last = 1/3000 Center = 1/30 Pfund = 1 Lot = 10 Quents = 100 Cents = 1,000 Grains

1 Lot corresponded to 16.666 g and at the same time to a Vereinstaler fine. It was thus also used as a unit of silver fineness within the monetary system. See Lot (fineness).

This means that our new weight can easily be compared with the French one, which is also used in other countries, e.g. was introduced in the Netherlands and in Lombardy.

— Johann Christian Gädicke, Berliner Ausrechner von kleinen zu großen Preisen…

In comparison tables of old and new units of measurement of the same name in Prussia, the pre-1856 Lot (and also other units of measurement) was often used with the prefix "old" and the new Lot, valid from 27 May 1856, with the prefix "Neu" ("new") or "Zoll" ("customs"). The post office also used the term Postlot from 1858.

Apart from Prussia, this classification of weights also applied in Anhalt, Mecklenburg-Schwerin, Mecklenburg-Strelitz, Saxony and the Thuringian states.

In north-western Germany, on the other hand, the unit system was adapted more closely to the metric system at the same time. In Brunswick, Bremen, Hamburg, Hanover, Lübeck, Oldenburg and Schaumburg-Lippe the lot was defined as a tenth of a Zollpfund = 50g. In the other states, the pound remained divided into 32 lots.

In Austria and Bavaria there was for a time a "metric Lot" of 10 g (repealed by law in 1888). In Austria, the Czech Republic and Poland, this metric Lot lives on as the decagramme to this day.

== See also ==
- Old Polish units of measurement
- Obsolete Finnish units of measurement
- Obsolete Russian units of measurement
- Obsolete Tatar units of measurement
