= Weight =

Force on a mass due to gravity

- A diagram explaining mass and weight
- Common symbols: $W$
- SI unit: newton (N)
- Other units: pound-force (lbf)
- In SI base units: kg⋅m⋅s^{−2}
- Extensive?: Yes
- Intensive?: No
- Conserved?: No
- Derivations from other quantities: $W = mg$; $W = ma$
- Dimension: $\mathsf{MLT}^{-2}$

In science and engineering, the weight of an object is a quantity associated with the gravitational force exerted on the object by other objects in its environment, although there is some variation and debate as to the exact definition.

Some standard textbooks define weight as a vector quantity, the gravitational force acting on the object. Others define weight as a scalar quantity, the magnitude of the gravitational force. Yet others define it as the magnitude of the reaction force exerted on a body by mechanisms that counteract the effects of gravity: the weight is the quantity that is measured by, for example, a spring scale. Thus, in a state of free fall, the weight would be zero. In this sense of weight, terrestrial objects can be weightless: so if one ignores air resistance, one could say the legendary apple falling from the tree, on its way to meet the ground near Isaac Newton, was weightless.

The unit of measurement for weight is that of force, which in the International System of Units (SI) is the newton. For example, an object with a mass of one kilogram has a weight of about 9.8 newtons on the surface of the Earth, and about one-sixth as much on the Moon. Although weight and mass are scientifically distinct quantities, the terms are often confused with each other in everyday use (e.g. comparing and converting force weight in pounds to mass in kilograms and vice versa).

Further complications in elucidating the various concepts of weight have to do with the theory of relativity according to which gravity is modeled as a consequence of the curvature of spacetime. In the teaching community, a considerable debate has existed for over half a century on how to define weight for their students. The current situation is that a multiple set of concepts coexist and find use in their various contexts.

== History ==
Discussion of the concepts of heaviness (weight) and lightness (levity) date back to the ancient Greek philosophers. These were typically viewed as inherent properties of objects. Plato described weight as the natural tendency of objects to seek their kin. To Aristotle, weight and levity represented the tendency to restore the natural order of the basic elements: air, earth, fire and water. He ascribed absolute weight to earth and absolute levity to fire. Archimedes saw weight as a quality opposed to buoyancy, with the conflict between the two determining if an object sinks or floats. The first operational definition of weight was given by Euclid, who defined weight as: "the heaviness or lightness of one thing, compared to another, as measured by a balance." Operational balances (rather than definitions) had, however, been around much longer.

According to Aristotle, weight was the direct cause of the falling motion of an object, the speed of the falling object was supposed to be directly proportionate to the weight of the object. As medieval scholars discovered that in practice the speed of a falling object increased with time, this prompted a change to the concept of weight to maintain this cause-effect relationship. Weight was split into a "still weight" or pondus, which remained constant, and the actual gravity or gravitas, which changed as the object fell. The concept of gravitas was eventually replaced by Jean Buridan's impetus, a precursor to momentum.

The rise of the Copernican view of the world led to the resurgence of the Platonic idea that like objects attract but in the context of heavenly bodies. In the 17th century, Galileo made significant advances in the concept of weight. He proposed a way to measure the difference between the weight of a moving object and an object at rest. Ultimately, he concluded weight was proportionate to the amount of matter of an object, not the speed of motion as supposed by the Aristotelian view of physics.

=== Newton ===
The introduction of Newton's laws of motion and the development of Newton's law of universal gravitation led to considerable further development of the concept of weight. Weight became fundamentally separate from mass. Mass was identified as a fundamental property of objects connected to their inertia, while weight became identified with the force of gravity on an object and therefore dependent on the context of the object. In particular, Newton considered weight to be relative to another object causing the gravitational pull, e.g. the weight of the Earth towards the Sun.

Newton considered time and space to be absolute. This allowed him to consider concepts as true position and true velocity. Newton also recognized that weight as measured by the action of weighing was affected by environmental factors such as buoyancy. He considered this a false weight induced by imperfect measurement conditions, for which he introduced the term apparent weight as compared to the true weight defined by gravity.

Although Newtonian physics made a clear distinction between weight and mass, the term weight continued to be commonly used when people meant mass. This led the 3rd General Conference on Weights and Measures (CGPM) of 1901 to officially declare "The word weight denotes a quantity of the same nature as a force: the weight of a body is the product of its mass and the acceleration due to gravity", thus distinguishing it from mass for official usage.

=== Relativity ===
In the 20th century, the Newtonian concepts of absolute time and space were challenged by relativity. Einstein's equivalence principle put all observers, moving or accelerating, on the same footing. This led to an ambiguity as to what exactly is meant by the force of gravity and weight. A scale in an accelerating elevator cannot be distinguished from a scale in a gravitational field. Gravitational force and weight thereby became essentially frame-dependent quantities. This prompted the abandonment of the concept as superfluous in the fundamental sciences such as physics and chemistry. Nonetheless, the concept remained important in the teaching of physics. The ambiguities introduced by relativity led, starting in the 1960s, to considerable debate in the teaching community as how to define weight for their students, choosing between a nominal definition of weight as the force due to gravity or an operational definition defined by the act of weighing.

== Definitions ==
Several definitions exist for weight, not all of which are equivalent.

=== Gravitational definition ===
The most common definition of weight found in introductory physics textbooks defines weight as the force exerted on a body by gravity. This is often expressed in the formula W = mg, where W is the weight, m the mass of the object, and g gravitational acceleration.

In 1901, the 3rd General Conference on Weights and Measures (CGPM) established this as their official definition of weight:

The word weight denotes a quantity of the same nature (Note: The phrase "quantity of the same nature" is a literal translation of the French phrase grandeur de la même nature. Although this is an authorized translation, VIM 3 of the International Bureau of Weights and Measures recommends translating grandeurs de même nature as quantities of the same kind.) as a force: the weight of a body is the product of its mass and the acceleration due to gravity.

— Resolution 2 of the 3rd General Conference on Weights and Measures

This resolution defines weight as a vector, since force is a vector quantity. However, some textbooks also take weight to be a scalar by defining:

The weight W of a body is equal to the magnitude F_{g} of the gravitational force on the body.

The gravitational acceleration varies from place to place. Sometimes, it is simply taken to have a standard value of 9.80665 m/s^{2}, which gives the standard weight.

The force whose magnitude is equal to mg newtons is also known as the m kilogram weight (which term is abbreviated to kg-wt)

=== Operational definition ===
Measuring weight versus mass
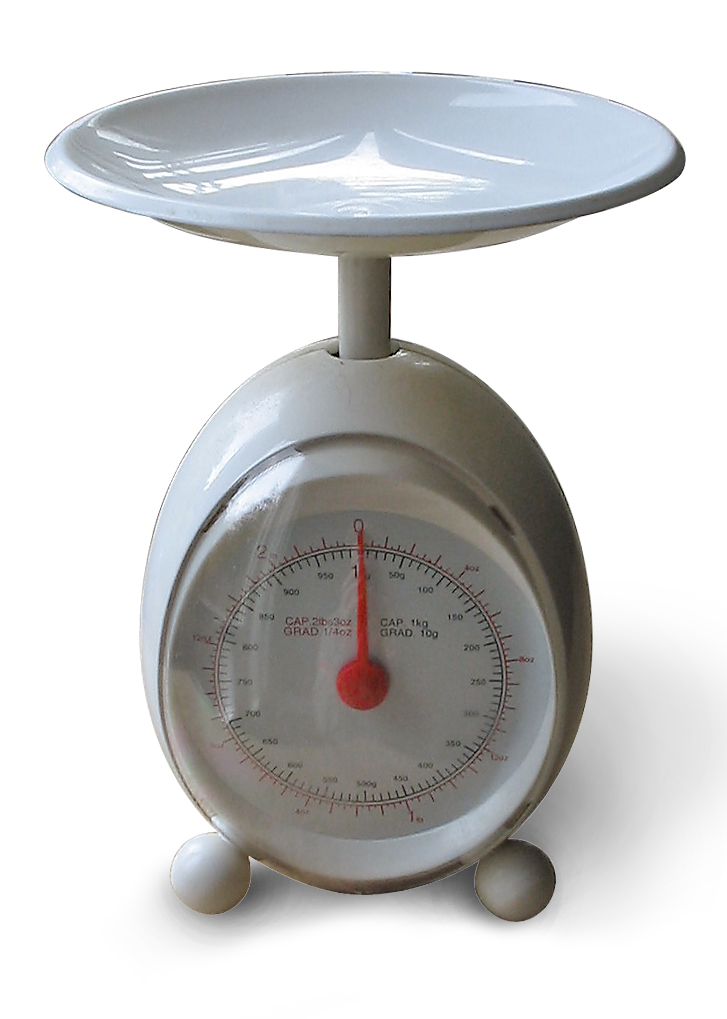
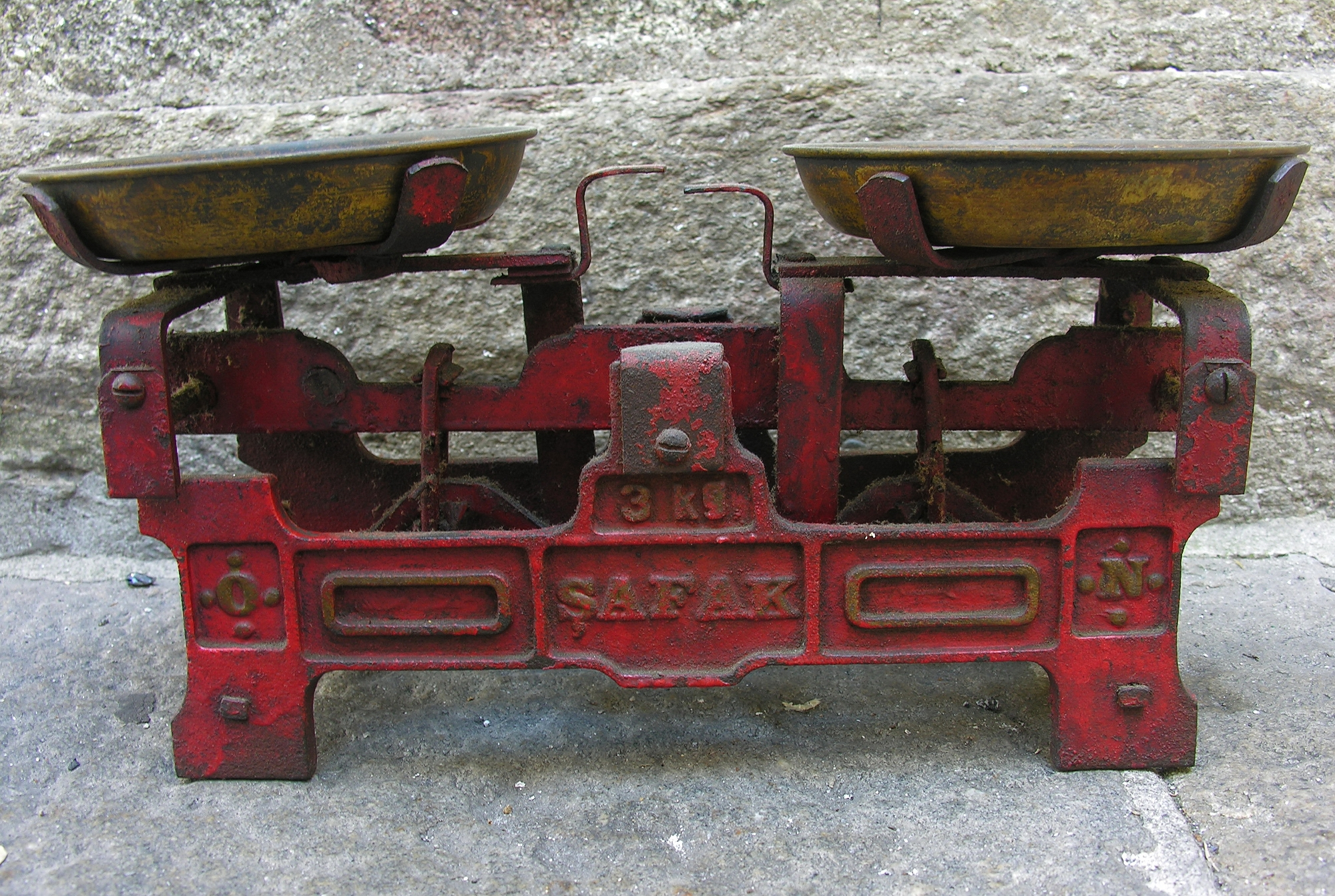
Left: A spring scale measures weight, by seeing how much the object pushes on a spring (inside the device). On the Moon, an object would give a lower reading. Right: A weighing scale indirectly measures mass, by comparing an object to references. On the Moon, an object would give the same reading, because the object and references would both become lighter.

In the operational definition, the weight of an object is the force measured by the operation of weighing it, which is the force it exerts on its support. Since W is the downward force on the body by the centre of Earth and there is no acceleration in the body, there exists an opposite and equal force by the support on the body. It is equal to the force exerted by the body on its support because action and reaction have same numerical value and opposite direction. This can make a considerable difference, depending on the details; for example, an object in free fall exerts little if any force on its support, a situation that is commonly referred to as weightlessness. However, being in free fall does not affect the weight according to the gravitational definition. Therefore, the operational definition is sometimes refined by requiring that the object be at rest. However, this raises the issue of defining "at rest" (usually being at rest with respect to the Earth is implied by using standard gravity). In the operational definition, the weight of an object at rest on the surface of the Earth is lessened by the effect of the centrifugal force from the Earth's rotation.

The operational definition, as usually given, does not explicitly exclude the effects of buoyancy, which reduces the measured weight of an object when it is immersed in a fluid such as air or water. As a result, a floating balloon or an object floating in water might be said to have zero weight.

=== ISO definition ===
In the ISO International standard ISO 80000-4:2006, describing the basic physical quantities and units in mechanics as a part of the International standard ISO/IEC 80000, the definition of weight is given as:

Definition

$$F_g = m g \,$$,
where m is mass and g is local acceleration of free fall.

Remarks

- When the reference frame is Earth, this quantity comprises not only the local gravitational force, but also the local centrifugal force due to the rotation of the Earth, a force which varies with latitude.
- The effect of atmospheric buoyancy is excluded in the weight.
- In common parlance, the name "weight" continues to be used where "mass" is meant, but this practice is deprecated.

— ISO 80000-4 (2006)

The definition is dependent on the chosen frame of reference. When the chosen frame is co-moving with the object in question then this definition precisely agrees with the operational definition. If the specified frame is the surface of the Earth, the weight according to the ISO and gravitational definitions differ only by the centrifugal effects due to the rotation of the Earth.

=== Apparent weight ===
In many real world situations the act of weighing may produce a result that differs from the ideal value provided by the definition used. This is usually referred to as the apparent weight of the object. For instance, when the gravitational definition of weight is used, the operational weight measured by an accelerating scale is often also referred to as the apparent weight. A common example of this is the effect of buoyancy, when an object is immersed in a fluid the displacement of the fluid will cause an upward force on the object, making it appear lighter when weighed on a scale. The apparent weight may be similarly affected by levitation and mechanical suspension.

== Mass ==
An object with mass m resting on a surface and the corresponding free body diagram of just the object showing the forces acting on it. The magnitude of force that the table is pushing upward on the object (the N vector) is equal to the downward force of the object's weight (shown here as mg, as weight is equal to the object's mass multiplied with the acceleration due to gravity): because these forces are equal, the object is in a state of equilibrium (all the forces and moments acting on it sum to zero).

In modern scientific usage, weight and mass are fundamentally different quantities: mass is an intrinsic property of matter, whereas weight is a force that results from the action of gravity on matter: it measures how strongly the force of gravity pulls on that matter. However, in most practical everyday situations the word "weight" is used when, strictly, "mass" is meant. For example, most people would say that an object "weighs one kilogram", even though the kilogram is a unit of mass.

The distinction between mass and weight is unimportant for many practical purposes because the strength of gravity does not vary too much on the surface of the Earth. In a uniform gravitational field, the gravitational force exerted on an object (its weight) is directly proportional to its mass. For example, object A weighs 10 times as much as object B, so therefore the mass of object A is 10 times greater than that of object B. This means that an object's mass can be measured indirectly by its weight, and so, for everyday purposes, weighing (using a weighing scale) is an entirely acceptable way of measuring mass. Similarly, a balance measures mass indirectly by comparing the weight of the measured item to that of an object(s) of known mass. Since the measured item and the comparison mass are in virtually the same location, so experiencing the same gravitational field, the effect of varying gravity does not affect the comparison or the resulting measurement.

The Earth's gravitational field is not uniform but can vary by as much as 0.5% at different locations on Earth. These variations alter the relationship between weight and mass, and must be taken into account in high-precision weight measurements that are intended to indirectly measure mass. Spring scales, which measure local weight, must be calibrated at the location at which the objects will be used to show this standard weight, to be legal for commerce.

This table shows the variation of acceleration due to gravity (and hence the variation of weight) at various locations on the Earth's surface.

Location	Latitude	m/s^{2}	Absolute difference from equator	Percentage difference from equator
Equator	0°	9.7803	0.0000	0%
Sydney	33°52′ S	9.7968	0.0165	0.17%
Aberdeen	57°9′ N	9.8168	0.0365	0.37%
North Pole	90° N	9.8322	0.0519	0.53%

The historical use of "weight" for "mass" also persists in some scientific terminology – for example, the chemical terms "atomic weight", "molecular weight", and "formula weight", can still be found rather than the preferred "atomic mass", etc.

In a different gravitational field, for example, on the surface of the Moon, an object can have a significantly different weight than on Earth. The gravity on the surface of the Moon is only about one-sixth as strong as on the surface of the Earth. A one-kilogram mass is still a one-kilogram mass (as mass is an intrinsic property of the object) but the downward force due to gravity, and therefore its weight, is only one-sixth of what the object would have on Earth. So a man of mass 180 pounds weighs only about 30 pounds-force when visiting the Moon.

=== SI units ===
In most modern scientific work, physical quantities are measured in SI units. The SI unit of weight is the same as that of force: the newton (N) – a derived unit which can also be expressed in SI base units as kg⋅m/s^{2} (kilograms times metres per second squared).

In commercial and everyday use, the term "weight" is usually used to mean mass, and the verb "to weigh" means "to determine the mass of" or "to have a mass of". Used in this sense, the proper SI unit is the kilogram (kg).

=== Pound and other non-SI units ===
In United States customary units, the pound can be either a unit of force or a unit of mass. Related units used in some distinct, separate subsystems of units include the poundal and the slug. The poundal is defined as the force necessary to accelerate an object of one-pound mass at 1 ft/s^{2}, and is equivalent to about 1/32.2 of a pound-force. The slug is defined as the amount of mass that accelerates at 1 ft/s^{2} when one pound-force is exerted on it, and is equivalent to about 32.2 pounds (mass).

The kilogram-force is a non-SI unit of force, defined as the force exerted by a one-kilogram mass in standard Earth gravity (equal to 9.80665 newtons exactly). The dyne is the cgs unit of force and is not a part of SI, while weights measured in the cgs unit of mass, the gram, remain a part of SI.

== Sensation ==
The sensation of weight is caused by the force exerted by fluids in the vestibular system, a three-dimensional set of tubes in the inner ear. It is actually the sensation of g-force, regardless of whether this is due to being stationary in the presence of gravity, or, if the person is in motion, the result of any other forces acting on the body such as in the case of acceleration or deceleration of a lift, or centrifugal forces when turning sharply.

== Measuring ==
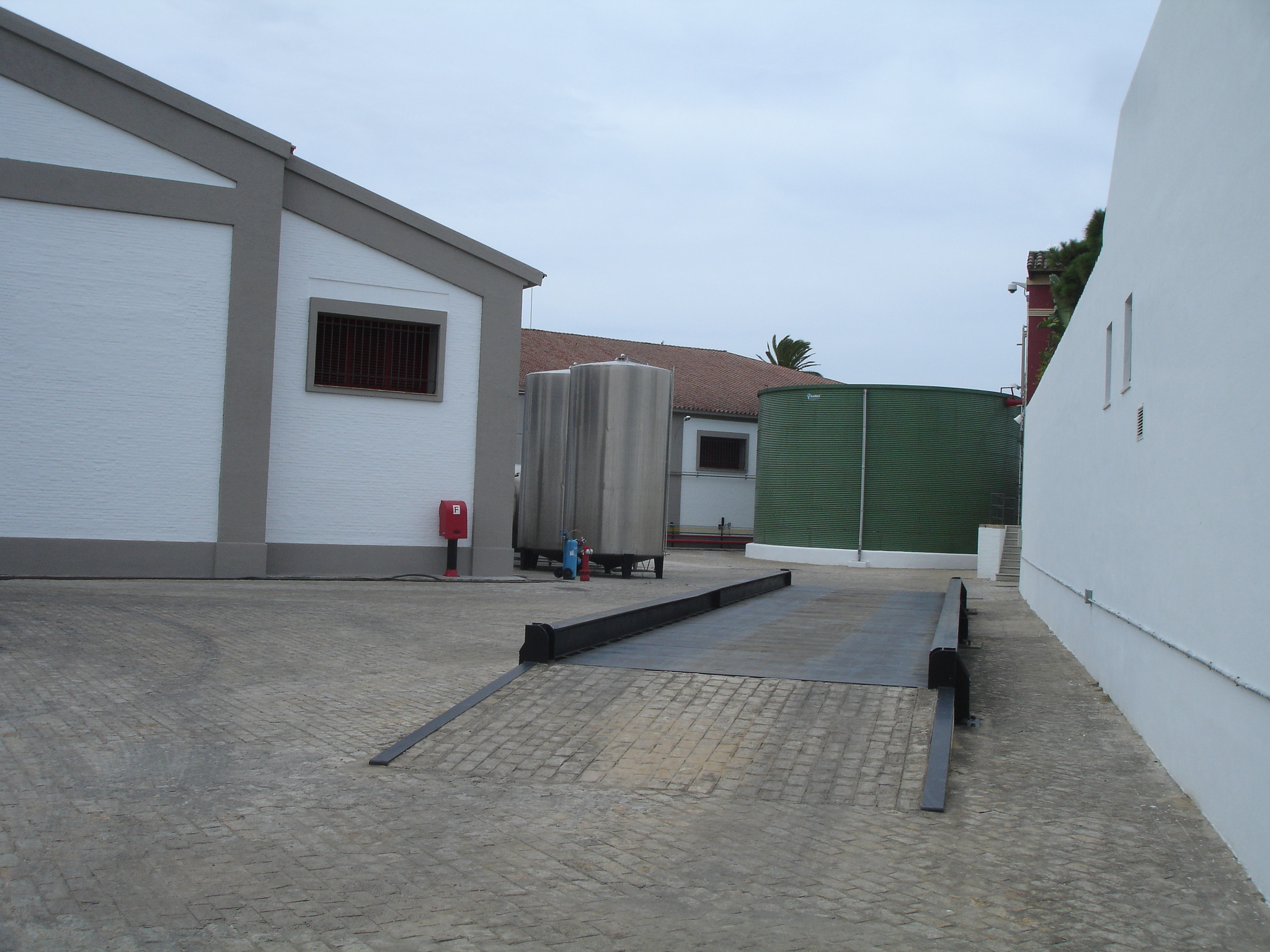
A weighbridge, used for weighing trucks

Weight is commonly measured using one of two methods. A spring scale or hydraulic or pneumatic scale measures local weight, the local force of gravity on the object (strictly apparent weight force). Since the local force of gravity can vary by up to 0.5% at different locations, spring scales will measure slightly different weights for the same object (the same mass) at different locations. To standardize weights, scales are always calibrated to read the weight an object would have at a nominal standard gravity of 9.80665 m/s^{2} (approx. 32.174 ft/s^{2}). However, this calibration is done at the factory. When the scale is moved to another location on Earth, the force of gravity will be different, causing a slight error. So to be highly accurate and legal for commerce, spring scales must be re-calibrated at the location at which they will be used.

A balance on the other hand, compares the weight of an unknown object in one scale pan to the weight of standard masses in the other, using a lever mechanism – a lever-balance. The standard masses are often referred to, non-technically, as "weights". Since any variations in gravity will act equally on the unknown and the known weights, a lever-balance will indicate the same value at any location on Earth. Therefore, balance "weights" are usually calibrated and marked in mass units, so the lever-balance measures mass by comparing the Earth's attraction on the unknown object and standard masses in the scale pans. In the absence of a gravitational field, away from planetary bodies (e.g. space), a lever-balance would not work, but on the Moon, for example, it would give the same reading as on Earth. Some balances are marked in weight units, but since the weights are calibrated at the factory for standard gravity, the balance will measure standard weight, i.e. what the object would weigh at standard gravity, not the actual local force of gravity on the object.

If the actual force of gravity on the object is needed, this can be calculated by multiplying the mass measured by the balance by the acceleration due to gravity – either standard gravity (for everyday work) or the precise local gravity (for precision work). Tables of the gravitational acceleration at different locations can be found on the web.

Gross weight is a term that is generally found in commerce or trade applications, and refers to the total weight of a product and its packaging. Conversely, net weight refers to the weight of the product alone, discounting the weight of its container or packaging; and tare weight is the weight of the packaging alone.

== Relative weights on the Earth and other celestial bodies ==
The table below shows comparative gravitational accelerations at the surface of the Sun, the Moon, and at each of the planets in the Solar System. The "surface" is taken to mean the cloud tops of the giant planets (Jupiter, Saturn, Uranus, and Neptune). For the Sun, the surface is taken to mean the photosphere. The values in the table have not been de-rated for the centrifugal effect of planet rotation (and cloud-top wind speeds for the giant planets) and therefore, generally speaking, are similar to the actual gravity that would be experienced near the poles.

Body	Multiple of Earth gravity	Surface gravity m/s^{2}
Sun	27.90	274.1
Mercury	0.3770	3.703
Venus	0.9032	8.872
Earth	1 (by definition)	9.8226
Moon	0.1655	1.625
Mars	0.3895	3.728
Jupiter	2.640	25.93
Saturn	1.139	11.19
Uranus	0.917	9.01
Neptune	1.148	11.28

== See also ==
- Human body weight – Person's mass or weight
- Specific weight – Weight per unit volume of a material
- Tare weight
- weight – Unit of weight the English unit
- List of weights
