= Caesium standard =

Primary frequency standard

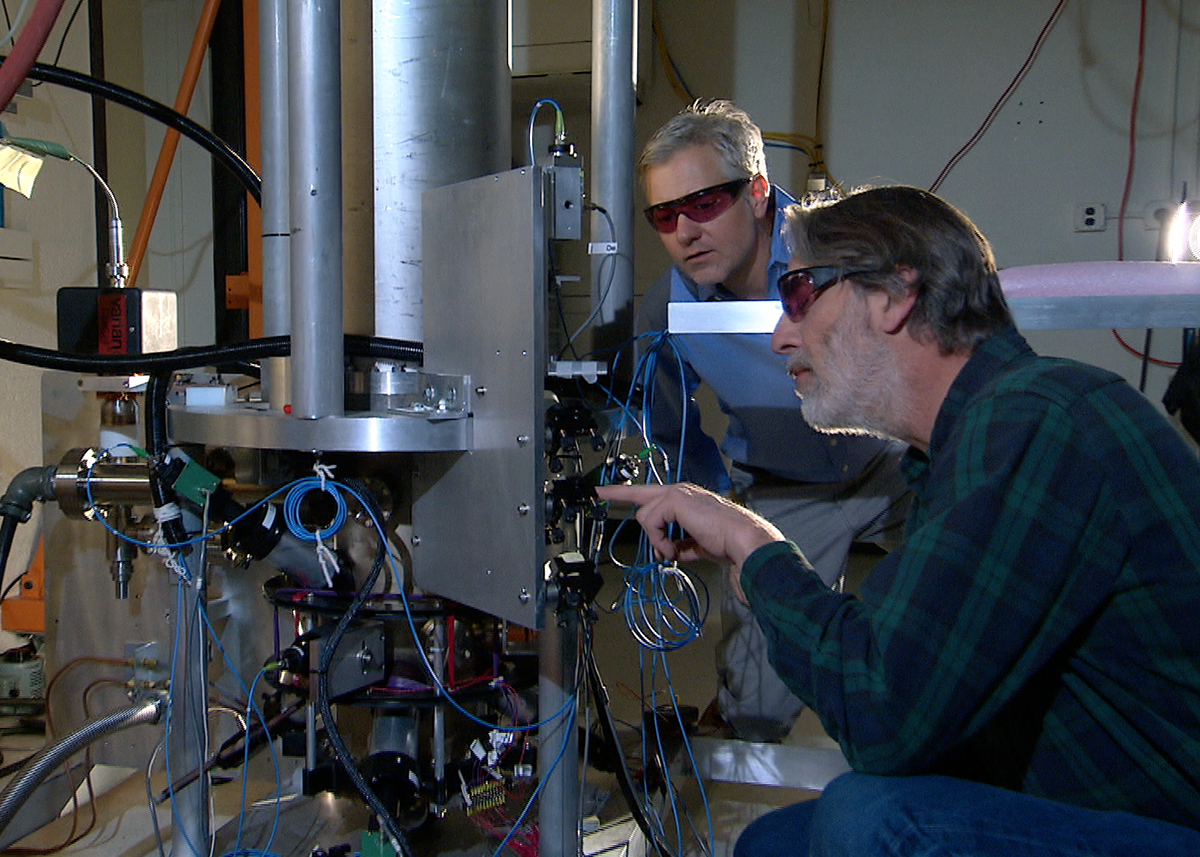
A caesium atomic fountain used as part of an atomic clock

The caesium standard is a primary frequency standard in which the photon absorption by transitions between the two hyperfine ground states of caesium-133 atoms is used to control the output frequency. The first caesium clock was built by Louis Essen in 1955 at the National Physical Laboratory in the UK and promoted worldwide by Gernot M. R. Winkler of the United States Naval Observatory.

Caesium atomic clocks are one of the most accurate time and frequency standards, and serve as the primary standard for the definition of the second in the International System of Units (SI), the modern metric system. By definition, radiation produced by the transition between the two hyperfine ground states of caesium-133 (in the absence of external influences such as the Earth's magnetic field) has a frequency, Δν_{Cs}, of exactly 9192631770 Hz. That value was chosen so that the caesium second equaled, to the limit of measuring ability in 1960 when it was adopted, the existing standard ephemeris second based on the Earth's orbit around the Sun. Because no other measurement involving time had been as precise, the effect of the change was less than the experimental uncertainty of all existing measurements.

While the second is the only base unit to be explicitly defined in terms of the caesium standard, the majority of SI units have definitions that mention either the second, or other units defined using the second. Consequently, every base unit except the mole and every named derived unit except the coulomb, gray, sievert, radian, and steradian have values that are implicitly at least partially defined by the properties of the caesium-133 hyperfine transition radiation. And of these, all but the mole, the coulomb, and the dimensionless radian and steradian are implicitly defined by the general properties of electromagnetic radiation.

== Technical details ==
The official definition of the second was first given by the BIPM at the 13th General Conference on Weights and Measures in 1967 as: "The second is the duration of 9192631770 periods of the radiation corresponding to the transition between the two hyperfine levels of the ground state of the caesium 133 atom." At its 1997 meeting the BIPM added to the previous definition the following specification: "This definition refers to a caesium atom at rest at a temperature of 0 K."

The BIPM restated this definition in its 26th conference (2018), "The second is defined by taking the fixed numerical value of the caesium frequency ∆νCs, the unperturbed ground-state hyperfine transition frequency of the caesium 133 atom, to be 9 192 631 770 when expressed in the unit Hz, which is equal to s^{−1}."

The meaning of the preceding definition is as follows. The caesium atom has a ground state electron state with configuration [Xe] 6s^{1} and, consequently, atomic term symbol ^{2}S_{1/2}. This means that there is one unpaired electron and the total electron spin of the atom is 1/2. Moreover, the nucleus of caesium-133 has a nuclear spin equal to 7/2. The simultaneous presence of electron spin and nuclear spin leads, by a mechanism called hyperfine interaction, to a (small) splitting of all energy levels into two sub-levels. One of the sub-levels corresponds to the electron and nuclear spin being parallel (i.e., pointing in the same direction), leading to a total spin F equal to F = 7/2 + 1/2 = 4; the other sub-level corresponds to anti-parallel electron and nuclear spin (i.e., pointing in opposite directions), leading to a total spin F = 7/2 − 1/2 = 3. In the caesium atom it so happens that the sub-level lowest in energy is the one with F = 3, while the F = 4 sub-level lies energetically slightly above. When the atom is irradiated with electromagnetic radiation having an energy corresponding to the energetic difference between the two sub-levels the radiation is absorbed and the atom is excited, going from the F = 3 sub-level to the F = 4 one. After some time the atom will re-emit the radiation and return to its F = 3 ground state. From the definition of the second it follows that the radiation in question has a frequency of exactly 9.19263177 GHz, corresponding to a wavelength of about 3.26 cm and therefore belonging to the microwave range.

A common confusion involves the conversion from angular frequency ($\omega$) to frequency ($f$), or vice versa. Angular frequencies are conventionally given as s^{−1} in scientific literature, but here the units implicitly mean radians per second. In contrast, the unit Hz should be interpreted as cycles per second. The conversion formula is $\omega = 2\pi f$, which implies that 1 Hz corresponds to an angular frequency of approximately 6.28 radians per second (or 6.28 s^{−1} where radians is omitted for brevity by convention).

== Parameters and significance in the second and other SI units ==
Suppose the caesium standard has the parameters:

- Velocity: c
- Energy/frequency: h
- Time period: Δt_{Cs}
- Frequency: Δν_{Cs}
- Wavelength: Δλ_{Cs}
- Photon energy: ΔE_{Cs}
- Photon mass equivalent: ΔM_{Cs}

=== Time and frequency ===
The first set of units defined using the caesium standard were those relating to time, with the second being defined in 1967 as "the duration of 9 192 631 770 periods of the radiation corresponding to the transition between the two hyperfine levels of the ground state of the caesium 133 atom" meaning that:

- 1 second, s, = 9,192,631,770 Δt_{Cs}
- 1 hertz, Hz, = 1/s = Δν_{Cs}/9,192,631,770
- 1 becquerel, Bq, = 1 nuclear decay/s = 1/9,192,631,770 nuclear decays/Δt_{Cs}

This also linked the definitions of the derived units relating to force and energy (see below) and of the ampere, whose definition at the time made reference to the newton, to the caesium standard. Before 1967 the SI units of time and frequency were defined using the tropical year and before 1960 by the length of the mean solar day

=== Length ===
In 1983, the meter was, indirectly, defined in terms of the caesium standard with the formal definition "The metre is the length of the path travelled by light in vacuum during a time interval of 1/299 792 458 of a second." This implied:

- 1 metre, m, = (c s)/299,792,458 = 9,192,631,770/299,792,458 c Δt_{Cs} = 9,192,631,770/299,792,458 Δλ_{Cs}
- 1 radian, rad, = 1 m/m = Δλ_{Cs}/Δλ_{Cs} = 1 (dimensionless unit of angle)
- 1 steradian, sr, = 1 m^{2}/m^{2} = Δλ_{Cs}^{2}/Δλ_{Cs}^{2} = 1 (dimensionless unit of solid angle)

Between 1960 and 1983, the metre had been defined by the wavelength of a different transition frequency associated with the krypton-86 atom. This had a much higher frequency and shorter wavelength than the caesium standard, falling inside the visible spectrum. The first definition, used between 1889 and 1960, was by the international prototype meter.

=== Mass, energy, and force ===
Following the 2019 revision of the SI, electromagnetic radiation, in general, was explicitly defined to have the exact parameters:

- c = 299,792,458 m/s
- h = 6.62607015×10^{−34} J s

The caesium-133 hyperfine transition radiation was explicitly defined to have frequency:

- Δν_{Cs} = 9,192,631,770 Hz

Though the above values for c and Δν_{Cs} were already obviously implicit in the definitions of the metre and second. Together they imply:

- Δt_{Cs} = 1/Δν_{Cs} = s/9,192,631,770
- Δλ_{Cs} = c Δt_{Cs} = 299,792,458/9,192,631,770 m
- ΔE_{Cs} = h Δν_{Cs} = 9,192,631,770 Hz × 6.62607015×10^{−34} J⋅s = 6.09110229711386655×10^{−24} J
- ΔM_{Cs} = ΔE_{Cs}/c^{2} = (6.09110229711386655×10^{−24} J)/(8.9875517873681764×10^{16} m^{2}/s^{2}) = 6.09110229711386655/8.9875517873681764×10^{40} kg

Notably, the wavelength has a fairly human-sized value of about 3.26 centimetres and the photon energy is surprisingly close to the average molecular kinetic energy per degree of freedom per kelvin. From these it follows that:

- 1 kilogram, kg, = 8.9875517873681764×10^{40}/6.09110229711386655 ΔM_{Cs}
- 1 joule, J, = 10^{24}/6.09110229711386655 ΔE_{Cs}
- 1 watt, W, = 1 J/s = 10^{14}/5.59932604907689089550702935 ΔE_{Cs} Δν_{Cs}
- 1 newton, N, = 1 J/m = 2.99792458×10^{22}/5.59932604907689089550702935 ΔE_{Cs}/Δλ_{Cs}
- 1 pascal, Pa, = 1 N/m^{2} = 2.6944002417373989539335912×10^{19}/4.73168129737820913189287698892486811451620615 ΔE_{Cs}/Δλ_{Cs}^{3}
- 1 gray, Gy, = 1 J/kg = 1/89,875,517,873,681,764 ΔE_{Cs}/ΔM_{Cs} = c^{2}/89,875,517,873,681,764
- 1 sievert, Sv, = the ionizing radiation dose equivalent to 1 gray of gamma rays

Prior to the revision, between 1889 and 2019, the family of metric (and later SI) units relating to mass, force, and energy were somewhat notoriously defined by the mass of the International Prototype of the Kilogram (IPK), a specific object stored at the headquarters of the International Bureau of Weights and Measures in Paris, meaning that any change to the mass of that object would have resulted in a change to the size of the kilogram and of the many other units whose value at the time depended on that of the kilogram.

=== Temperature ===
From 1954 to 2019, the SI temperature scales were defined using the triple point of water and absolute zero. The 2019 revision replaced these with an assigned value for the Boltzmann constant, k, of 1.380649×10^{−23} J/K, implying:

- 1 kelvin, K, = 1.380649×10^{−23} J/2 per degree of freedom = (1.380649×10^{−23} J/K)/(2 × 6.09110229711386655×10^{−24} J) ΔE_{Cs} per degree of freedom = 1.380649/1.21822045942277331 ΔE_{Cs} per degree of freedom
- Temperature in degrees Celsius, °C, = temperature in kelvins − 273.15 = (1.21822045942277331 × kinetic energy per degree of freedom − 377.12427435 ΔE_{Cs})/(1.380649 ΔE_{Cs})

=== Amount of substance ===
The mole is an extremely large number of "elementary entities" (i.e. atoms, molecules, ions, etc). From 1969 to 2019, this number was 0.012 × the mass ratio between the IPK and a carbon 12 atom. The 2019 revision simplified this by assigning the Avogadro constant the exact value 6.02214076×10^{23} elementary entities per mole, thus, uniquely among the base units, the mole maintained its independence from the caesium standard:

- 1 mole, mol, = 6.02214076×10^{23} elementary entities
- 1 katal, kat, = 1 mol/s = 6.02214076×10^{14}/9.19263177 elementary entities/Δt_{Cs}

=== Electromagnetic units ===
Prior to the revision, the ampere was defined as the current needed to produce a force between 2 parallel wires 1 m apart of 0.2 μN per meter. The 2019 revision replaced this definition by giving the charge on the electron, e, the exact value 1.602176634×10^{−19} coulombs. Somewhat incongruously, the coulomb is still considered a derived unit and the ampere a base unit, rather than vice versa. In any case, this convention entailed the following exact relationships between the SI electromagnetic units, elementary charge, and the caesium-133 hyperfine transition radiation:

- 1 coulomb, C, = 10^{19}/1.602176634 e
- 1 ampere, or amp, A, = 1 C/s = 10^{9}/1.472821982686006218 e Δν_{Cs}
- 1 volt, V, = 1 J/C = 1.602176634×10^{5}/6.09110229711386655 ΔE_{Cs}/e
- 1 farad, F, = 1 C/V = 6.09110229711386655×10^{14}/2.566969966535569956 e^{2}/ΔE_{Cs}
- 1 ohm, Ω, = 1 V/A = (2.359720966701071721258310212×10^{−4})/6.09110229711386655 ΔE_{Cs}/Δν_{Cs} e^{2} = (2.359720966701071721258310212×10^{−4})/6.09110229711386655 h/e^{2}
- 1 siemens, S, = 1/Ω = 6.09110229711386655×10^{4}/2.359720966701071721258310212 e^{2}/h
- 1 weber, Wb, = 1 V s = 1.602176634×10^{15}/6.62607015 ΔE_{Cs} Δt_{Cs}/e = 1.602176634×10^{15}/6.62607015 h/e
- 1 tesla, T, = 1 Wb/m^{2} = 1.43996454705862285832702376×10^{12}/5.59932604907689089550702935 ΔE_{Cs} Δt_{Cs}/e Δλ_{Cs}^{2} = 1.43996454705862285832702376×10^{12}/5.59932604907689089550702935 E/e c Δλ_{Cs}
- 1 henry, H, = Ω s = 2.359720966701071721258310212×10^{6}/6.62607015 h Δt_{Cs}/e^{2}

=== Optical units ===
From 1967 to 1979 the SI optical units, lumen, lux, and candela are defined using the incandescent glow of platinum at its melting point. After 1979, the candela was defined as the luminous intensity of a monochromatic visible light source of frequency 540 THz (i.e 6000/1.02140353 that of the caesium standard) and radiant intensity 1/683 watts per steradian. This linked the definition of the candela to the caesium standard and, until 2019, to the IPK. Unlike the units relating to mass, energy, temperature, amount of substance, and electromagnetism, the optical units were not massively redefined in 2019, though they were indirectly affected since their values depend on that of the watt, and hence of the kilogram. The frequency used to define the optical units has the parameters:

- Frequency: 540 THz
- Time period: 50/27 fs
- Wavelength: 14.9896229/27 μm
- Photon energy: 5.4×10^{14} Hz × 6.62607015×10^{−34} J s = 3.578077881×10^{−19} J
- luminous efficacy, K_{CD}, = 683 lm/W
- luminous energy per photon, $Q_\mathrm v$, = 3.578077881×10^{−19} J × 683 lm/W = 2.443827192723×10^{−16} lm s

This implies:

- 1 lumen, lm, = 10^{6}/2.246520349221536260971 $Q_\mathrm v$ Δν_{Cs}
- 1 candela, cd, = 1 lm/sr = 10^{6}/2.246520349221536260971 $Q_\mathrm v$ Δν_{Cs}/sr
- 1 lux, lx, = 1 lm/m^{2} = 8.9875517873681764×10^{2}/1.898410313566852566340456048807087002459 $Q_\mathrm v$ Δν_{Cs}/Δλ_{Cs}^{2}

=== Summary ===
The parameters of the caesium-133 hyperfine transition radiation expressed exactly in SI units are:

- Frequency = 9,192,631,770 Hz
- Time period = 1/9,192,631,770 s
- Wavelength = 299,792,458/9,192,631,770 m
- Photon energy = 6.09110229711386655×10^{−24} J
- Photon mass equivalent = (6.09110229711386655×10^{−40})/8.9875517873681764 kg

If the seven base units of the SI are expressed explicitly in terms of the SI defining constants, they are:

- 1 second = 9,192,631,770/Δν_{Cs}
- 1 metre = 9,192,631,770/299,792,458 c/Δν_{Cs}
- 1 kilogram = 8.9875517873681764×10^{40}/6.09110229711386655 h Δν_{Cs}/c^{2}
- 1 ampere = 10^{9}/1.472821982686006218 e Δν_{Cs}
- 1 kelvin = 13.80649/6.09110229711386655 h Δν_{Cs}/k
- 1 mole = 6.02214076×10^{23} elementary entities
- 1 candela = 10^{11}/3.82433969151951648163130104605 h Δν_{Cs}^{2} K_{CD}/sr

Ultimately, 6 of the 7 base units (all but the dimensionless mole) notably have values that depend on that of Δν_{Cs}, which appears far more often than any of the other defining constants. However, the derived unit of one coulomb, which is an ampere-second, is a dimensionful unit defined purely in terms of the elementary charge and hence is independent of Δν_{Cs}.

== See also ==
- Rubidium standard
- Nuclear clock
