= Gram =

Metric unit of mass

gram
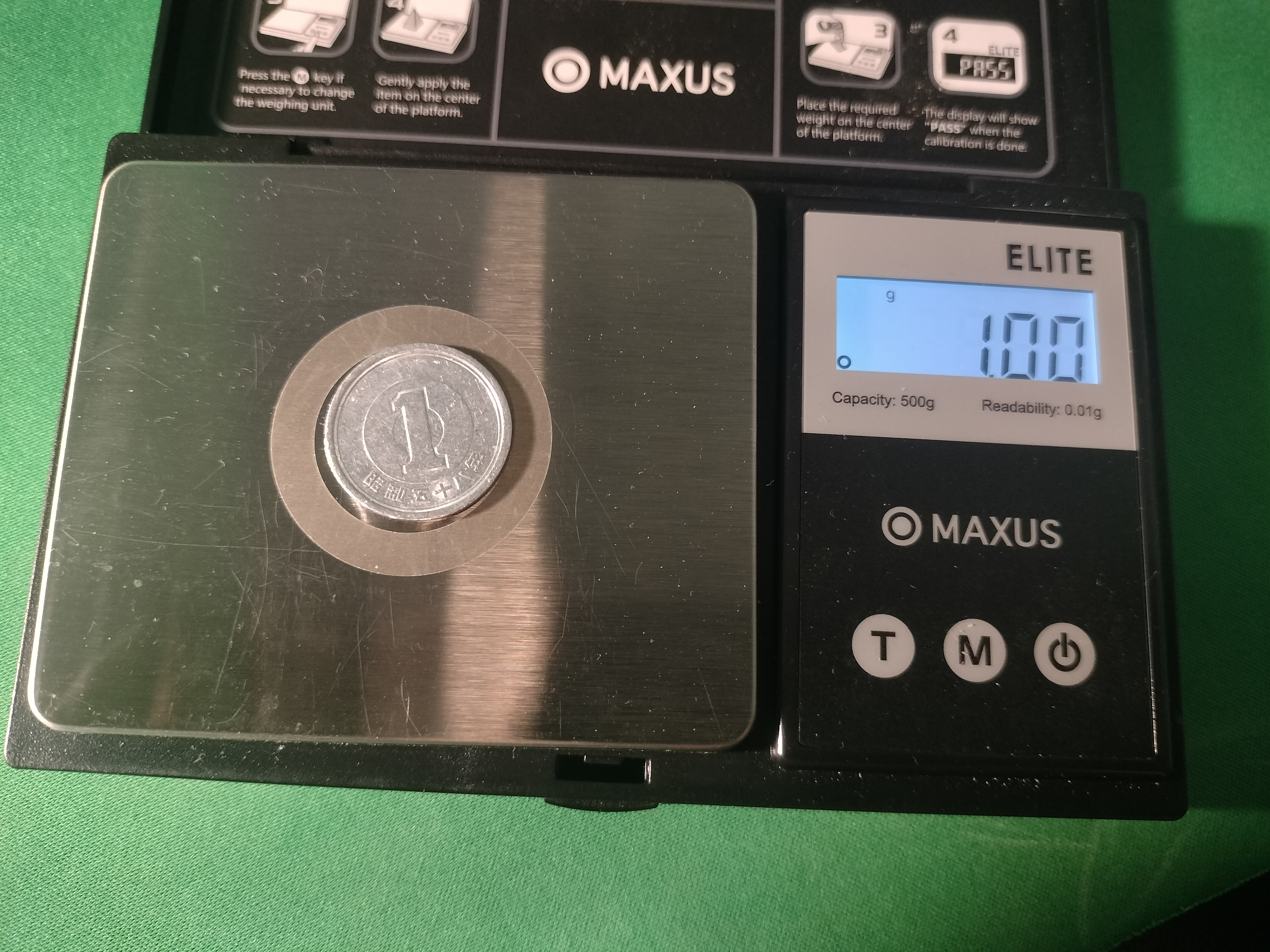
- The mass of this Japanese one yen coin is 1.00 gram. A weight scale such as this can give an accurate reading of mass for many objects (see Weight vs. mass).

General information
- Unit system: SI
- Unit of: Mass
- Symbol: g

Conversions
| 1 g in ... | ... is equal to ... |
- SI base units: 10^{−3} kilograms
- Imperial units U.S. customary: 0.0352740 ounces
- daltons: 6.02214076×10^{23} Da

The gram (originally gramme; SI unit symbol g) is a unit of mass in the International System of Units (SI) equal to one thousandth of a kilogram.

Originally defined in 1795 as "the absolute weight of a volume of pure water equal to the cube of the hundredth part of a metre [1 cm^{3}], and at the temperature of melting ice", the defining temperature (0 °C) was later changed to the temperature of maximum density of water (approximately 4 °C). Subsequent redefinitions agree with this original definition to within 30 parts per million (0.003%), with the maximum density of water remaining very close to 1 g/cm^{3}, as shown by modern measurements.

By the late 19th century, there was an effort to make the base unit the kilogram and the gram a derived unit. In 1960, the new International System of Units defined a gram as one thousandth of a kilogram (i.e., one gram is 1×10^{−3} kg). The kilogram, as of 2019, is defined by the International Bureau of Weights and Measures from the metre, the second, and from the fixed numerical value of the Planck constant (h).

== Official SI symbol ==
The only unit symbol for gram that is recognised by the International System of Units (SI) is "g" following the numeric value with a space, as in "640 g" to stand for "640 grams" in the English language. The SI disallows use of abbreviations such as "gr" (which is the symbol for grains), "gm" ("g⋅m" is the SI symbol for gram-metre) or "Gm" (the SI symbol for gigametre).

== History ==
The word gramme was adopted by the French National Convention in its 1795 decree revising the metric system as replacing the gravet (introduced in 1793 simultaneously with a base measure called grave, of which gravet was a subdivision). Its definition remained that of the mass (then called weight) of a cubic centimetre of water.

French gramme was taken from the Late Latin term gramma. This word—ultimately from Greek γράμμα (grámma), "letter"—had adopted a specialised meaning in Late Antiquity of "one twenty-fourth part of an ounce" (two oboli), corresponding to about 1.14 modern grams. This use of the term is found in the carmen de ponderibus et mensuris ("poem about weights and measures") composed around 400 AD. (Note: The date and authorship of this Late Latin didactic poem are both uncertain; it was attributed to Priscian but is now attributed to Rem(m)ius Favinus/Flav(in)us. The poem's title is reflected in the French phrase poids et mesures ("weights and measures") in the title of the 1795 National Convention decree, Décret relatif aux poids et aux mesures that introduced the gram, and indirectly in the name of the General Conference on Weights and Measures responsible for the modern definition of the metric units.) There is also evidence that the Greek γράμμα was used in the same sense at around the same time, in the 4th century, and survived in this sense into Medieval Greek, while the Latin term died out in Medieval Latin and was recovered in Renaissance scholarship. (Note: In the Renaissance, the carmen de ponderibus et mensuris was received as a work of the 1st-century grammarian Remmius Palaemon edited in 1528 by Johann Setzer of Hagenau, together with works by Celsius, Priscian and Johannes Caesarius; Aurelij Cornelij Celsi, De re medica, libri octo eruditissimi. Q. Sereni Samonici Praecepta medica, uersibus hexametris. Q. Rhemnij Fannij Palaemonis, De ponderibus [et] mensuris, liber rarus [et] utilissimus)

The gram was the base unit of mass in the 19th-century centimetre–gram–second system of units (CGS). The CGS system coexisted with the metre–kilogram–second system of units (MKS), first proposed in 1901, during much of the 20th century, but the gram was displaced by the kilogram as the base unit for mass when the MKS system was chosen for the SI base units in 1960.

== Uses ==
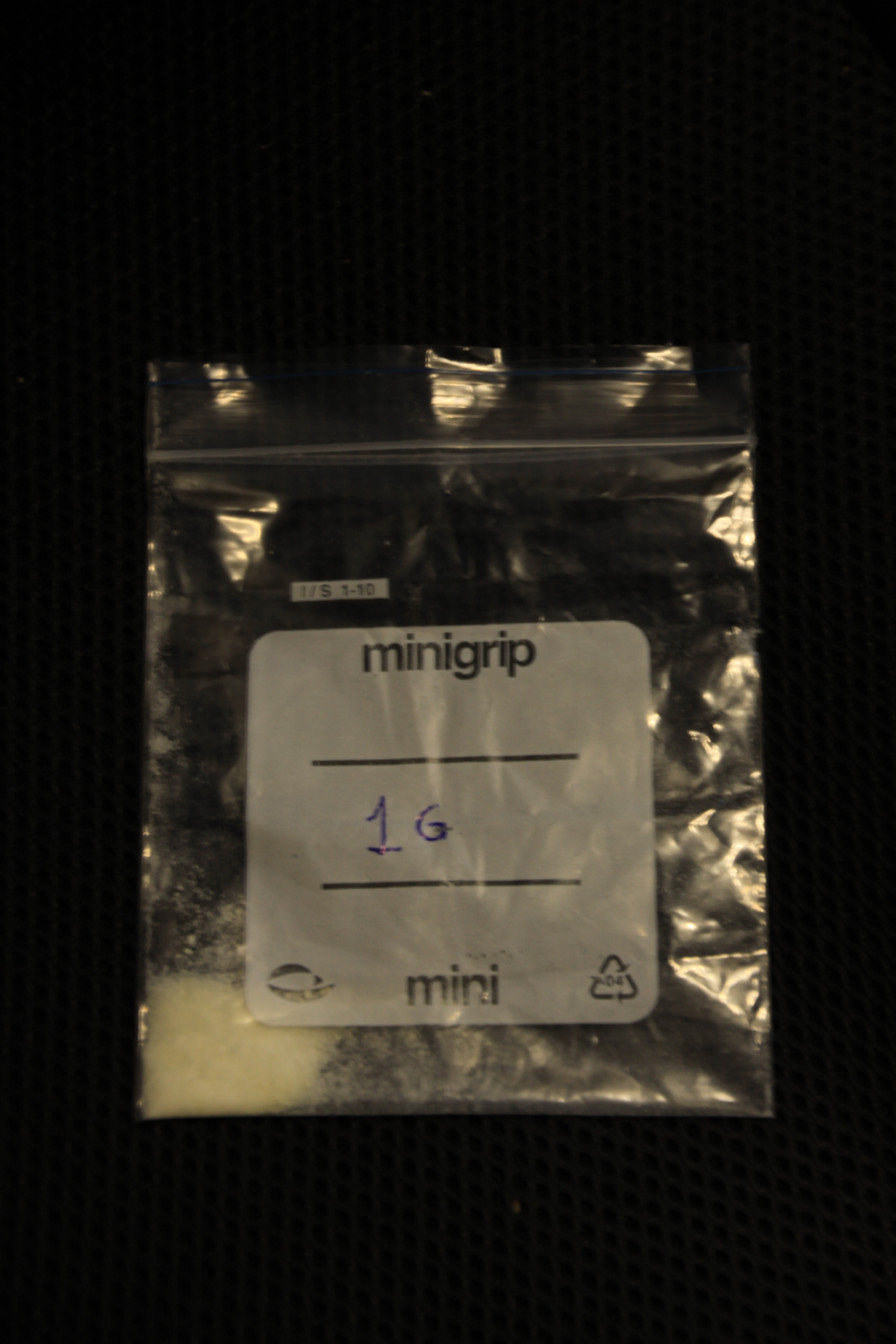
One gram of amphetamines (the unit often used for street retail)

The gram is the most widely used unit of measurement for non-liquid ingredients in cooking and grocery shopping worldwide. Liquid ingredients are often measured by volume rather than mass.

Many standards and legal requirements for nutrition labels on food products require relative contents to be stated per 100 g of the product, such that the resulting figure can also be read as a percentage by mass.

== Conversion factors ==
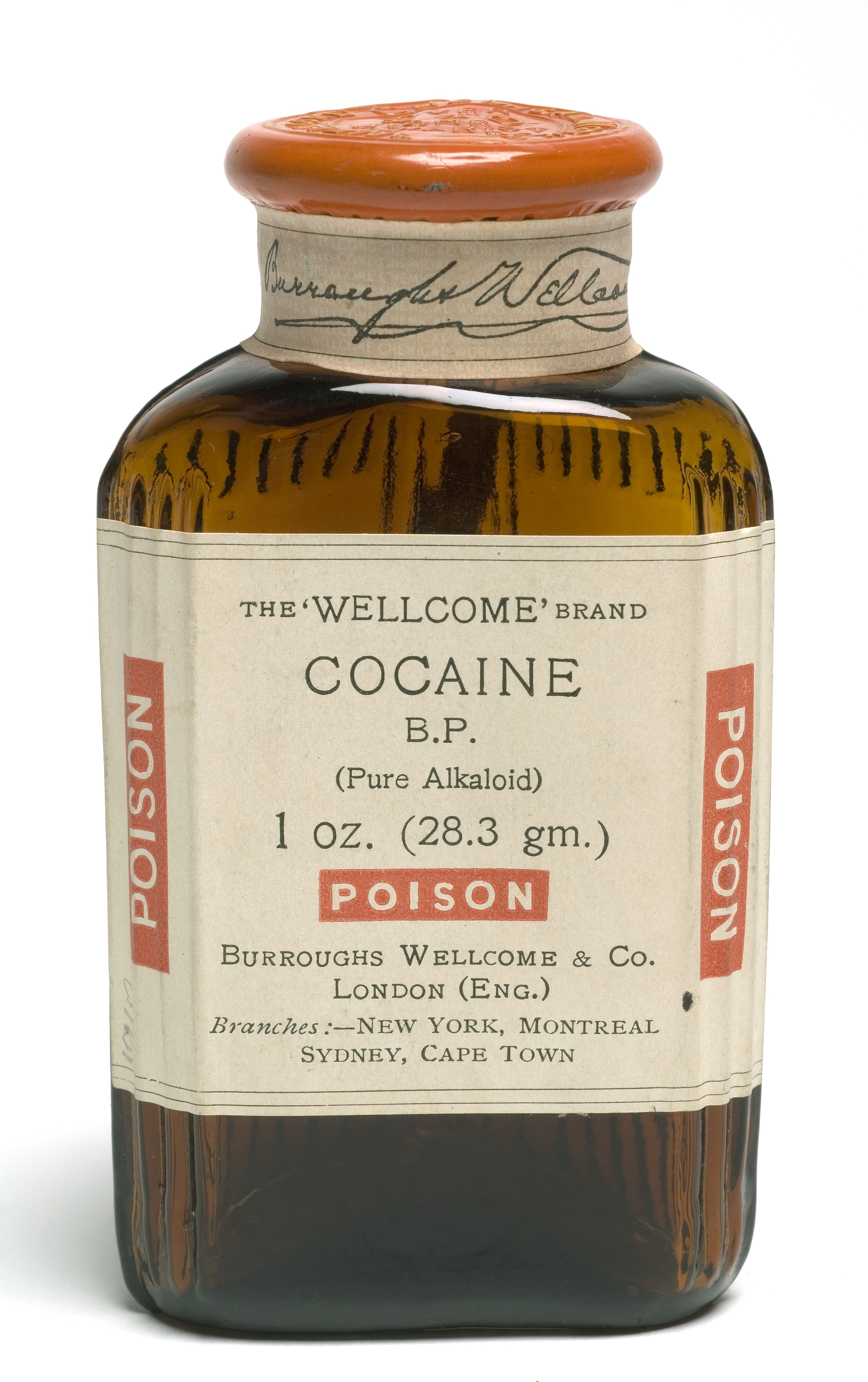
A container of Wellcome-brand cocaine, containing 1 avoirdupois ounce or 28.3 grams (note the non-standard abbreviation gm.).

- 1 gram (g) ≈ 15.43236 grains (gr)
- 1 grain (gr) = 0.06479891 g (exactly, by definition)
- 1 avoirdupois ounce (oz) = 28.349523125 g (7000/16 or 437.5 gr)
- 1 troy ounce (ozt) = 31.1034768 g (480 gr)
- 100 grams (g) ≈ 3.52740 ounces (oz)
- 1 carat (ct) = 0.2 grams
- 1 gamma (γ) = 10^{−6} grams
- 1 undecimogramme = 1 "eleventh-gram" = 10^{−11} grams in the historical quadrant–eleventh-gram–second system (QES system) a.k.a. hebdometre–undecimogramme–second system (HUS system)
- 500 grams (g) = 1 jin in the Chinese units of measurement.

== Comparisons ==
- 1 gram is roughly equal to the mass of 1 small paper clip or pen cap.
- The Japanese 1 yen coin has a mass of 1 gram, lighter than the British penny (3.56 g), the United States penny (2.5 g), the Euro cent (2.30 g), and the Australian 5 cent coin (2.80 g).

== See also ==
- Conversion of units
- Duella
- Gold gram
- Orders of magnitude (mass)
