= Kilogram =

Metric unit of mass

kilogram
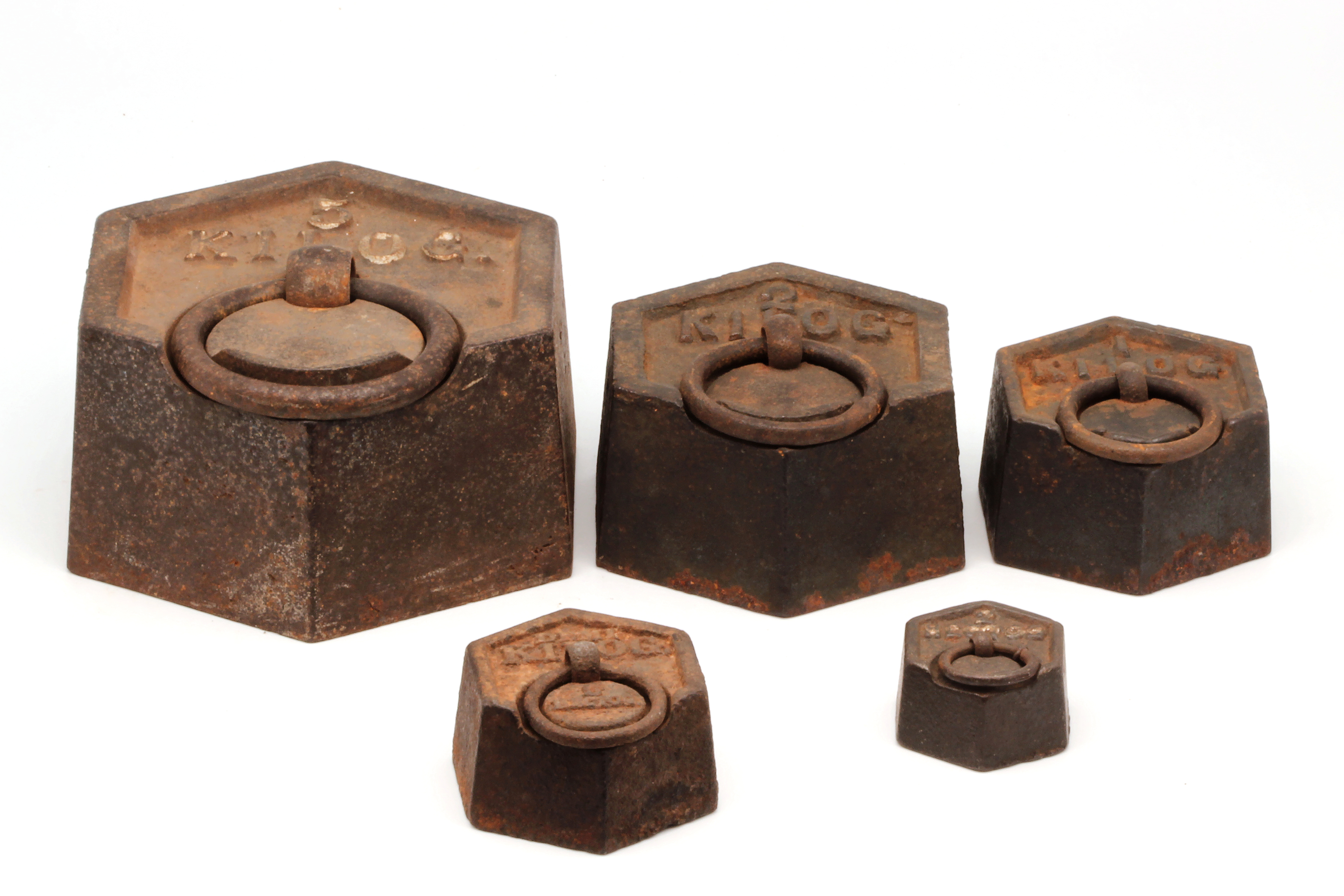
- A series of 5, 2, 1, 0.5 and 0.2 kilogram weights, made of cast iron

General information
- Unit system: SI
- Unit of: mass
- Symbol: kg

Conversions
1 kg in ...	... is equal to ...
- Avoirdupois: ≈ 2.2046 pounds (Note: The avoirdupois pound is part of both United States customary system of units and the Imperial system of units. It is defined as exactly 0.45359237 kilograms.); ≈ 35.274 oz
- British Gravitational: ≈ 0.0685 slugs
- Atomic-scale: 6.0221407537(19)×10^{26} Da

The kilogram (also spelled kilogramme) is the base unit of mass in the International System of Units (SI), equal to one thousand grams. It has the unit symbol kg. The word "kilogram" is formed from the combination of the metric prefix kilo- (meaning one thousand) and gram; it is commonly shortened to "kilo" (plural "kilos").

The kilogram is an SI base unit, defined ultimately in terms of three defining constants of the SI, namely a specific transition frequency of the caesium-133 atom, the speed of light, and the Planck constant. A properly equipped metrology laboratory can calibrate a mass measurement instrument such as a Kibble balance as a primary standard for the kilogram mass.

The kilogram was originally defined in 1795 during the French Revolution as the mass of one litre of water at 0 °C. This definition was later adjusted to the temperature at which water reaches its maximum density, approximately 4 °C. The current definition of a kilogram agrees with this original definition to within 30 parts per million (0.003%). In 1799, the platinum Kilogramme des Archives replaced it as the standard of mass. In 1889, a cylinder composed of platinum–iridium, the International Prototype of the Kilogram (IPK), became the standard of the unit of mass for the metric system and remained so for 130 years, before the current definition was adopted in 2019.

== Definition ==
The kilogram is defined in terms of three defining constants:

- a specific atomic transition frequency Δν_{Cs}, which defines the duration of the second,
- the speed of light in vacuum c, which when combined with the second, defines the length of the metre,
- and the Planck constant h, which when combined with the metre and second, defines the mass of the kilogram.

The formal definition according to the General Conference on Weights and Measures (CGPM) is:

The kilogram, symbol kg, is the SI unit of mass. It is defined by taking the fixed numerical value of the Planck constant h to be 6.62607015×10^{−34} when expressed in the unit J⋅s, which is equal to kg⋅m^{2}⋅s^{−1}, where the metre and the second are defined in terms of c and Δν_{Cs}.

— CGPM

Defined in term of those units, the kg is formulated as:

kg = (299792458)^{2}/((6.62607015×10^{−34})(9192631770))hΔν_{Cs}/c^{2}
≈ (1.4755214×10^{40})hΔν_{Cs}/c^{2}.

This definition is generally consistent with previous definitions: the kilogram remains within 30 parts per million (0.003%) of the mass of one litre of water at the temperature of its maximum density (approximately 4 °C), with the density of water at that temperature very close to 1 kg/L.

=== Timeline of previous definitions ===
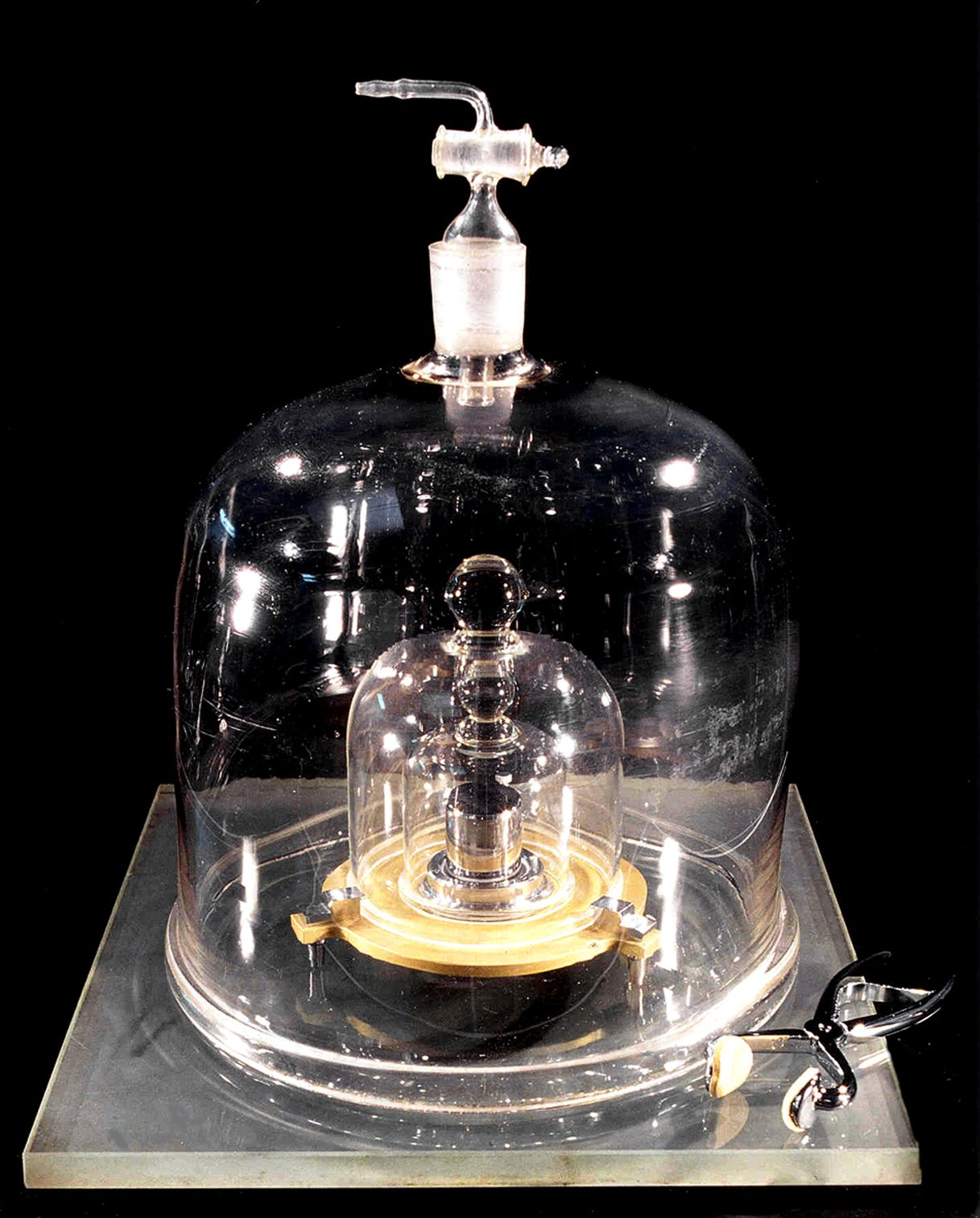
The International Prototype of the Kilogram, whose mass was defined to be one kilogram from 1889 to 2019.

- 1793: The grave (the precursor of the kilogram) was defined as the mass of 1 litre (dm^{3}) of water, which was determined to be 18841 grains.
- 1795: the gram ( 1/1000 of a kilogram) was provisionally defined as the mass of one cubic centimetre of water at the melting point of ice (0 °C).
- 1799: The Kilogramme des Archives was manufactured as a prototype. It had a mass equal to the mass of 1 dm^{3} of water at the temperature of its maximum density (approximately 4 °C).
- 1875–1889: The Metre Convention was signed in 1875, leading to the production of the International Prototype of the Kilogram (IPK) in 1879 and its adoption in 1889.
- 2019: The kilogram was defined in terms of the Planck constant, the speed of light and hyperfine transition frequency of ^{133}Cs as approved by the General Conference on Weights and Measures (CGPM) on 16 November 2018.

== Name and terminology ==
The kilogram is the only base SI unit with an SI prefix (kilo) as part of its name. The word kilogramme or kilogram is derived from the French kilogramme, which itself was a learned coinage, prefixing the Greek stem of χίλιοι khilioi "a thousand" to gramma, a Late Latin term for "a small weight", itself from Greek γράμμα. The word kilogramme was written into French law in 1795, in the Decree of 18 Germinal, which revised the provisional system of units introduced by the French National Convention two years earlier, where the gravet had been defined as weight (poids) of a cubic centimetre of water, equal to 1/1000 of a grave. In the decree of 1795, the term gramme thus replaced gravet, and kilogramme replaced grave.

The French spelling was adopted in Great Britain when the word was used for the first time in English in 1795, with the spelling kilogram being adopted in the United States. In the United Kingdom both spellings are used, with "kilogram" having become by far the more common. UK law regulating the units to be used when trading by weight or measure does not prevent the use of either spelling.

In the 19th century the French word kilo, a shortening of kilogramme, was imported into the English language where it has been used to mean both kilogram and kilometre. While kilo as an alternative is acceptable, to The Economist for example, the Canadian government's Termium Plus system states that "SI (International System of Units) usage, followed in scientific and technical writing" does not allow its usage and it is described as "a common informal name" on Russ Rowlett's Dictionary of Units of Measurement. When the United States Congress gave the metric system legal status in 1866, it permitted the use of the word kilo as an alternative to the word kilogram, but in 1990 revoked the status of the word kilo.

The SI system was introduced in 1960 and in 1970 the BIPM started publishing the SI Brochure, which contains all relevant decisions and recommendations by the CGPM concerning units. The SI Brochure states that "It is not permissible to use abbreviations for unit symbols or unit names ...". (Note: The French text (which is the authoritative text) states "Il n'est pas autorisé d'utiliser des abréviations pour les symboles et noms d'unités ...")

For use with east Asian character sets, the SI symbol is encoded as a single Unicode character, U+338F ㎏ SQUARE KG in the CJK Compatibility block.

== Redefinition based on fundamental constants ==
The SI system after the 2019 redefinition: the kilogram is now fixed in terms of the second, the speed of light and the Planck constant; furthermore the ampere no longer depends on the kilogram

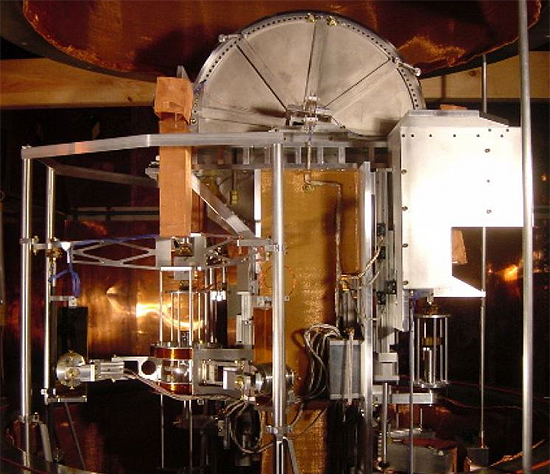
A Kibble balance, which was originally used to measure the Planck constant in terms of the IPK, can now be used to calibrate secondary standard weights for practical use.

The replacement of the International Prototype of the Kilogram (IPK) as the primary standard was motivated by evidence accumulated over a long period of time that the mass of the IPK and its replicas had been changing; the IPK had diverged from its replicas by approximately 50 micrograms since their manufacture late in the 19th century. This led to several competing efforts to develop measurement technology precise enough to warrant replacing the kilogram artefact with a definition based directly on physical fundamental constants.

The International Committee for Weights and Measures (CIPM) approved a revision in November 2018 that defines the kilogram by defining the Planck constant to be exactly 6.62607015×10^{−34} kg⋅m^{2}⋅s^{−1}, effectively defining the kilogram in terms of the second and the metre. The new definition took effect on 20 May 2019.

Prior to the redefinition, the kilogram and several other SI units based on the kilogram were defined by a man-made metal artifact: the Kilogramme des Archives from 1799 to 1889, and the IPK from 1889 to 2019.

In 1960, the metre, previously similarly having been defined with reference to a single platinum-iridium bar with two marks on it, was redefined in terms of an invariant physical constant (the wavelength of a particular emission of light emitted by krypton, and later the speed of light) so that the standard can be independently reproduced in different laboratories by following a written specification.

At the 94th Meeting of the CIPM in 2005, it was recommended that the same be done with the kilogram.

In October 2010, the CIPM voted to submit a resolution for consideration at the General Conference on Weights and Measures (CGPM), to "take note of an intention" that the kilogram be defined in terms of the Planck constant, h (which has dimensions of energy times time, thus mass × length^{2} / time) together with other physical constants. This resolution was accepted by the 24th conference of the CGPM in October 2011 and further discussed at the 25th conference in 2014. Although the Committee recognised that significant progress had been made, they concluded that the data did not yet appear sufficiently robust to adopt the revised definition, and that work should continue to enable the adoption at the 26th meeting, scheduled for 2018. Such a definition would theoretically permit any apparatus that was capable of delineating the kilogram in terms of the Planck constant to be used as long as it possessed sufficient precision, accuracy and stability. The Kibble balance is one way to do this.

As part of this project, a variety of very different technologies and approaches were considered and explored over many years. Some of these approaches were based on equipment and procedures that would enable the reproducible production of new, kilogram-mass prototypes on demand (albeit with extraordinary effort) using measurement techniques and material properties that are ultimately based on, or traceable to, physical constants. Others were based on devices that measured either the acceleration or weight of hand-tuned kilogram test masses and that expressed their magnitudes in electrical terms via special components that permit traceability to physical constants. All approaches depend on converting a weight measurement to a mass and therefore require precise measurement of the strength of gravity in laboratories (gravimetry). All approaches would have precisely fixed one or more constants of nature at a defined value.

== SI multiples ==
Because an SI unit may not have multiple prefixes (see SI prefix), prefixes are added to gram, rather than the base unit kilogram, which already has a prefix as part of its name. For instance, one-millionth of a kilogram is 1 mg (one milligram), not 1 μkg (one microkilogram).

SI multiples of gram (g)
Submultiples			Multiples		
Value	SI symbol	Name	Value	SI symbol	Name
10^{−1} g	dg	decigram	10^{1} g	dag	decagram
10^{−2} g	cg	centigram	10^{2} g	hg	hectogram
10^{−3} g	**mg**	**milligram**	10^{3} g	**kg**	**kilogram**
10^{−6} g	**μg**	**microgram**	10^{6} g	**Mg**	**megagram**
10^{−9} g	**ng**	**nanogram**	10^{9} g	**Gg**	**gigagram**
10^{−12} g	**pg**	**picogram**	10^{12} g	**Tg**	**teragram**
10^{−15} g	fg	femtogram	10^{15} g	Pg	petagram
10^{−18} g	ag	attogram	10^{18} g	Eg	exagram
10^{−21} g	zg	zeptogram	10^{21} g	Zg	zettagram
10^{−24} g	yg	yoctogram	10^{24} g	Yg	yottagram
10^{−27} g	rg	rontogram	10^{27} g	Rg	ronnagram
10^{−30} g	qg	quectogram	10^{30} g	Qg	quettagram
Common prefixed units are in bold face. (Note: Criterion: A combined total of at least five occurrences on the British National Corpus and the Corpus of Contemporary American English, including both the singular and the plural for both the -gram and the -gramme spelling.)

== Usage and practical issues with SI mass units ==
- Serious medication errors have been made by confusing milligrams and micrograms when micrograms has been abbreviated. The abbreviation "mcg" rather than the SI symbol "μg" is formally mandated for medical practitioners in the US by the Joint Commission on Accreditation of Healthcare Organizations (JCAHO). In the United Kingdom, the National Institute for Health and Care Excellence and Scottish Palliative Care Guidelines state that "micrograms" and "nanograms" must both be written in full, and never abbreviated as "mcg", "μg" or "ng" respectively.
- The hectogram (100 g) (Italian: ettogrammo or etto) is a very commonly used unit in the retail food trade in Italy.
- The former standard spelling and abbreviation "deka-" and "dk" produced abbreviations such as "dkm" (dekametre) and "dkg" (dekagram). As of 2020, the abbreviation "dkg" (10 g) is still used in parts of central Europe in retail for some foods such as cheese and meat.
- The unit name megagram is rarely used, and even then typically only in technical fields in contexts where especially rigorous consistency with the SI standard is desired. For most purposes, the name tonne is instead used. The tonne and its symbol, "t", were adopted by the CIPM in 1879, but it is no longer a unit accepted for use with SI.

== See also ==
- Inertia – Fundamental principle of classical physics
- Kibble balance – Electromechanical weight measuring instrument
- Kilogram-force – Weight on earth of a one-kilogram mass
- Mass versus weight – Difference between mass and weight
- Metric system – Decimal-based systems of measurement
- National Institute of Standards and Technology – Measurement standards laboratory in the United States (NIST)
- Newton – Unit of force in physics
- Specific quantity – Quotient of a quantity by mass
- Standard gravity – Standard gravitational acceleration on Earth
- Weight – Force on a mass due to gravity
