= Duella =

Ancient Roman unit of weight

A duella was an ancient Roman unit of weight, equivalent to a third of a Roman ounce (9.056 grams).
