= Mass versus weight =

Difference between mass and weight

Mass and weight of a given object on Earth and Mars. Weight varies due to different amount of gravitational acceleration whereas mass stays the same.

In common usage, the mass of an object is often referred to as its weight, though these are in fact different concepts and quantities. Nevertheless, one object will always weigh more than another with less mass if both are subject to the same gravity (i.e. the same gravitational field strength).

In scientific contexts, mass is the amount of "matter" in an object (though "matter" may be difficult to define), but weight is the force exerted on an object's matter by gravity. At the Earth's surface, an object whose mass is exactly one kilogram weighs approximately 9.81 newtons, the product of its mass and the gravitational field strength there. The object's weight is less on Mars, where gravity is weaker; more on Saturn, where gravity is stronger; and very small in space, far from significant sources of gravity, but it always has the same mass.

Material objects at the surface of the Earth have weight despite such sometimes being difficult to measure. An object floating freely on water, for example, does not appear to have weight since it is buoyed by the water. But its weight can be measured if it is added to water in a container which is entirely supported by and weighed on a scale. Thus, the "weightless object" floating in water actually transfers its weight to the bottom of the container (where the pressure increases). Similarly, a balloon has mass but may appear to have no weight or even negative weight, due to buoyancy in air. However the weight of the balloon and the gas inside it has merely been transferred to a large area of the Earth's surface, making the weight difficult to measure. The weight of a flying airplane is similarly distributed to the ground, but does not disappear. If the airplane is in level flight, the same weight-force is distributed to the surface of the Earth as when the plane was on the runway, but spread over a larger area.

A better scientific definition of mass is its description as being a measure of inertia, which is the tendency of an object to not change its current state of motion (to remain at constant velocity) unless acted on by an external unbalanced force. Gravitational "weight" is the force created when a mass is acted upon by a gravitational field and the object is not allowed to free-fall, but is supported or retarded by a mechanical force, such as the surface of a planet. Such a force constitutes weight. This force can be added to by any other kind of force.

While the weight of an object varies in proportion to the strength of the gravitational field, its mass is constant, as long as no energy or matter is added to the object. For example, although a satellite in orbit (essentially a free-fall) is "weightless", it still retains its mass and inertia. Accordingly, even in orbit, an astronaut trying to accelerate the satellite in any direction is still required to exert force, and needs to exert ten times as much force to accelerate a 10‑ton satellite at the same rate as one with a mass of only 1 ton.

== Overview ==
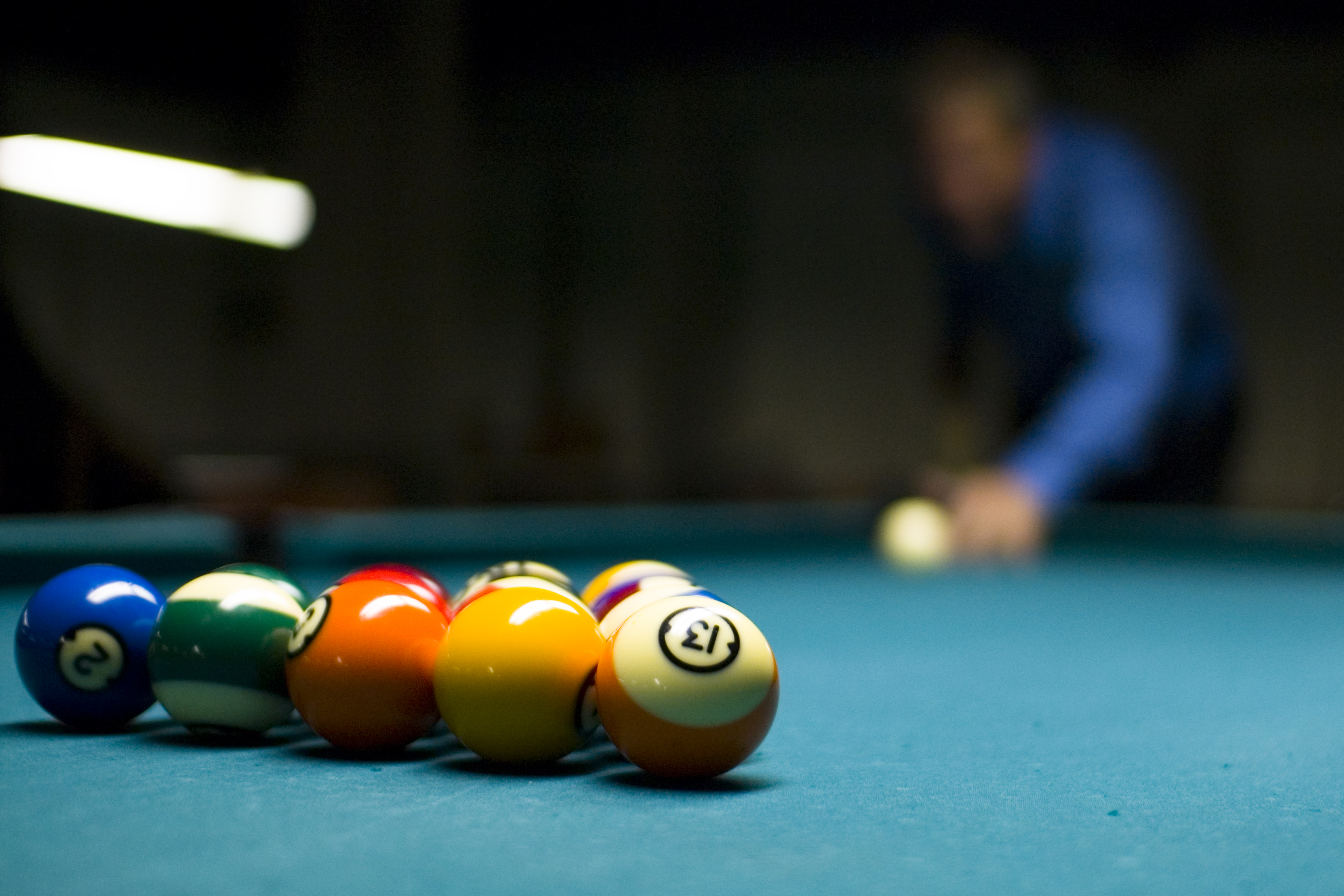
Matter's mass strongly influences many familiar kinetic properties, such as the motion of billiard balls.

Mass is (among other properties) an inertial property; that is, the tendency of an object to remain at constant velocity unless acted upon by an outside force. Under Sir Isaac Newton's 339-year-old laws of motion and an important formula that sprang from his work, F = ma, an object with a mass, m, of one kilogram accelerates, a, at one meter per second per second (about one-tenth the acceleration due to Earth's gravity) when acted upon by a force, F, of one newton.

Inertia is seen when a bowling ball is pushed horizontally on a level, smooth surface, and continues in horizontal motion. This is quite distinct from its weight, which is the downwards gravitational force of the bowling ball one must counter when holding it off the floor. The weight of the bowling ball on the Moon would be one-sixth of that on the Earth, although its mass remains unchanged. Consequently, whenever the physics of recoil kinetics (mass, velocity, inertia, inelastic and elastic collisions) dominate and the influence of gravity is a negligible factor, the behavior of objects remains consistent even where gravity is relatively weak. For instance, billiard balls on a billiard table would scatter and recoil with the same speeds and energies after a break shot on the Moon as on Earth; they would, however, drop into the pockets much more slowly.

In the physical sciences, the terms "mass" and "weight" are rigidly defined as separate measures, as they are different physical properties. In everyday use, as all everyday objects have both mass and weight and one is almost exactly proportional to the other, "weight" often serves to describe both properties, its meaning being dependent upon context. For example, in retail commerce, the "net weight" of products actually refers to mass, and is expressed in mass units such as grams or ounces (see also Pound: Use in commerce). Conversely, the load index rating on automobile tires, which specifies the maximum structural load for a tire in kilograms, refers to weight; that is, the force due to gravity. Before the late 20th century, the distinction between the two was not strictly applied in technical writing, so that expressions such as "molecular weight" (for molecular mass) are still seen.

Because mass and weight are separate quantities, they have different units of measure. In the International System of Units (SI), the kilogram is the basic unit of mass, and the newton is the basic unit of force. The non-SI kilogram-force is also a unit of force typically used in the measure of weight. Similarly, the avoirdupois pound, used in both the Imperial system and U.S. customary units, is a unit of mass, and its related unit of force is the pound-force.

== Converting units of mass to equivalent forces on Earth ==
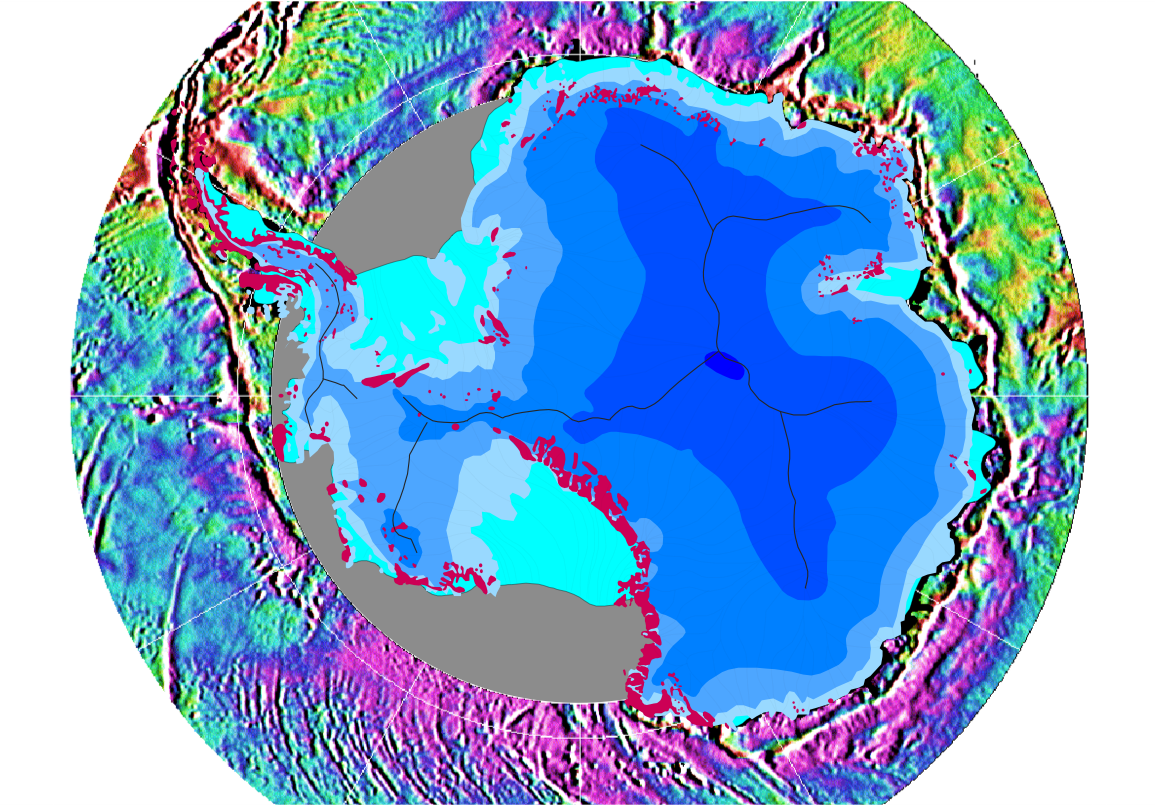
Gravity anomalies covering the Southern Ocean are shown here in false-color relief. This image has been normalized to remove variation due to differences in latitude.

When an object's weight (its gravitational force) is expressed in "kilograms", this actually refers to the kilogram-force (kgf or kg-f), also known as the kilopond (kp), which is a non-SI unit of force. All objects on the Earth's surface are subject to a gravitational acceleration of approximately 9.8 m/s^{2}. The General Conference on Weights and Measures fixed the value of standard gravity at precisely 9.80665 m/s^{2} so that disciplines such as metrology would have a standard value for converting units of defined mass into defined forces and pressures. Thus the kilogram-force is defined as precisely 9.80665 newtons. In reality, gravitational acceleration (symbol: g) varies slightly with latitude, elevation and subsurface density; these variations are typically only a few tenths of a percent. See also Gravimetry.

Engineers and scientists understand the distinctions between mass, force, and weight. Engineers in disciplines involving weight loading (force on a structure due to gravity), such as structural engineering, convert the mass of objects like concrete and automobiles (expressed in kilograms) to a force in newtons (by multiplying by some factor around 9.8; 2 significant figures is usually sufficient for such calculations) to derive the load of the object. Material properties like elastic modulus are measured and published in terms of the newton and pascal (a unit of pressure related to the newton).

== Buoyancy and weight ==
Regardless of the fluid in which an object is immersed (gas or liquid), the buoyant force on an object is equal to the weight of the fluid it displaces.

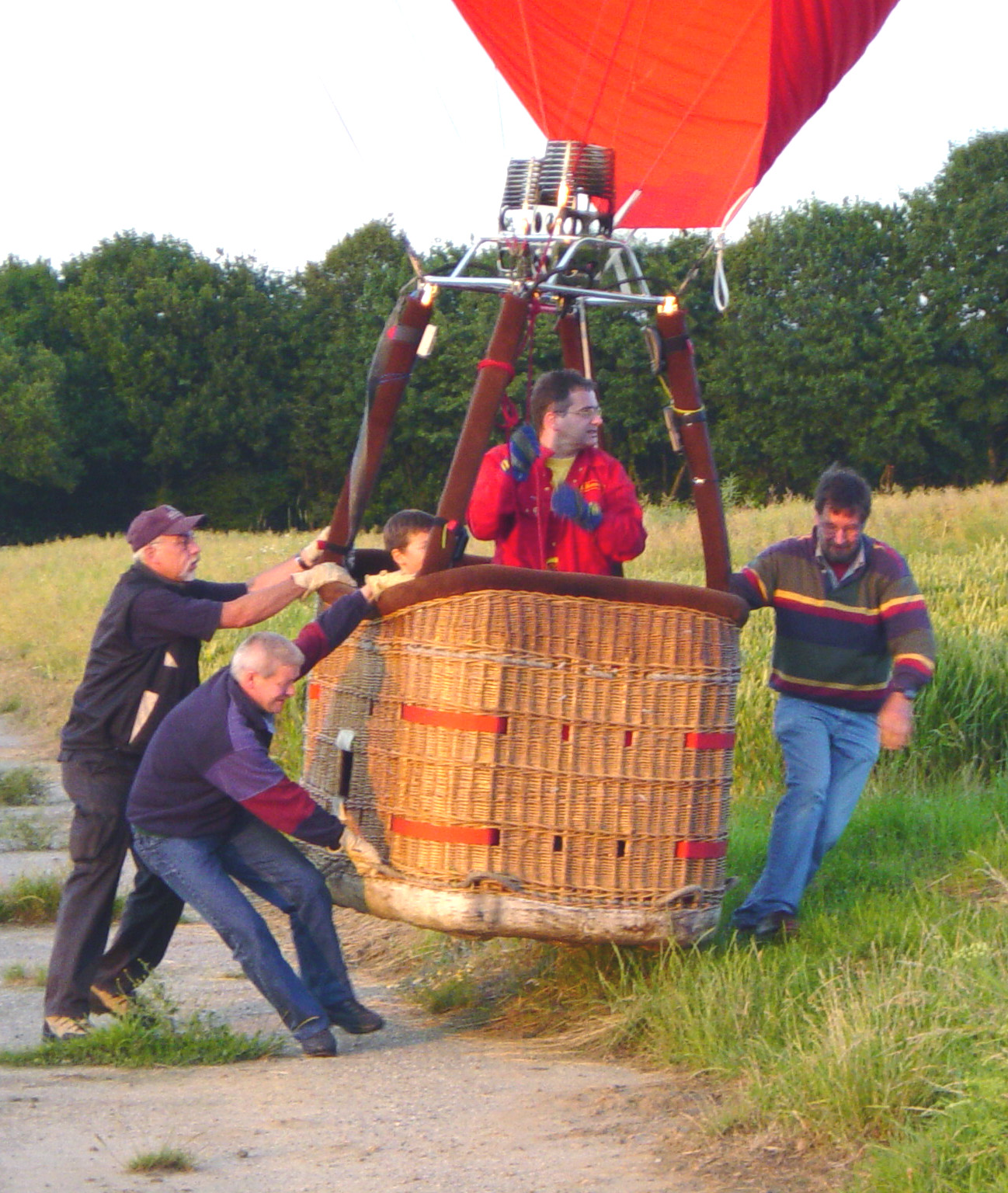
A hot air balloon when it has neutral buoyancy has no weight for the men to support but still retains great inertia due to its mass.

Usually, the relationship between mass and weight on Earth is highly proportional; objects that are a hundred times more massive than a one-liter bottle of soda almost always weigh a hundred times more—approximately 1,000 newtons, which is the weight one would expect on Earth from an object with a mass slightly greater than 100 kilograms. Yet, this is not always the case and there are familiar objects that violate this mass / weight proportionality.

A common helium-filled toy balloon is something familiar to many. When such a balloon is fully filled with helium, it has buoyancy—a force that opposes gravity. When a toy balloon becomes partially deflated, it often becomes neutrally buoyant and can float about the house a meter or two off the floor. In such a state, there are moments when the balloon is neither rising nor falling and—in the sense that a scale placed under it has no force applied to it—is, in a sense perfectly weightless (actually as noted below, weight has merely been redistributed along the Earth's surface so it cannot be measured). Though the rubber comprising the balloon has a mass of only a few grams, which might be almost unnoticeable, the rubber still retains all its mass when inflated.

Again, unlike the effect that low-gravity environments have on weight, buoyancy does not make a portion of an object's weight vanish; the missing weight is instead being borne by the ground, which leaves less force (weight) being applied to any scale theoretically placed underneath the object in question (though one may perhaps have some trouble with the practical aspects of accurately weighing something individually in that condition). If one were however to weigh a small wading pool that someone then entered and began floating in, they would find that the full weight of the person was being borne by the pool and, ultimately, the scale underneath the pool. Whereas a buoyant object (on a properly working scale for weighing buoyant objects) would weigh less, the object/fluid system becomes heavier by the value of object's full mass once the object is added. Since air is a fluid, this principle applies to object/air systems as well; large volumes of air—and ultimately the ground—supports the weight a body loses through mid-air buoyancy.

The effects of buoyancy do not just affect balloons; both liquids and gases are fluids in the physical sciences, and when all macro‑size objects larger than dust particles are immersed in fluids on Earth, they have some degree of buoyancy. In the case of either a swimmer floating in a pool or a balloon floating in air, buoyancy can fully counter the gravitational weight of the object being weighed, for a weighing device in the pool. However, as noted, an object supported by a fluid is fundamentally no different from an object supported by a sling or cable—the weight has merely been transferred to another location, not made to disappear.

The mass of "weightless" (neutrally buoyant) balloons can be better appreciated with much larger hot air balloons. Although no effort is required to counter their weight when they are hovering over the ground (when they can often be within one hundred newtons of zero weight), the inertia associated with their appreciable mass of several hundred kilograms or more can knock fully grown men off their feet when the balloon's basket is moving horizontally over the ground.

Buoyancy and the resultant reduction in the downward force of objects being weighed underlies Archimedes' principle, which states that the buoyancy force is equal to the weight of the fluid that the object displaces. If this fluid is air, the force may be small.

== Buoyancy effects of air on measurement ==
Normally, the effect of air buoyancy on objects of normal density is too small to be of any consequence in day-to-day activities. For instance, buoyancy's diminishing effect upon one's body weight (a relatively low-density object) is 1/860 that of gravity (for pure water it is about 1/770 that of gravity). Furthermore, variations in barometric pressure rarely affect a person's weight more than ±1 part in 30,000. However, in metrology (the science of measurement), the precision mass standards for calibrating laboratory scales and balances are manufactured with such accuracy that air density is accounted for to compensate for buoyancy effects. Given the extremely high cost of platinum-iridium mass standards like the international prototype of the kilogram (the mass standard in France that defined the magnitude of the kilogram), high-quality "working" standards are made of special stainless steel alloys with densities of about 8,000 kg/m^{3}, which occupy greater volume than those made of platinum-iridium, which have a density of about 21,550 kg/m^{3}. For convenience, a standard value of buoyancy relative to stainless steel was developed for metrology work and this results in the term "conventional mass". Conventional mass is defined as follows: "For a mass at 20 °C, 'conventional mass' is the mass of a reference standard of density 8,000 kg/m^{3} which it balances in air with a density of 1.2 kg/m^{3}." The effect is a small one, 150 ppm for stainless steel mass standards, but the appropriate corrections are made during the manufacture of all precision mass standards so they have the true labeled mass.

Whenever a high-precision scale (or balance) in routine laboratory use is calibrated using stainless steel standards, the scale is actually being calibrated to conventional mass; that is, true mass minus 150 ppm of buoyancy. Since objects with precisely the same mass but with different densities displace different volumes and therefore have different buoyancies and weights, any object measured on this scale (compared to a stainless steel mass standard) has its conventional mass measured; that is, its true mass minus an unknown degree of buoyancy. In high-accuracy work, the volume of the article can be measured to mathematically null the effect of buoyancy.

== Types of scales and what they measure ==
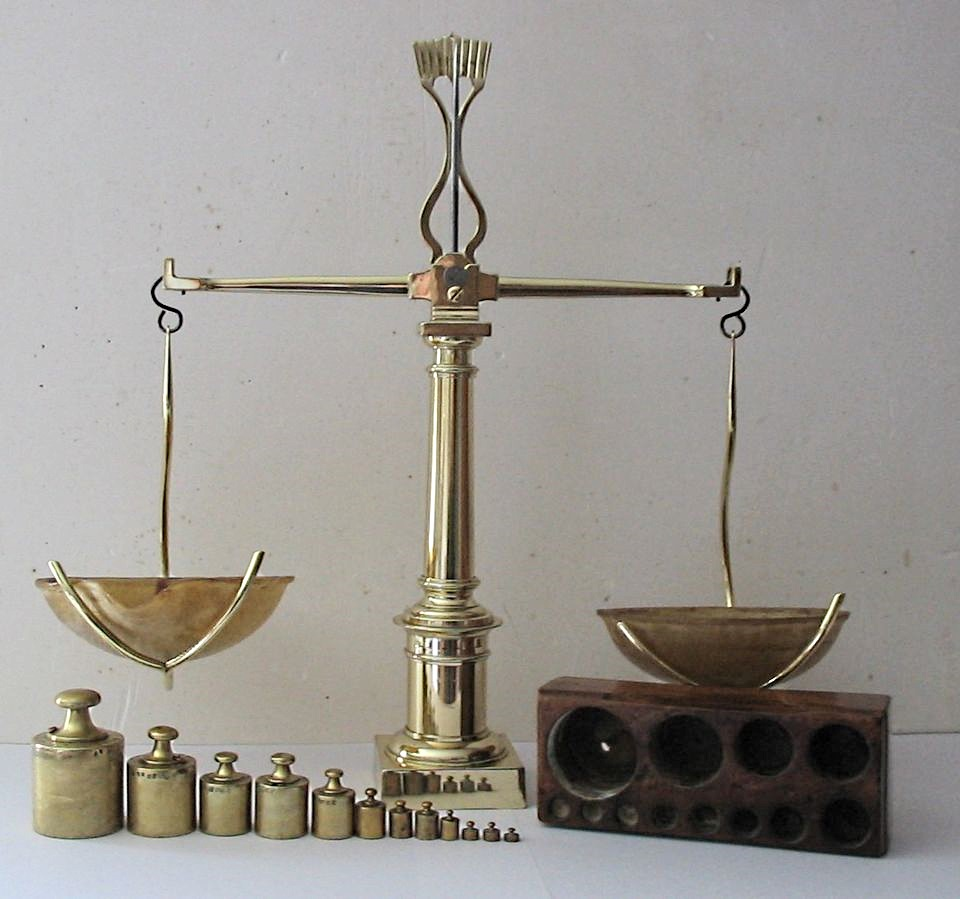
A balance-type weighing scale: Unaffected by the strength of gravity.

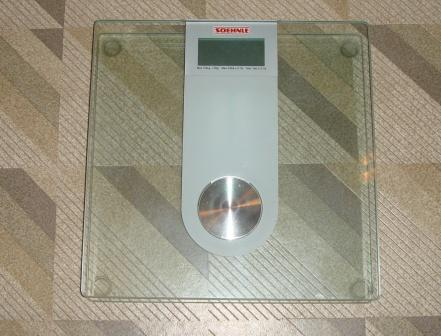
Load-cell based bathroom scale: Affected by the strength of gravity.

When one stands on a balance-beam-type scale at a doctor's office, they are having their mass measured directly. This is because balances ("dual-pan" mass comparators) compare the gravitational force exerted on the person on the platform with that on the sliding counterweights on the beams; gravity is the force-generating mechanism that allows the needle to diverge from the "balanced" (null) point. These balances could be moved from Earth's equator to the poles and give exactly the same measurement, i.e. they would not spuriously indicate that the doctor's patient became 0.3% heavier; they are immune to the gravity-countering centrifugal force due to Earth's rotation about its axis. But if one steps onto spring-based or digital load cell-based scales (single-pan devices), one is having one's weight (gravitational force) measured; and variations in the strength of the gravitational field affect the reading. In practice, when such scales are used in commerce or hospitals, they are often adjusted on-site and certified on that basis, so that the mass they measure, expressed in pounds or kilograms, is at the desired level of accuracy.

== Use in United States commerce ==
In the United States of America the United States Department of Commerce, the Technology Administration, and the National Institute of Standards and Technology (NIST) have defined the use of mass and weight in the exchange of goods under the Uniform Laws and Regulations in the areas of legal metrology and engine fuel quality in NIST Handbook 130:

K. "Mass" and "Weight" [See Section K. NOTE]

The mass of an object is a measure of the object's inertial property, or the amount of matter it contains. The weight of an object is a measure of the force exerted on the object by gravity, or the force needed to support it. The pull of gravity on the earth gives an object a downward acceleration of about 9.8 m/s^{2}. In trade and commerce and everyday use, the term "weight" is often used as a synonym for "mass". The "net mass" or "net weight" declared on a label indicates that the package contains a specific amount of commodity exclusive of wrapping materials. The use of the term "mass" is predominant throughout the world, and is becoming increasingly common in the United States.
(Added 1993)

Section K. NOTE: When used in this law (or regulation), the term "weight" means "mass". (see paragraphs K. "Mass" and "Weight" and L. Use of the Terms "Mass" and "Weight" in Section I. Introduction of NIST Handbook 130 for an explanation of these terms.)
(Note Added 1993)

L. Use of the Terms "Mass" and "Weight" [See Section K. NOTE]

When used in this handbook, the term "weight" means "mass". The term "weight" appears when inch-pound units are cited, or when both inch-pound and SI units are included in a requirement. The terms "mass" or "masses" are used when only SI units are cited in a requirement. The following note appears where the term "weight" is first used in a law or regulation.

U.S. federal law, which supersedes this handbook, also defines weight, particularly Net Weight, in terms of the avoirdupois pound or mass pound. From 21 CFR § 101.105 – Declaration of net quantity of contents when exempt:

(a) The principal display panel of a food in package form shall bear a declaration of the net quantity of contents. This shall be expressed in the terms of weight, measure, numerical count, or a combination of numerical count and weight or measure. The statement shall be in terms of fluid measure if the food is liquid, or in terms of weight if the food is solid, semisolid, or viscous, or a mixture of solid and liquid; except that such statement may be in terms of dry measure if the food is a fresh fruit, fresh vegetable, or other dry commodity that is customarily sold by dry measure. If there is a firmly established general consumer usage and trade custom of declaring the contents of a liquid by weight, or a solid, semisolid, or viscous product by fluid measure, it may be used. Whenever the Commissioner determines that an existing practice of declaring net quantity of contents by weight, measure, numerical count, or a combination in the case of a specific packaged food does not facilitate value comparisons by consumers and offers opportunity for consumer confusion, he will by regulation designate the appropriate term or terms to be used for such commodity.

(b)(1) Statements of weight shall be in terms of avoirdupois pound and ounce.

See also 21 CFR § 201.51 – Declaration of net quantity of contents for general labeling and prescription labeling requirements.

== See also ==
- Apparent weight
- Gravimeter
- Pound (force)
