= 2019 revision of the SI =

Definition of the units kg, A, K and mol

The SI system after the 2019 definition: Base units as defined in terms of physical constants and other base units. Here, $a \rightarrow b$ means $a$ is used in the definition of $b$.

The SI system after 1983, but before the 2019 redefinition: Base unit definitions in terms of other base units (for example, the metre is defined as the distance travelled by light in a specific fraction of a second), with the constants of nature and artefacts used to define them (such as the mass of the IPK for the kilogram, and the triple point of water for the kelvin).

In 2019, four of the seven SI base units specified in the International System of Quantities were redefined in terms of natural physical constants, rather than human artefacts such as the International Prototype of the Kilogram. Effective 20 May 2019, the 144th anniversary of the Metre Convention, the kilogram, ampere, kelvin, and mole are defined by setting exact numerical values, when expressed in SI units, for the Planck constant (h), the elementary electric charge (e), the Boltzmann constant (k_{B}), and the Avogadro constant (N_{A}), respectively. The second, metre, and candela had previously been redefined using physical constants. The four new definitions aimed to improve the SI without changing the value of any units, ensuring continuity with existing measurements. In November 2018, the 26th General Conference on Weights and Measures (CGPM) unanimously approved these changes, which the International Committee for Weights and Measures (CIPM) had proposed earlier that year after determining that previously agreed conditions for the change had been met. These conditions were satisfied by a series of experiments that measured the constants to high accuracy relative to the old SI definitions, and were the culmination of decades of research.

The previous major change of the metric system occurred in 1960 when the International System of Units (SI) was formally published. At this time the metre was redefined: the definition was changed from the prototype of the metre to a certain number of wavelengths of a spectral line of a krypton-86 radiation, making it derivable from universal natural phenomena. (Note: The metre was redefined again in 1983 by fixing the value of the speed of light in vacuum. That definition went unaltered in 2019 and remains in effect today.) The kilogram remained defined by a physical prototype, leaving it the only artefact upon which the SI unit definitions depended. At this time the SI, as a coherent system, was constructed around seven base units, powers of which were used to construct all other units. With the 2019 redefinition, the SI is constructed around seven defining constants, allowing all units to be constructed directly from these constants. The designation of base units is retained but is no longer essential to define the SI units.

The metric system was originally conceived as a system of measurement that was derivable from unchanging phenomena, but practical limitations necessitated the use of artefacts – the prototype of the metre and prototype of the kilogram – when the metric system was introduced in France in 1799. Although they were designed for long-term stability, the prototype kilogram and its secondary copies have shown small variations in mass relative to each other over time; they are not thought to be adequate for the increasing accuracy demanded by science, prompting a search for a suitable replacement. The definitions of some units were defined by measurements that are difficult to precisely realise in a laboratory, such as the kelvin, which was defined in terms of the triple point of water. With the 2019 redefinition, the SI became wholly derivable from natural phenomena with most units being based on fundamental physical constants.

A number of authors have published criticisms of the revised definitions; their criticisms include the premise that the proposal failed to address the impact of breaking the link between the definition of the dalton (Note: The dalton is not defined in the formal proposal to be voted upon by the CGPM, only in the 9th edition of the SI Brochure.) and the definitions of the kilogram, the mole, and the Avogadro constant.

== Background ==
The basic structure of the SI was developed over about 170 years between 1791 and 1960. Since 1960, technological advances have made it possible to address weaknesses in the SI such as the dependence on a physical artefact to define the kilogram.

=== Development of SI ===
During the early years of the French Revolution, the leaders of the French National Constituent Assembly decided to introduce a new system of measurement that was based on the principles of logic and natural phenomena. The metre was defined as one ten-millionth of the distance from the north pole to the equator and the kilogram as the mass of one thousandth of a cubic metre of pure water. Although these definitions were chosen to avoid ownership of the units, they could not be measured with sufficient convenience or precision to be of practical use. Instead, realisations were created in the form of the mètre des Archives and kilogramme des Archives, which were a "best attempt" at fulfilling these principles.

By 1875, use of the metric system had become widespread in Europe and in Latin America; that year, twenty industrially developed nations met for the Convention of the Metre, which led to the signing of the Treaty of the Metre, under which three bodies were set up to take custody of the international prototypes of the kilogram and the metre, and to regulate comparisons with national prototypes. They were:

- CGPM (General Conference on Weights and Measures, Conférence générale des poids et mesures) – The Conference meets every four to six years and consists of delegates of the nations that had signed the convention. It discusses and examines the arrangements required to ensure the propagation and improvement of the International System of Units and it endorses the results of new fundamental metrological determinations.
- CIPM (International Committee for Weights and Measures, Comité international des poids et mesures) – The Committee consists of eighteen eminent scientists, each from a different country, nominated by the CGPM. The CIPM meets annually and is tasked with advising the CGPM. The CIPM has set up a number of sub-committees, each charged with a particular area of interest. One of these, the Consultative Committee for Units (CCU), advises the CIPM on matters concerning units of measurement.
- BIPM (International Bureau for Weights and Measures, Bureau international des poids et mesures) – The Bureau provides safe keeping of the international prototypes of the kilogram and the metre, provides laboratory facilities for regular comparisons of the national prototypes with the international prototype, and is the secretariat for the CIPM and the CGPM.

The 1st CGPM (1889) formally approved the use of 40 prototype metres and 40 prototype kilograms made by the British firm Johnson Matthey as the standards mandated by the Convention of the Metre. The prototypes Metre No. 6 and Kilogram KIII were designated as the international prototype of the metre and the kilogram, respectively; the CGPM retained other copies as working copies, and the rest were distributed to member states for use as their national prototypes. About once every 40 years, the national prototypes were compared with and recalibrated against the international prototype.

In 1921 the Convention of the Metre was revised and the mandate of the CGPM was extended to provide standards for all units of measure, not just mass and length. In the ensuing years, the CGPM took on responsibility for providing standards of electrical current (1946), luminosity (1946), temperature (1948), time (1956), and molar mass (1971). The 9th CGPM in 1948 instructed the CIPM "to make recommendations for a single practical system of units of measurement, suitable for adoption by all countries adhering to the Metre Convention". The recommendations based on this mandate were presented to the 11th CGPM (1960), where they were formally accepted and given the name "Système International d'Unités" and its abbreviation "SI".

=== Impetus for change ===
There is a precedent for changing the underlying principles behind the definition of the SI base units; the 11th CGPM (1960) defined the SI metre in terms of the wavelength of krypton-86 radiation, replacing the pre-SI metre bar, and the 13th CGPM (1967) replaced the original definition of the second, which was based on Earth's average rotation from 1750 to 1892, with a definition based on the frequency of the radiation emitted or absorbed with a transition between two hyperfine levels of the ground state of the caesium-133 atom. The 17th CGPM (1983) replaced the 1960 definition of the metre with one based on the second by giving an exact definition of the speed of light in units of metres per second.

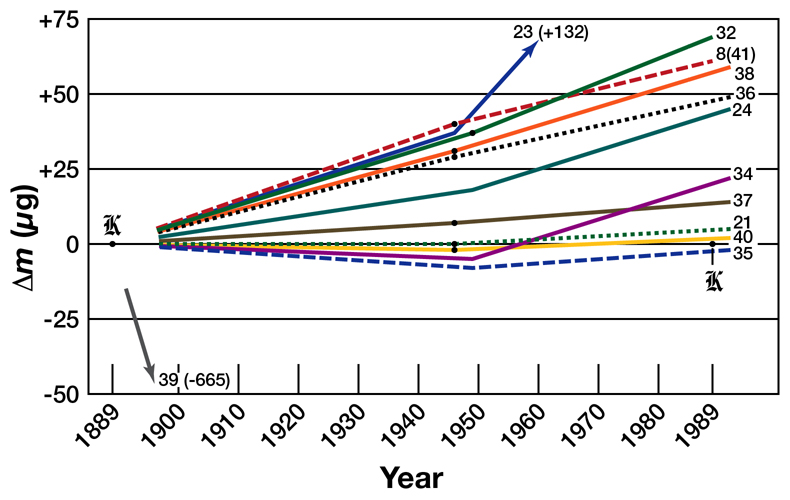
Mass drift over time of national prototypes K21–K40, plus two of the international prototype's sister copies: K32 and K8(41). (Note: Prototype No. 8(41) was accidentally stamped with the number 41, but its accessories carry the proper number 8. Since there is no prototype marked 8, this prototype is referred to as 8(41).) All mass changes are relative to the IPK.

Since their manufacture, drifts of up to 2×10^{−8} kilograms (20 μg) per year in the national prototype kilograms relative to the international prototype of the kilogram (IPK) have been detected. There was no way of determining whether the national prototypes were gaining mass or whether the IPK was losing mass. Newcastle University metrologist Peter Cumpson has since identified mercury vapour absorption or carbonaceous contamination as possible causes of this drift. At the 21st meeting of the CGPM (1999), national laboratories were urged to investigate ways of breaking the link between the kilogram and a specific artefact.

Metrologists investigated several alternative approaches to redefining the kilogram based on fundamental physical constants. Among others, the Avogadro project and the development of the Kibble balance (known as the "watt balance" before 2016) promised methods of indirectly measuring mass with very high precision. These projects provided tools that enable alternative means of redefining the kilogram.

A report published in 2007 by the Consultative Committee for Thermometry (CCT) to the CIPM noted that their current definition of temperature has proved to be unsatisfactory for temperatures below 20 K and for temperatures above 1300 K. The committee took the view that the Boltzmann constant provided a better basis for temperature measurement than did the triple point of water because it overcame these difficulties.

At its 23rd meeting (2007), the CGPM mandated the CIPM to investigate the use of natural constants as the basis for all units of measure rather than the artefacts that were then in use. The following year this was endorsed by the International Union of Pure and Applied Physics (IUPAP). At a meeting of the CCU held in Reading, United Kingdom, in September 2010, a resolution and draft changes to the SI brochure that were to be presented to the next meeting of the CIPM in October 2010 were agreed to in principle. The CIPM meeting of October 2010 found "the conditions set by the General Conference at its 23rd meeting have not yet been fully met. (Note: In particular the CIPM was to prepare a detailed mise en pratique for each of the new definitions of the kilogram, ampere, kelvin and mole set by the 23rd CGPM.) For this reason the CIPM does not propose a revision of the SI at the present time". The CIPM, however, presented a resolution for consideration at the 24th CGPM (17–21 October 2011) to agree to the new definitions in principle, but not to implement them until the details had been finalised. This resolution was accepted by the conference, and in addition the CGPM moved the date of the 25th meeting forward from 2015 to 2014. At the 25th meeting on 18 to 20 November 2014, it was found that "despite [progress in the necessary requirements] the data do not yet appear to be sufficiently robust for the CGPM to adopt the revised SI at its 25th meeting", thus postponing the revision to the next meeting in 2018. Measurements accurate enough to meet the conditions were available in 2017 and the redefinition was adopted at the 26th CGPM (13–16 November 2018).

== Defining constants ==
Following the successful 1983 redefinition of the metre in terms of an exact numerical value for the speed of light, the BIPM's Consultative Committee for Units (CCU) recommended and the BIPM proposed that four further constants of nature should be defined to have exact values. These are: (Note: These constants are described in the 2006 version of the SI manual but in that version, the latter three are defined as "constants to be obtained by experiment" rather than as "defining constants".)

- The Planck constant h is exactly 6.62607015×10^{−34} joule-second (J⋅s).
- The elementary charge e is exactly 1.602176634×10^{−19} coulomb (C).
- The Boltzmann constant k is exactly 1.380649×10^{−23} joule per kelvin (J⋅K^{−1}).
- The Avogadro constant N_{A} is exactly 6.02214076×10^{23} reciprocal mole (mol^{−1}).

The redefinition retains unchanged the numerical values associated with the following constants of nature:

- The speed of light c is exactly 299792458 metres per second (m⋅s^{−1});
- The ground state hyperfine structure transition frequency of the caesium-133 atom Δν_{Cs} is exactly 9192631770 hertz (Hz);
- The luminous efficacy of monochromatic radiation of frequency 5.40×10^{14} Hz (540 THz) – a frequency of green-colored light at approximately the peak sensitivity of the human eye – K_{cd} (where the subscript "cd" is the symbol for candela) is exactly 683 lumens per watt (lm⋅W^{−1}).

The seven SI defining constants above, expressed in terms of derived units (joule, coulomb, hertz, lumen, and watt), are rewritten below in terms of the seven base units (second, metre, kilogram, ampere, kelvin, mole, and candela); the dimensionless unit steradian (symbol sr) is also used:

- h = 6.62607015×10^{−34} kg⋅m^{2}⋅s^{−1}
- e = 1.602176634×10^{−19} A⋅s
- k = 1.380649×10^{−23} kg⋅m^{2}⋅K^{−1}⋅s^{−2}
- N_{A} = 6.02214076×10^{23} mol^{−1}
- c = 299792458 m⋅s^{−1}
- Δν_{Cs} = Δν(^{133}Cs)_{hfs} = 9192631770 s^{−1}
- K_{cd} = 683 cd⋅sr⋅s^{3}⋅kg^{−1}⋅m^{−2}

As part of the redefinition, the International Prototype of the Kilogram was retired and definitions of the kilogram, the ampere, and the kelvin were replaced. The definition of the mole was revised. These changes have the effect of redefining the SI base units, though the definitions of the SI derived units in terms of the base units remain the same.

== Impact on base unit definitions ==
Following the CCU proposal, the texts of the definitions of all of the base units were either refined or rewritten, changing the emphasis from explicit-unit-type to explicit-constant-type definitions. Explicit-unit definitions define a unit in terms of a specific example of that unit; for example, in 1324 Edward II defined the inch as being the length of three barleycorns, and from 1889 to 2019 the kilogram was defined as the mass of the International Prototype of the kilogram. In explicit-constant definitions, a constant of nature is given a specified value, and the definition of the unit emerges as a consequence; for example, in 2019, the speed of light was defined as exactly 299792458 metres per second. The length of the metre could be derived because the second had been already independently defined. The previous and 2019 definitions are given below.

=== Second ===
The new definition of the second is effectively the same as the previous one, the only difference being that the conditions under which the definition applies are more rigorously defined.

- Previous definition: The second is the duration of 9192631770 periods of the radiation corresponding to the transition between the two hyperfine levels of the ground state of the caesium-133 atom.
- 2019 definition: The second, symbol s, is the SI unit of time. It is defined by taking the fixed numerical value of the caesium frequency, Δν_{Cs}, the unperturbed ground-state hyperfine transition frequency of the caesium-133 atom, (Note: Although the phrase used here is more terse than in the previous definition, it still has the same meaning. This is made clear in the 9th SI Brochure, which almost immediately after the definition on p. 130 states: "The effect of this definition is that the second is equal to the duration of 9192631770 periods of the radiation corresponding to the transition between the two hyperfine levels of the unperturbed ground state of the ^{133}Cs atom.") to be 9192631770 when expressed in the unit Hz, which is equal to s^{−1}.

The second may be expressed directly in terms of the defining constants:

1 s = 9192631770/Δν_{Cs}.

=== Metre ===
The new definition of the metre is effectively the same as the previous one, the only difference being that the additional rigour in the definition of the second propagated to the metre.

- Previous definition: The metre is the length of the path travelled by light in vacuum during a time interval of 1/299792458 of a second.
- 2019 definition: The metre, symbol m, is the SI unit of length. It is defined by taking the fixed numerical value of the speed of light in vacuum c to be 299792458 when expressed in the unit m⋅s^{−1}, where the second is defined in terms of the caesium frequency Δν_{Cs}.

The metre may be expressed directly in terms of the defining constants:

1 m = 9192631770/299792458 c/Δν_{Cs}.

=== Kilogram ===
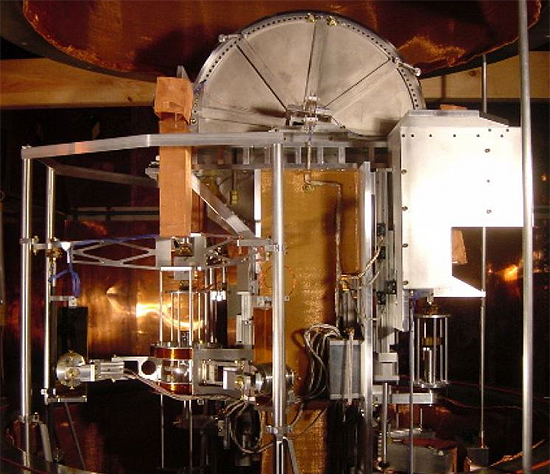
A Kibble balance, which was used to measure the Planck constant in terms of the international prototype of the kilogram.

The definition of the kilogram fundamentally changed from an artefact (the International Prototype of the Kilogram) to a constant of nature. Because the Planck constant relates photon energy to photon frequency, the new definition relates the kilogram to the mass equivalent of the energy of a photon at a specific frequency.

- Previous definition: The kilogram is the unit of mass; it is equal to the mass of the international prototype of the kilogram.
- 2019 definition: The kilogram, symbol kg, is the SI unit of mass. It is defined by taking the fixed numerical value of the Planck constant h to be 6.62607015×10^{−34} when expressed in the unit J⋅s, which is equal to kg⋅m^{2}⋅s^{−1}, where the metre and the second are defined in terms of c and Δν_{Cs}.

For illustration, an earlier proposed redefinition that is equivalent to this 2019 definition is: "The kilogram is the mass of a body at rest whose equivalent energy equals the energy of a collection of photons whose frequencies sum to [1.356392489652×10^{50}] hertz."

The kilogram may be expressed directly in terms of the defining constants:

1 kg = (299792458)^{2}/((6.62607015×10^{−34})(9192631770))hΔν_{Cs}/c^{2}.

Leading to

1 J⋅s = h/(6.62607015×10^{−34})
1 J = hΔν_{Cs}/((6.62607015×10^{−34})(9192631770))
1 W = h(Δν_{Cs})^{2}/((6.62607015×10^{−34})(9192631770)^{2})
1 N = 299792458/((6.62607015×10^{−34})(9192631770)^{2})h(Δν_{Cs})^{2}/c

=== Ampere ===
The definition of the ampere underwent a major revision. The previous definition relied on infinite lengths that are impossible to realise:

- Previous definition: The ampere is that constant current that, if maintained in two straight parallel conductors of infinite length, of negligible circular cross-section, and placed 1 m apart in vacuum, would produce between these conductors a force equal to 2×10^{−7} newton per metre of length.

The alternative avoided that issue:

- 2019 definition: The ampere, symbol A, is the SI unit of electric current. It is defined by taking the fixed numerical value of the elementary charge e to be 1.602176634×10^{−19} when expressed in the unit C, which is equal to A⋅s, where the second is defined in terms of Δν_{Cs}.

The ampere may be expressed directly in terms of the defining constants as:

1 A = eΔν_{Cs}/((1.602176634×10^{−19})(9192631770))

For illustration, this is equivalent to defining one coulomb to be an exact specified multiple of the elementary charge.

1 C = e/(1.602176634×10^{−19})

Because the previous definition contains a reference to force, which has the dimensions MLT^{−2}, it follows that in the previous SI the kilogram, metre, and second – the base units representing these dimensions – had to be defined before the ampere could be defined. Other consequences of the previous definition were that in SI the value of vacuum permeability (μ_{0}) was fixed at exactly 4π×10^{−7} H⋅m^{−1}.

A consequence of the revised definition is that the ampere no longer depends on the definitions of the kilogram and the metre; it does, however, still depend on the definition of the second. In addition, the numerical values when expressed in SI units of the vacuum permeability, vacuum permittivity, and impedance of free space, which were exact before the redefinition, are subject to experimental error after the redefinition. For example, the numerical value of the vacuum permeability has a relative uncertainty equal to that of the experimental value of the fine-structure constant $\alpha$. The CODATA 2018 value for the relative standard uncertainty of $\alpha$ is 1.6×10^{−10}. (Note: A note should be added on the definition of magnetic field unit (tesla). When the ampere was defined as the current that when flows in two long parallel wires separated by 1 m causes a force of 2×10^{−7} N/m on each other, there was also another definition: the magnetic field at the location of each of the wires in this configuration was defined to be 2×10^{−7} T. Namely 1 T is the intensity of the magnetic field B that causes a force of 1 N/m on a wire carrying a current of 1 A. The number 2×10^{−7} was written also as μ_{0}/2π. This arbitrary definition is what made μ_{0} to be exactly 4π×10^{−7} H/m. Accordingly, the magnetic field near a wire carrying current is given by B = μ_{0}I/2πr. Now, with the new definition of the ampere, the definition of the tesla is also affected. More specifically, the definition relying on the force of a magnetic field on a wire carrying current is maintained (F = I⋅B⋅l) while, as mentioned above, μ_{0} can no longer be exactly 4π×10^{−7} H/m and has to be measured experimentally. The value of the vacuum permittivity ε_{0} = 1/(μ_{0}c^{2}) is also affected accordingly. The Maxwell equations will 'see to it' that the electrostatic force between two point charges will be F = 1/(4πε_{0})(q_{1}q_{2})/r^{2}.)

The ampere definition leads to exact values for

1 V = (1.602176634×10^{−19})/((6.62607015×10^{−34})(9192631770))hΔν_{Cs}/e
1 Wb = (1.602176634×10^{−19})/(6.62607015×10^{−34})h/e
1 Ω = ((1.602176634×10^{−19})^{2})/(6.62607015×10^{−34})h/e^{2}

=== Kelvin ===
The definition of the kelvin underwent a fundamental change. Rather than using the triple point of water to fix the temperature scale, the new definition uses the energy equivalent as given by Boltzmann's equation.

- Previous definition: The kelvin, unit of thermodynamic temperature, is 1/273.16 of the thermodynamic temperature of the triple point of water.
- 2019 definition: The kelvin, symbol K, is the SI unit of thermodynamic temperature. It is defined by taking the fixed numerical value of the Boltzmann constant k to be 1.380649×10^{−23} when expressed in the unit J⋅K^{−1}, which is equal to kg⋅m^{2}⋅s^{−2}⋅K^{−1}, where the kilogram, metre and second are defined in terms of h, c and Δν_{Cs}.

The kelvin may be expressed directly in terms of the defining constants as:

1 K = (1.380649×10^{−23})/((6.62607015×10^{−34})(9192631770))hΔν_{Cs}/k.

=== Mole ===
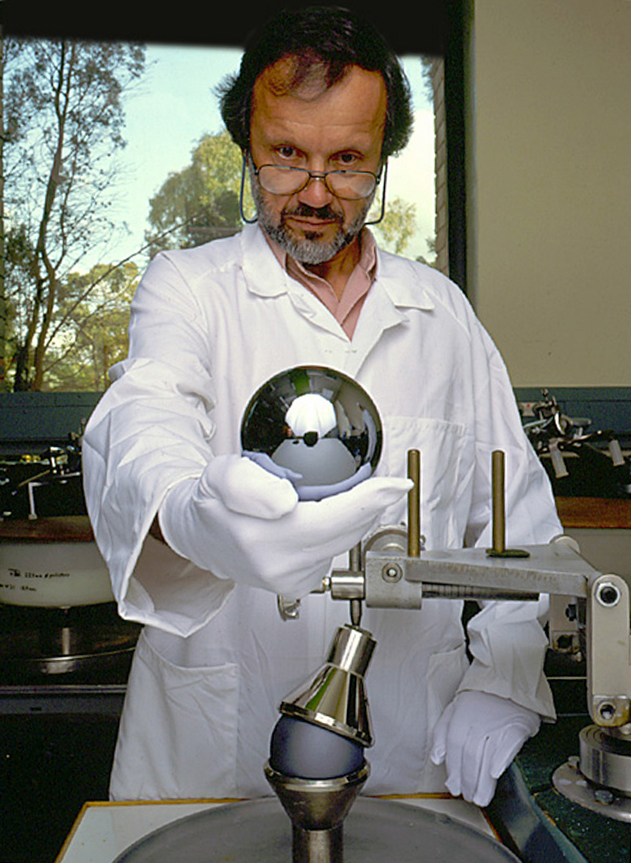
A near-perfect sphere of ultra-pure silicon – part of the now-defunct Avogadro project, an International Avogadro Coordination project to determine the Avogadro constant

The previous definition of the mole linked it to the kilogram. The revised definition breaks that link by making a mole a specific number of entities of the substance in question.

- Previous definition: The mole is the amount of substance of a system that contains as many elementary entities as there are atoms in 0.012 kilogram of carbon-12. When the mole is used, the elementary entities must be specified and may be atoms, molecules, ions, electrons, other particles, or specified groups of such particles.
- 2019 definition: The mole, symbol mol, is the SI unit of amount of substance. One mole contains exactly 6.02214076×10^{23} elementary entities. This number is the fixed numerical value of the Avogadro constant, N_{A}, when expressed in the unit mol^{−1} and is called the Avogadro number. The amount of substance, symbol n, of a system is a measure of the number of specified elementary entities. An elementary entity may be an atom, a molecule, an ion, an electron, any other particle or specified group of particles.

The mole may be expressed directly in terms of the defining constants as:

1 mol = 6.02214076×10^{23}/N_{A}.

One consequence of this change is that the previously defined relationship between the mass of the ^{12}C atom, the dalton, the kilogram, and the Avogadro constant is no longer exact. One of the following had to change:

- The mass of a ^{12}C atom, unbound and in its electronic and nuclear ground states, is exactly 12 dalton.
- The number of dalton in a gram is exactly the numerical value of the Avogadro constant: (i.e., 1 g/Da = 1 mol ⋅ N_{A}).

The wording of the 9th SI Brochure (Note: A footnote in Table 8 on non-SI units states: "The dalton (Da) and the unified atomic mass unit (u) are alternative names (and symbols) for the same unit, equal to 1/12 of the mass of a free carbon 12 atom, at rest and in its ground state.") implies that the first statement remains valid, which means the second is no longer exactly true. The molar mass constant, while still with great accuracy remaining 1 g/mol, is no longer exactly equal to that. Appendix 2 to the 9th SI Brochure states that "the molar mass of carbon 12, M(^{12}C), is equal to 0.012 kg⋅mol^{−1} within a relative standard uncertainty equal to that of the recommended value of N_{A}h at the time this resolution was adopted, namely 4.5×10^{−10}, and that in the future its value will be determined experimentally", which makes no reference to the dalton and is consistent with either statement.

=== Candela ===
The new definition of the candela is effectively the same as the previous definition as dependent on other base units, with the result that the redefinition of the kilogram and the additional rigour in the definitions of the second and metre propagate to the candela.

- Previous definition: The candela is the luminous intensity, in a given direction, of a source that emits monochromatic radiation of frequency 540×10^{12} Hz and that has a radiant intensity in that direction of 1/683 watt per steradian.
- 2019 definition: The candela, symbol cd, is the SI unit of luminous intensity in a given direction. It is defined by taking the fixed numerical value of the luminous efficacy of monochromatic radiation of frequency 540×10^{12} Hz, K_{cd}, to be 683 when expressed in the unit lm⋅W^{−1}, which is equal to cd⋅sr⋅W^{−1}, or cd⋅sr⋅kg^{−1}⋅m^{−2}⋅s^{3}, where the kilogram, metre and second are defined in terms of h, c and Δν_{Cs}.

The candela may be expressed directly in terms of the defining constants as:

1 cd = K_{cd}h(Δν_{Cs})^{2}/(683⋅(6.62607015×10^{−34})(9192631770)^{2})

== Impact on reproducibility ==
All seven of the SI base units are defined in terms of defined constants (Note: Though the three quantities temperature, luminous intensity and amount of substance may be regarded from a fundamental physical perspective as derived quantities, these are perceptually independent quantities and have conversion constants defined that relate the historically defined units to the underlying physics.) and universal physical constants. (Note: The definition of the candela is atypical within the base units; translating physical measurements of spectral intensity into units of candela also requires a model of the response of the human eye to different wavelengths of light known as the luminosity function and denoted by V(λ), a function that is determined by the International Commission on Illumination (CIE).) Seven constants are needed to define the seven base units but there is not a direct correspondence between each specific base unit and a specific constant; except the second and the mole, more than one of the seven constants contributes to the definition of any given base unit.

When the New SI was first designed, there were more than six suitable physical constants from which the designers could choose. For example, once length and time had been established, the universal gravitational constant G could, from a dimensional point of view, be used to define mass. (Note: The dimensions of G are L^{3}M^{−1}T^{−2} so once standards have been established for length and for time, mass can, in theory, be deduced from G. When fundamental constants as relations between these three units are set, the units can be deduced from a combination of these constants; for example, as a linear combination of Planck units.) In practice, G can only be measured with a relative uncertainty of the order of 10^{−5}, (Note: The following terms are defined in International vocabulary of metrology – Basic and general concepts and associated terms: measurement reproducibility – definition 2.25; standard measurement uncertainty – definition 2.30; relative standard measurement uncertainty – definition 2.32) which would have resulted in the upper limit of the kilogram's reproducibility being around 10^{−5} whereas the then-current international prototype of the kilogram can be measured with a reproducibility of 1.2 × 10^{−8}. The physical constants were chosen on the basis of minimal uncertainty associated with measuring the constant and the degree of independence of the constant in respect of other constants that were being used. Although the BIPM has developed a standard mise en pratique (practical technique) for each type of measurement, the mise en pratique used to make the measurement is not part of the measurement's definition – it is merely an assurance that the measurement can be done without exceeding the specified maximum uncertainty.

== Acceptance ==
Much of the work done by the CIPM is delegated to consultative committees. The CIPM Consultative Committee for Units (CCU) has made the proposed changes while other committees have examined the proposal in detail and have made recommendations regarding their acceptance by the CGPM in 2014. The consultative committees have laid down a number of criteria that must be met before they will support the CCU's proposal, including:

- For the redefinition of the kilogram, at least three separate experiments yielding values for the Planck constant having a relative expanded (95%) uncertainty of no more than 5×10^{−8} must be carried out and at least one of these values should be better than 2×10^{−8}. Both the Kibble balance and the Avogadro project should be included in the experiments and any differences between these must be reconciled.
- For the redefinition of the kelvin, the relative uncertainty of the Boltzmann constant derived from two fundamentally different methods such as acoustic gas thermometry and dielectric constant gas thermometry must be better than 10^{−6}, and these values must be corroborated by other measurements.

As of March 2011, the International Avogadro Coordination (IAC) group had obtained an uncertainty of 3.0×10^{−8} and NIST had obtained an uncertainty of 3.6×10^{−8} in their measurements. On 1 September 2012 the European Association of National Metrology Institutes (EURAMET) launched a formal project to reduce the relative difference between the Kibble balance and the silicon sphere approach to measuring the kilogram from (17±5)×10^{−8} to within 2×10^{−8}. As of March 2013 the proposed redefinition is known as the "New SI" but Mohr, in a paper following the CGPM proposal but predating the formal CCU proposal, suggested that because the proposed system makes use of atomic scale phenomena rather than macroscopic phenomena, it should be called the "Quantum SI System".

As of the 2014 CODATA-recommended values of the fundamental physical constants published in 2016 using data collected until the end of 2014, all measurements met the CGPM's requirements, and the redefinition and the next CGPM quadrennial meeting in late 2018 could now proceed.

On 20 October 2017, the 106th meeting of the International Committee for Weights and Measures (CIPM) formally accepted a revised Draft Resolution A, calling for the redefinition of the SI, to be voted on at the 26th CGPM, The same day, in response to the CIPM's endorsement of the final values, the CODATA Task Group on Fundamental Constants published its 2017 recommended values for the four constants with uncertainties and proposed numerical values for the redefinition without uncertainty. The vote, which was held on 16 November 2018 at the 26th CGPM, was unanimous; all attending national representatives voted in favour of the revised proposal.

The new definitions became effective on 20 May 2019.

== Concerns ==
In 2010, Marcus Foster of the Australian Commonwealth Scientific and Industrial Research Organisation (CSIRO) published a wide-ranging critique of the SI; he raised numerous issues ranging from basic issues such as the absence of the symbol "Ω" (omega, used for the ohm) from most Western computer keyboards to abstract issues such as inadequate formalism in the metrological concepts on which SI is based. The changes proposed in the new SI only addressed problems with the definition of the base units, including new definitions of the candela and the mole – units Foster argued are not true base units. Other issues raised by Foster fell outside the scope of the proposal.

=== Explicit-unit and explicit-constant definitions ===
Concerns have been expressed that the use of explicit-constant definitions of the unit being defined that are not related to an example of its quantity will have many adverse effects. Although this criticism applies to the linking of the kilogram to the Planck constant h via a route that requires a knowledge of both special relativity and quantum mechanics, it does not apply to the definition of the ampere, which is closer to an example of its quantity than is the previous definition. Some observers have welcomed the change to base the definition of electric current on the charge of the electron rather than the previous definition of a force between two parallel, current-carrying wires; because the nature of the electromagnetic interaction between two bodies is somewhat different at the quantum electrodynamics level than at classical electrodynamic levels, it is considered inappropriate to use classical electrodynamics to define quantities that exist at quantum electrodynamic levels.

=== Mass and the Avogadro constant ===
When the scale of the divergence between the IPK and national kilogram prototypes was reported in 2005, a debate began about whether the kilogram should be defined in terms of the mass of the silicon-28 atom or by using the Kibble balance. If the mass of a silicon atom were to be determined by the Avogadro project using the Avogadro constant, it could be linked directly to the kilogram. Concerns that the authors of the proposal had failed to address the impact of breaking the link between the mole, kilogram, dalton, and the Avogadro constant (N_{A}) have also been expressed. (Note: The two quantities of the Avogadro constant N_{A} and the Avogadro number N_{N} are numerically identical but while N_{A} has the unit mol^{−1}, N_{N} is a pure number.) This direct link has caused many to argue that the mole is not a true physical unit but, according to the Swedish philosopher Johansson, a "scaling factor".

The 8th edition of the SI Brochure defined the dalton in terms of the mass of an atom of ^{12}C. It defined the Avogadro constant in terms of this mass and the kilogram, making it determined by experiment. The redefinition fixes the Avogadro constant and the 9th SI Brochure retains the definition of dalton in terms of ^{12}C, with the effect that the link between the dalton and the kilogram will be broken.

In 1993, the International Union of Pure and Applied Chemistry (IUPAC) approved the use of the dalton (unit) as an alternative name for the unified atomic mass unit with the qualification that the CGPM had not given its approval. This approval has since been given. Following the proposal to redefine the mole by fixing the value of the Avogadro constant, Brian Leonard of the University of Akron, writing in Metrologia, proposed that the dalton (Da) be redefined such that N_{A} = (g/Da) mol^{−1}, but that the unified atomic mass unit (m_{u}) retain its current definition based on the mass of ^{12}C, ceasing to exactly equal the dalton. This would result in the dalton and the atomic mass unit potentially differing from each other with a relative uncertainty of the order of 10^{−10}. The 9th SI Brochure, however, defines both the dalton (Da) and the unified atomic mass unit (u) as exactly 1/12 of the mass of a free carbon-12 atom and not in relation to the kilogram, with the effect that the above equation will be inexact.

=== Temperature ===
Different temperature ranges need different measurement methods. Room temperature can be measured by means of expansion and contraction of a liquid in a thermometer but high temperatures are often associated with colour of blackbody radiation. Wojciech T. Chyla, approaching the structure of SI from a philosophical point of view in the Journal of the Polish Physical Society, argued that temperature is not a real base unit but is an average of the thermal energies of the individual particles that comprise the body concerned. He noted that in many theoretical papers, temperature is represented by the quantities Θ or β where

$$\Theta=k T; \quad \beta = \frac{1}{k T}$$

and k is the Boltzmann constant. Chyla acknowledged, however, that in the macroscopic world, temperature plays the role of a base unit because much of the theory of thermodynamics is based on temperature.

The Consultative Committee for Thermometry, part of the International Committee for Weights and Measures, publishes a mise en pratique (practical technique), last updated in 1990, for measuring temperature. At very low and at very high temperatures it often links energy to temperature via the Boltzmann constant.

=== Luminous intensity ===
Foster argued that "luminous intensity [the candela] is not a physical quantity, but a photobiological quantity that exists in human perception", questioning whether the candela should be a base unit. Before the 1979 decision to define photometric units in terms of luminous flux (power) rather than luminous intensities of standard light sources, there was already doubt whether there should still be a separate base unit for photometry. Furthermore, there was unanimous agreement that the lumen was now more fundamental than the candela. However, for the sake of continuity the candela was kept as base unit.

== See also ==
- International System of Units – Modern form of the metric system
- International Vocabulary of Metrology – Project to find a common language and terminology in the science of measurements
- Physical constant – Universal and unchanging physical quantity
- SI base unit – One of the seven units of measurement that define the metric system
- 2005–2019 definitions of the SI base units
- Non-SI units mentioned in the SI – Modern form of the metric system – changes associated with the 2019 redefinition
