= Grave (unit) =

Predecessor to the kilogram

grave
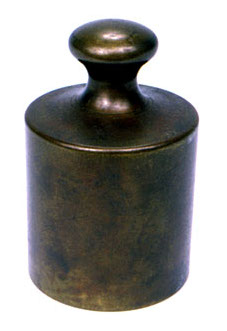
- One of the original prototypes of the grave made in 1793 and now kept at the NIST Museum

General information
- Unit of: mass
- Symbol: gv

The grave (/ɡræv/, French: [ɡʁav]), abbreviated gv, is the unit of mass used in the first metric system, which was implemented in France in 1793. In 1795, the grave was renamed as the kilogram.

== Origin ==
The modern kilogram has its origins in the Age of Enlightenment and the French Revolution. In 1790 an influential proposal by Talleyrand called for a new system of units, including a unit of length derived from an invariable length in nature, and a unit of mass (then called weight) equal to the mass of a unit volume of water. In 1791, the Commission of Weights and Measures, appointed by the French Academy of Sciences, chose one ten-millionth of the half meridian as the unit of length, and named it metre. Initially a provisional value was used, based on the meridian measurement made in 1740 by Lacaille.

In 1793 the commission defined the unit of mass as a cubic decimetre of distilled water at 0 °C, and gave it the name grave. Two supplemental unit names, gravet (0.001 grave), and bar (1000 grave), were added to cover the same range as the old units, resulting in the following decimal series of units: milligravet, centigravet, decigravet, gravet, centigrave, decigrave, grave, centibar, decibar, bar. As measured by the customary unit of mass in use in France at the time, the mass of the new unit volume (1 dm^{3}_{provisional}) of water at 0 °C was determined by Lavoisier and Haüy to be 18841 grains.

Since a mass standard made of water would be inconvenient and unstable, the regulation of commerce necessitated the manufacture of a practical realisation of the water-based definition of mass. Accordingly, a provisional mass standard of the grave was made as a single-piece, metallic artefact.

== Transition to the kilogram ==
On 7 April 1795, the gram was decreed in France to be "the absolute weight of a volume of pure water equal to the cube of the hundredth part of the metre, and at the temperature of melting ice". The law also replaced the three names gravet, grave and bar by a single generic unit name: the gram. The new gram was equal to the old gravet. Four new prefixes (deca, hecto, kilo, and myria) were added to the metric system to cover almost the same range of units as in 1793 (milligram, centigram, decigram, gram, decagram, hectogram, kilogram, myriagram). The brass prototype of the grave was renamed to provisional kilogram.

In 1799 the provisional units were replaced by the final ones. Delambre and Méchain had completed their new measurement of the meridian, and the final metre was 0.03% smaller than the provisional one. Hence the final kilogram, being the mass of one cubic decimetre of water, was 0.09% lighter than the provisional one. In addition, the temperature specification of the water was changed from 0 °C to the point where the density of water is maximal (about 4 °C). This change of temperature added 0.01% to the final kilogram. At the same time, work was commissioned to precisely determine the mass of a cubic decimetre (one litre) of water. (Note: The same decree also defined the litre as follows: "Litre: the measure of volume, both for liquid and solids, for which the displacement would be that of a cube [with sides measuring] one-tenth of a metre." Original text: "Litre, la mesure de capacité, tant pour les liquides que pour les matières sèches, dont la contenance sera celle du cube de la dixièrne partie du mètre.") Although the decreed definition of the kilogram specified water at 0 °C—its highly stable temperature point—the French chemist Louis Lefèvre-Gineau and the Italian naturalist Giovanni Fabbroni chose to redefine the standard in 1799 to water's most stable density point: the temperature at which water reaches maximum density, which was measured at the time as 4 °C. (Note: Modern measurements show the temperature at which water reaches maximum density is 3.984 °C. However, the scientists at the close of the 18th century concluded that the temperature was 4 °C.) They concluded that one cubic decimetre of water at its maximum density was equal to 99.9265% of the target mass of the provisional kilogram standard made four years earlier.

== Kilogramme des Archives ==
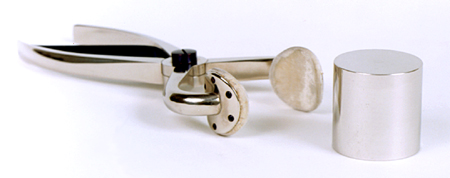
The Arago kilogram, a copy of the Kilogramme des Archives commissioned in 1821 by the US under supervision of French physicist François Arago that served as the US's first kilogram standard of mass.

After the definitions were finalized in 1799, an all-platinum kilogram prototype was fabricated with the objective that it would equal, as close as was scientifically feasible for the day, the mass of one cubic decimetre of water at 4 °C. It was called the Kilogramme des Archives as it was stored in the Archives Nationales in Paris. The prototype was presented to the Archives of the Republic in June, and on 10 December 1799, the prototype was formally ratified as the Kilogramme des Archives (Kilogram of the Archives) and the kilogram was defined as being equal to its mass. This standard stood for the next ninety years, until being replaced in 1889 by the platinum–iridium International Prototype of the Kilogram (IPK).

== See also ==
- Gram
- International System of Units (SI)
- Kilogram
- Kilogram-force
- List of unusual units of measurement
- Mass
- Metric prefix
- Metric system
- SI base units
- SI derived units
