= International Prototype of the Kilogram =

Object that defined the kilogram (1889–2019)

- NIST: K20, the US National Prototype Kilogram resting on an egg crate fluorescent light panel
- BIPM: Steam cleaning a 1 kg prototype before a mass comparison
- BIPM: The IPK and its six sister copies in their vault
- NIST: This particular Rueprecht Balance, an Austrian-made precision balance, was used by the NIST from 1945 until 1960
- BIPM: The FB‑2 flexure-strip balance, the BIPM's modern precision balance featuring a standard deviation of one ten-billionth of a kilogram (0.1 μg)
- BIPM: Mettler HK1000 balance, featuring 1 μg resolution and a 4 kg maximum mass. Also used by NIST and Sandia National Laboratories' Primary Standards Laboratory

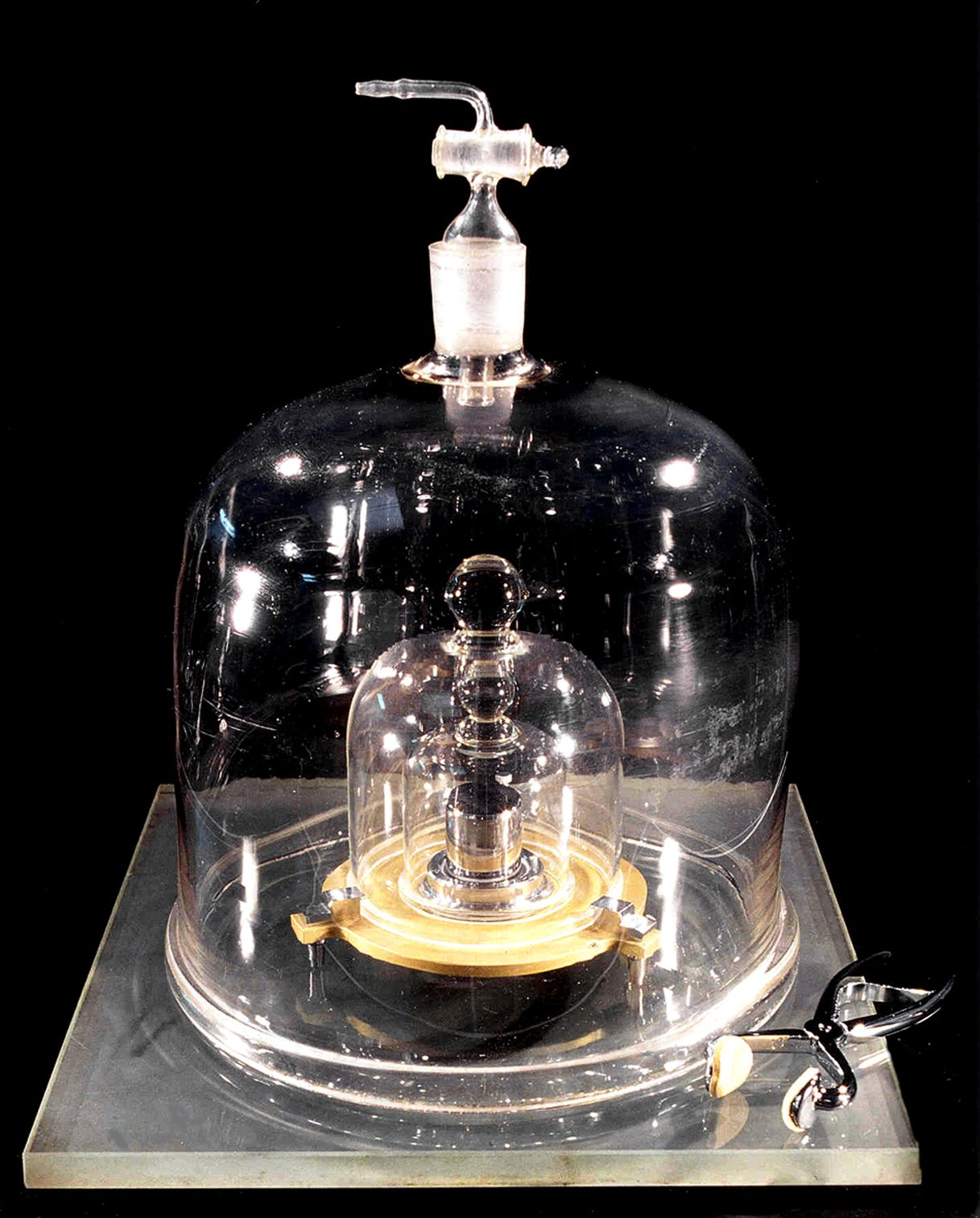
The International Prototype Kilogram, stored in a vault in Paris, was replaced in 2019 by a formula that uses the Planck constant, since the IPK’s mass is unstable over time.

The International Prototype of the Kilogram (referred to by metrologists as the IPK or Le Grand K; sometimes called the ur-kilogram, or urkilogram, particularly by German-language authors writing in English^{:30}) is an object whose mass was used to define the kilogram from 1889, when it replaced the Kilogramme des Archives, until 2019, when it was replaced by a new definition of the kilogram based entirely on physical constants. During that time, the IPK and its duplicates were used to calibrate all other kilogram mass standards on Earth.

The IPK is a roughly golfball-sized object made of a platinum–iridium alloy known as "Pt‑10Ir", which is 90% platinum and 10% iridium (by mass) and is machined into a right-circular cylinder with perpendicular height equal to its diameter of about 39 millimetres to reduce its surface area. The addition of 10% iridium improved upon the all-platinum Kilogramme des Archives by greatly increasing hardness while still retaining platinum's many virtues: extreme resistance to oxidation, extremely high density (almost twice as dense as lead and more than 21 times as dense as water), satisfactory electrical and thermal conductivities, and low magnetic susceptibility.

By 2018, the IPK underpinned the definitions of four of the seven SI base units: the kilogram itself, plus the mole, ampere, and candela (whose definitions at the time referenced the gram, newton, and watt respectively) as well as the definitions of every named SI derived unit except the hertz, becquerel, degree Celsius, gray, sievert, farad, ohm, siemens, henry, radian, and steradian.

The IPK and its six sister copies are stored at the International Bureau of Weights and Measures (known by its French-language initials BIPM) in a controlled environment in a basement vault at the BIPM's Pavillon de Breteuil in Saint-Cloud (Note: The Pavillon's (and hence the BIPM's) postal address is in the neighbouring commune of Sèvres, so it is often reported as being located there, but the grounds are in the commune of Saint-Cloud (OpenStreetMap).) on the outskirts of Paris (see External images, below, for photographs). Three independently controlled keys are required to open the vault. Official copies of the IPK were made available to other nations to serve as their national standards. These were compared to the IPK roughly every 40 years, thereby providing traceability of local measurements back to the IPK.

== Creation ==
The Metre Convention was signed on 20 May 1875 and further formalised the metric system (a predecessor to the SI), quickly leading to the production of the IPK. The IPK is one of three cylinders made in London in 1879 by Johnson Matthey, which continued to manufacture nearly all of the national prototypes as needed until the new definition of the kilogram came into effect in 2019. In 1883, the mass of the IPK was found to be indistinguishable from that of the Kilogramme des Archives made eighty-four years prior, and was formally ratified as the kilogram by the 1st CGPM in 1889.

== Copies of the IPK ==
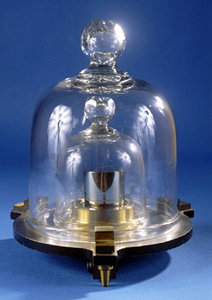
National prototype kilogram K20, one of two prototypes stored at the US National Institute of Standards and Technology in Gaithersburg, Maryland, which served as primary standards for defining all units of mass and weight in the United States. This is a replica for public display, shown as it is normally stored, under two bell jars.

The IPK and its various copies are given the following designations in the literature:

- The IPK itself, stored in the BIPM's vault in Saint-Cloud, France.
- Six sister copies: K1, 7, 8(41), (Note: Prototype No. 8(41) was accidentally stamped with the number 41, but its accessories carry the proper number 8. Since there is no prototype marked 8, this prototype is referred to as 8(41).) 32, 43 and 47. Stored in the same vault at the BIPM.
- Ten working copies: eight (9, 31, 42′, 63, 77, 88, 91, and 650 (Note: Nos. 42′, 77 and 650 are called "standards" rather than "prototypes" because they are slightly underweight, slightly too much material having been removed when they were manufactured. Other than being more than 1 mg below the nominal 1 kg mass, they are identical to the prototypes, and are used during routine calibration work.)) for routine use and two (25 and 73) for special use. Kept in the BIPM's calibration laboratory in Saint-Cloud, France.
- National prototypes, stored in Argentina (30), Australia (44 and 87), Austria (49), Belgium (28 and 37), Brazil (66), Canada (50 and 74), China (60 and 64; 75 in Hong Kong), Czech Republic (67), Denmark (48), Egypt (58), Finland (23), France (35), Germany (52, 55 and 70), Hungary (16), India (57), Indonesia (46), Israel (71), Italy (5 and 76), Japan (6, 94 and E59), Kazakhstan, Kenya (95), Mexico (21, 90 and 96), Netherlands (53), North Korea (68), Norway (36), Pakistan (93), Poland (51), Portugal (69), Romania (2), Russia (12 and 26), Serbia (11 and 29), Singapore (83), Slovakia (41 and 65), South Africa (56), South Korea (39, 72 and 84), Spain (24 and 3), Sweden (40 and 86), Switzerland (38 and 89), Taiwan (78), Thailand (80), Turkey (54), United Kingdom (18, 81 and 82), and the United States (20, 4, 79, 85 and 92).
- Some additional copies held by non-national organisations, such as the French Academy of Sciences in Paris (34) and the Istituto di Metrologia G. Colonnetti in Turin (62).

== Stability of the IPK ==
Before 2019, by definition, the error in the measured value of the IPK's mass was exactly zero; the mass of the IPK was the kilogram. However, any changes in the IPK's mass over time could be deduced by comparing its mass to that of its official copies stored throughout the world, a rarely undertaken process called "periodic verification". The only three verifications occurred in 1889, 1948, and 1989. For instance, the US owns five 90% platinum / 10% iridium (Pt‑10Ir) kilogram standards, two of which, K4 and K20, are from the original batch of 40 replicas distributed in 1884. (Note: The other two Pt‑10Ir standards owned by the US are K79, from a new series of prototypes (K64–K80) that were diamond-turned directly to a finish mass, and K85, which is used for Kibble balance experiments.) The K20 prototype was designated as the primary national standard of mass for the US. Both of these, as well as those from other nations, are periodically returned to the BIPM for verification. Great care is exercised when transporting prototypes. In 1984, the K4 and K20 prototypes were hand-carried in the passenger section of separate commercial flights.

None of the replicas has a mass precisely equal to that of the IPK; their masses are calibrated and documented as offset values. For instance, K20, the US's primary standard, originally had an official mass of 1 kg − 39 μg (micrograms) in 1889; that is to say, K20 was 39 μg less than the IPK. A verification performed in 1948 showed a mass of 1 kg − 19 μg. The latest verification performed in 1989 shows a mass precisely identical to its original 1889 value. Quite unlike transient variations such as this, the US's check standard, K4, has persistently declined in mass relative to the IPK—and for an identifiable reason: check standards are used much more often than primary standards and are prone to scratches and other wear. K4 was originally delivered with an official mass of 1 kg − 75 μg in 1889, but as of 1989 was officially calibrated at 1 kg − 106 μg and ten years later was 1 kg − 116 μg. Over a period of 110 years, K4 lost 41 μg relative to the IPK.

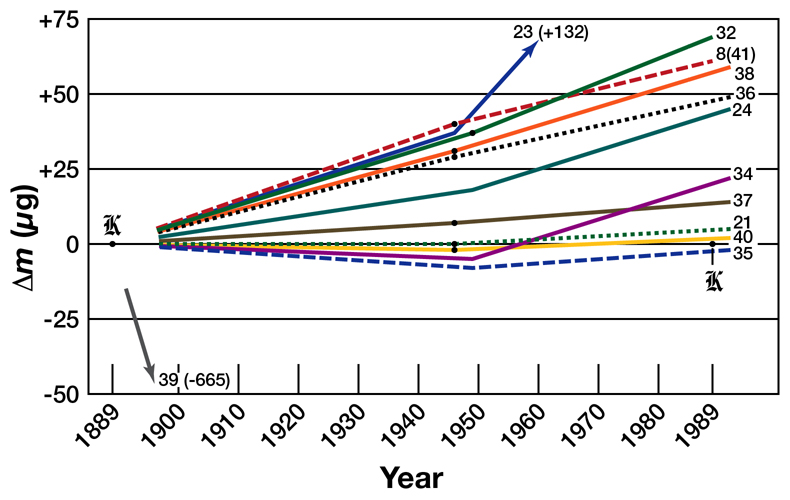
Mass drift over time of national prototypes K21–K40, plus two of the IPK's sister copies: K32 and K8(41). All mass changes are relative to the IPK. The initial 1889 starting-value offsets relative to the IPK have been nulled. The above are all relative measurements; no historical mass-measurement data is available to determine which of the prototypes has been most stable relative to an invariant of nature. There is the distinct possibility that all the prototypes gained mass over 100 years and that K21, K35, K40, and the IPK simply gained less than the others.

Beyond the simple wear that check standards can experience, the mass of even the carefully stored national prototypes can drift relative to the IPK for a variety of reasons, some known and some unknown. Since the IPK and its replicas are stored in air (albeit under two or more nested bell jars), they gain mass through adsorption of atmospheric contamination onto their surfaces. Accordingly, they are cleaned in a process the BIPM developed between 1939 and 1946 known as "the BIPM cleaning method" that comprises firmly rubbing with a chamois soaked in equal parts ether and ethanol, followed by steam cleaning with bi-distilled water, and allowing the prototypes to settle for 7–10 days before verification. Before the BIPM's published report in 1994 detailing the relative change in mass of the prototypes, different standard bodies used different techniques to clean their prototypes. The NIST's practice before then was to soak and rinse its two prototypes first in benzene, then in ethanol, and to then clean them with a jet of bi-distilled water steam. Cleaning the prototypes removes between 5 and 60 μg of contamination depending largely on the time elapsed since the last cleaning. Further, a second cleaning can remove up to 10 μg more. After cleaning—even when they are stored under their bell jars—the IPK and its replicas immediately begin gaining mass again. The BIPM even developed a model of this gain and concluded that it averaged 1.11 μg per month for the first 3 months after cleaning and then decreased to an average of about 1 μg per year thereafter. Since check standards like K4 are not cleaned for routine calibrations of other mass standards—a precaution to minimise the potential for wear and handling damage—the BIPM's model of time-dependent mass gain has been used as an "after cleaning" correction factor.

Because the first forty official copies are made of the same alloy as the IPK and are stored under similar conditions, periodic verification using a number of replicas—especially the national primary standards, which are rarely used—can convincingly demonstrate the stability of the IPK. What has become clear after the third periodic verification performed between 1988 and 1992 is that masses of the entire worldwide ensemble of prototypes have been slowly but inexorably diverging from each other. It is also clear that the IPK lost perhaps 50 μg of mass over the last century, and possibly significantly more, in comparison to its official copies. The reason for this drift has eluded physicists who have dedicated their careers to the SI unit of mass. No plausible mechanism has been proposed to explain either a steady decrease in the mass of the IPK, or an increase in that of its replicas dispersed throughout the world. (Note: If the 50 μg difference between the IPK and its replicas was entirely due to wear, the IPK would have to have lost 150 million billion more platinum and iridium atoms over the last century than its replicas. That there would be this much wear, much less a difference of this magnitude, is thought unlikely; 50 μg is roughly the mass of a fingerprint. Specialists at the BIPM in 1946 carefully conducted cleaning experiments and concluded that even vigorous rubbing with a chamois—if done carefully—did not alter the prototypes' mass. More recent cleaning experiments at the BIPM, which were conducted on one particular prototype (K63), and which benefited from the then-new NBS‑2 balance, demonstrated 2 μg stability. Experiments on prototypes No. 7 and 32 in January 2014 showed less than 0.5 μg mass lost from a third complete cleaning and washing cycle. Many theories have been advanced to explain the divergence in the masses of the prototypes. One theory posits that the relative change in mass between the IPK and its replicas is not one of loss at all and is instead a simple matter that the IPK has gained less than the replicas. This theory begins with the observation that the IPK is uniquely stored under three nested bell jars whereas its six sister copies stored alongside it in the vault as well as the other replicas dispersed throughout the world are stored under only two. This theory is also founded on two other facts: that platinum has a strong affinity for mercury, and that atmospheric mercury is significantly more abundant in the atmosphere today than at the time the IPK and its replicas were manufactured. The burning of coal is a major contributor to atmospheric mercury and both Denmark and Germany have high coal shares in electrical generation. Conversely, electrical generation in France, where the IPK is stored, is mostly nuclear. This theory is supported by the fact that the mass divergence rate—relative to the IPK—of Denmark's prototype, K48, since it took possession in 1949 is an especially high 78 μg per century while that of Germany's prototype has been even greater at 126 μg/century ever since it took possession of K55 in 1954. However, still other data for other replicas isn't supportive of this theory. This mercury absorption theory is just one of many advanced by the specialists to account for the relative change in mass. To date, each theory has either proven implausible, or there are insufficient data or technical means to either prove or disprove it.) Moreover, there are no technical means available to determine whether or not the entire worldwide ensemble of prototypes suffers from even greater long-term trends upwards or downwards because their mass "relative to an invariant of nature is unknown at a level below 1000 μg over a period of 100 or even 50 years". Given the lack of data identifying which of the world's kilogram prototypes has been most stable in absolute terms, it is equally valid to state that the first batch of replicas has, as a group, gained an average of about 25 μg over one hundred years in comparison to the IPK. (Note: The mean change in mass of the first batch of replicas relative to the IPK over one hundred years is +23.5 μg with a standard deviation of 30 μg. Per The Third Periodic Verification of National Prototypes of the Kilogram (1988–1992), G. Girard, Metrologia 31 (1994) Pg. 323, Table 3. Data is for prototypes K1, K5, K6, K7, K8(41), K12, K16, K18, K20, K21, K24, K32, K34, K35, K36, K37, K38, and K40; and excludes K2, K23, and K39, which are treated as outliers. This is a larger data set than is shown in the chart at the top of this section, which corresponds to Figure 7 of G. Girard's 1994 paper.)

What is known specifically about the IPK is that it exhibits a short-term instability of about 30 μg over a period of about a month in its after-cleaned mass. The precise reason for this short-term instability is not understood but is thought to entail surface effects: microscopic differences between the prototypes' polished surfaces, possibly aggravated by hydrogen absorption due to catalysis of the volatile organic compounds that slowly deposit onto the prototypes as well as the hydrocarbon-based solvents used to clean them.

It has been possible to rule out many explanations of the observed divergences in the masses of the world's prototypes proposed by scientists and the general public. The BIPM's FAQ explains, for example, that the divergence is dependent on the amount of time elapsed between measurements and not dependent on the number of times the prototype or its copies have been cleaned or possible changes in gravity or environment. Reports published in 2013 by Peter Cumpson of Newcastle University based on the X-ray photoelectron spectroscopy of samples that were stored alongside various prototype kilograms suggested that one source of the divergence between the various prototypes could be traced to mercury that had been absorbed by the prototypes being in the proximity of mercury-based instruments. The IPK has been stored within centimetres of a mercury thermometer since at least as far back as the late 1980s. In this Newcastle University work six platinum weights made in the nineteenth century were all found to have mercury at the surface, the most contaminated of which had the equivalent of 250 μg of mercury when scaled to the surface area of a kilogram prototype.

The increasing divergence in the masses of the world's prototypes and the short-term instability in the IPK prompted research into improved methods to obtain a smooth surface finish using diamond turning on newly manufactured replicas and was one of the reasons for the redefinition of the kilogram.

== Dependency of the SI on the IPK ==
Until May 2019, the magnitude of many of the units composing the SI system of measurement, including most of those used in the measurement of electricity and light, were highly dependent upon the stability of IPK.

The stability of the IPK was crucial because the kilogram underpinned much of the SI as defined and structured until 2019. The majority of SI units with special names are derived units, meaning they are defined simply multiplying or dividing or in one case offsetting relative to other, more basic, units. For instance, the newton is defined as the force necessary to accelerate one kilogram at one metre per second squared. If the mass of the IPK were to change slightly then the newton would also change proportionally. In turn, the pascal, the SI unit of pressure, is defined in terms of the newton. This chain of dependency follows to many other SI units of measure. For instance, the joule, the SI unit of energy, is defined as that expended when a force of one newton acts through one metre. Next to be affected is the SI unit of power, the watt, which is one joule per second.

- N = kg m/s^{2}
- Pa = N/m^{2} = kg/(m s)
- J = N m = kg m^{2}/s^{2}
- W = J/s = N m/s = kg m^{2}/s^{3}

Furthermore, prior to the revision the SI base unit of electric current, the ampere (A), was defined as the current needed to produce a force of 0.2 μN between 2 parallel wires 1 m apart for every metre of length. Substituting these parameters into Ampère's force law gives:

- 2 k_{A} A^{2}/m = 0.2 μN/m

or

- A^{2} = μN/(10 k_{A}),

making the magnitude of the ampere proportional to the square root of the newton and hence of the mass of the IPK.

The base unit of amount of substance, mole, was defined prior to the revision as the number of atoms in 12 grams of carbon 12 and the base unit of luminous intensity, candela, was defined as that of 1/683 watts per steradian of 540 THz green light. Hence the magnitudes of the mole and candela were proportional to the mass of the IPK.

These dependencies then extend to many chemical, photometric, and electrical units:

- kat = mol/s
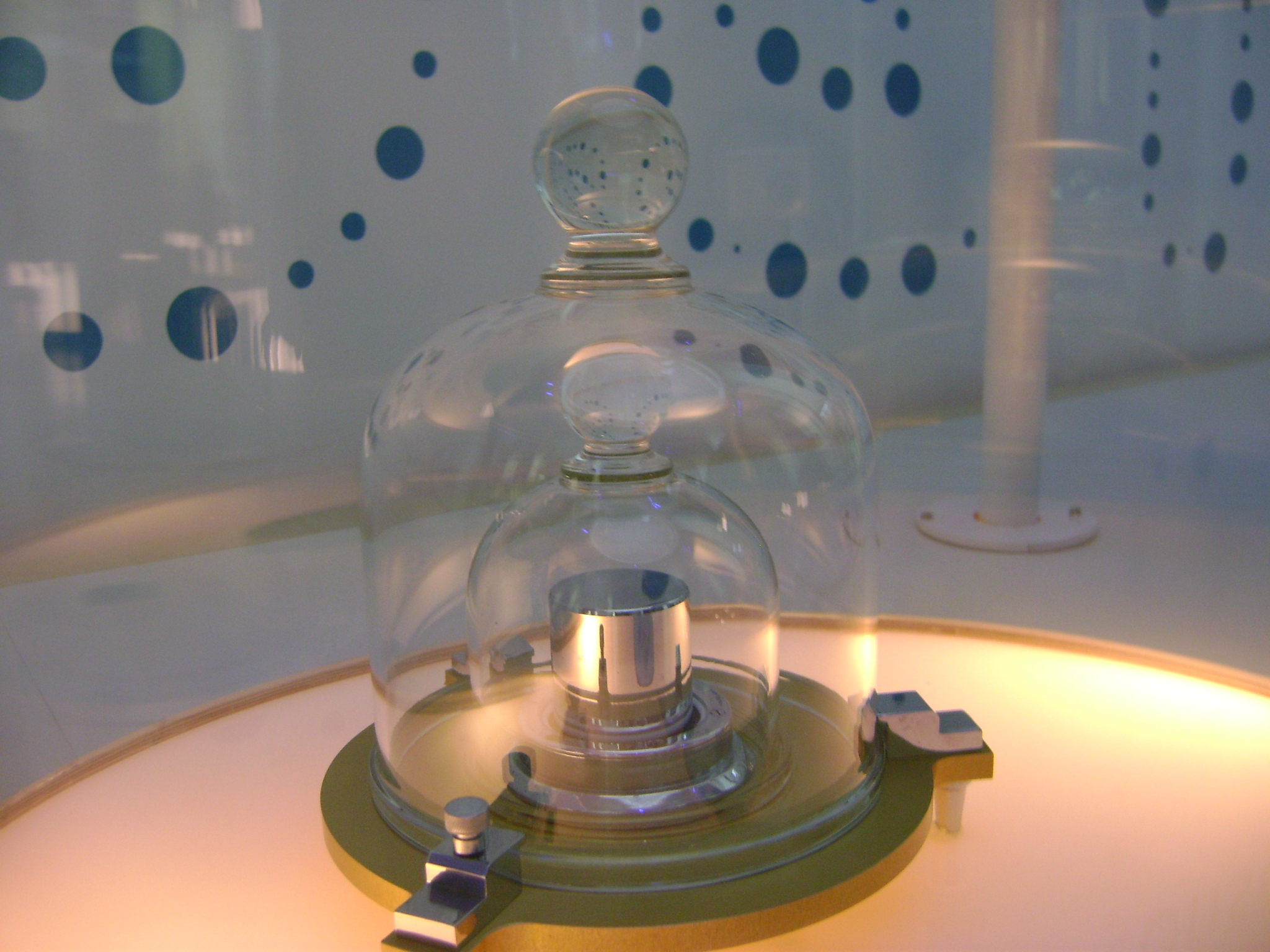
- A replica of the prototype kilogram on display at Cité des Sciences et de l'Industrie in Paris, featuring the protective double glass bell.
  lm = cd sr
- lx = lm/m^{2} = cd sr/m^{2}
- C = A s
- V = W/A = J/C = J/(A s) = (kg m^{2})/(A s^{3})
- Wb = V s = J/A = (kg m^{2})/(A s^{2})
- T = Wb/m^{2} = kg/(A s^{2})

The SI derived units whose values were not susceptible to changes in the mass of the IPK were either dimensionless quantities, derived entirely from the second, metre, or kelvin, or were defined as the ratio of 2 quantities, both of which were related in the same way to the mass of the IPK, for example:

- Ω = V/A = W/A/A = W/A^{2} = (N m/s)/(μN/10 k_{A}) = m/s/(10^{−6}/10 k_{A}) = 10^{7} k_{A} m/s

Here the newtons in the numerator and the denominator exactly cancel out when calculating the value of the ohm. Similarly:

- F = C/V = (A s)/W/A = (A^{2} s^{2})/J = (μN s^{2})/(10 k_{A} N m) = (10^{−7} s^{2})/(k_{A} m)
- Gy = J/kg = (kg m^{2}/s^{2})/kg = m^{2}/s^{2}
- S = 1/Ω = (10^{−7} s)/(k_{A} m)
- H = Ω s = 10^{7} k_{A} m

Because the magnitude of many of the units composing the SI system of measurement was until 2019 defined by its mass, the quality of the IPK was diligently protected to preserve the integrity of the SI system. However, the average mass of the worldwide ensemble of prototypes and the mass of the IPK have likely diverged another 8.8 μg since the third periodic verification 37 years ago. (Note: Assuming the past trend continues, whereby the mean change in mass of the first batch of replicas relative to the IPK over one hundred years was +23.5 σ30 μg.) Further, the world's national metrology laboratories must wait for the fourth periodic verification to confirm whether the historical trends persisted.

=== Insulating effects of practical realisations ===
Definitions of the SI units are quite different from their practical realisations. For instance, the metre is defined as the distance light travels in a vacuum during a time interval of 1/299,792,458 of a second. However, the metre's practical realisation typically takes the form of a helium–neon laser, and the metre's length is delineated—not defined—as 1579800.298728 wavelengths of light from this laser. Now suppose that the official measurement of the second was found to have drifted by a few parts per billion (it is actually extremely stable with a reproducibility of a few parts in 10^{15}). There would be no automatic effect on the metre because the second—and thus the metre's length—is abstracted via the laser comprising the metre's practical realisation. Scientists performing metre calibrations would simply continue to measure out the same number of laser wavelengths until an agreement was reached to do otherwise. The same is true with regard to the real-world dependency on the kilogram: if the mass of the IPK was found to have changed slightly, there would be no automatic effect upon the other units of measure because their practical realisations provide an insulating layer of abstraction. Any discrepancy would eventually have to be reconciled though, because the virtue of the SI system is its precise mathematical and logical harmony amongst its units. If the IPK's value were to have been definitively proven to have changed, one solution would have been to simply redefine the kilogram as being equal to the mass of the IPK plus an offset value, similarly to what had previously been done with its replicas; e.g., "the kilogram is equal to the mass of the IPK + 42 parts per billion" (equivalent to 42 μg).

The long-term solution to this problem, however, was to liberate the SI system from its dependency on the IPK by developing a practical realisation of the kilogram that can be reproduced in different laboratories by following a written specification. The units of measure in such a practical realisation would have their magnitudes precisely defined and expressed in terms of only physical constants. While major portions of the SI system are still based on the kilogram, the kilogram is now in turn based on invariant, universal constants of nature.

== See also ==
- Outline of metrology and measurement
- International Prototype Metre (IPM)
