= Maximum density =

Highest attainable density of a substance under given conditions

The maximum density of a substance is the highest attainable density of the substance under given conditions.

== Attaining maximum density ==
Almost all known substances undergo thermal expansion in response to heating, meaning that a given mass of substance contracts to a low volume at low temperatures, when little thermal energy is present. Substances, especially fluids in which intermolecular forces are weak, also undergo compression upon the application of pressure. Nearly all substances therefore reach a density maximum at very low temperatures and very high pressures, characteristic properties of the solid state of matter.

== Water ==
An especially notable irregular maximum density is that of water, which reaches a density peak at 4 °C (39 °F). This has important ramifications in Earth's ecosystem.

== See also ==
- List of elements by density
- Density
- Specific Gravity
- Specific weight
- Charge density
- Buoyancy
- Hydrometer
