= IRAP PhD Program =

International relativistic astrophysics PhD program, or IRAP PhD program is the international joint doctorate program in relativistic astrophysics initiated and co-sponsored by ICRANet. During 2010-2017 IRAP PhD takes part in the Erasmus Mundus program of the European Commission. For the first time in Europe the IRAP PhD program grants a joint PhD degree among the participating institutions.

== Education in relativistic astrophysics ==
In 2005 a new international organization was founded: the International Center for Relativistic Astrophysics Network (ICRANet), dedicated to the theoretical aspects of relativistic astrophysics. Together with the University of Arizona, the University of Stanford and the International Centre for Relativistic Astrophysics (ICRA), such states as Armenia, Brazil, Italy and the Vatican are the founding members of ICRANet. As a first step, the international relativistic astrophysics Ph.D. program (IRAP Ph.D.) was established in 2005. Among the proponents of the IRAP Ph.D. program are Riccardo Giacconi, Roy Kerr and Remo Ruffini.

== The objectives of the program ==
The IRAP Ph.D. program grants a joint Ph.D. degree among the participating institutions.

The core of the program is the international consortium. It assembles expertise of its members for preparation of scientists in the field of relativistic astrophysics, and related fields of general relativity, cosmology and quantum field theory.

One of the goals of the program is mobility: every student admitted to the IRAP Ph.D. is part of a team at one of the consortium members, and each year visits the other centers to keep track of developments in the other fields. Within the IRAP Ph.D. program, students are systematically trained in the techniques of research management and in the nature and organization of scientific projects.

== The consortium ==
Since 2005 ICRANet has co-organized the IRAP Ph.D. program together with:

- AEI - Albert Einstein Institute - Potsdam (Germany)
- CBPF - Brazilian Center for Physics Research (Brazil)
- Indian Center for Space Physics (India)
- INPE (Instituto Nacional de Pesquisas Espaciais, Brazil)
- Institut Hautes Etudes Scientifiques - IHES (France)
- Côte d’Azur Observatory (France)
- Observatory of Shanghai (China)
- Observatory of Tartu (Estonia)
- University of Bremen (Germany)
- University of Oldenburg (Germany)
- University of Ferrara (Italy)
- University of Nice (France)
- University of Rome "La Sapienza" (Italy)
- University of Savoy (France)

== The faculty ==
As of 2015, the faculty of the IRAP Ph.D. program consists of:

Giovanni Amelino-Camelia	(Sapienza Università di Roma)
Stefano Ansoldi	(Università degli Studi di Udine)
Ulisses Barres de Almeida	(Brazilian Centre For Physics Research, Brazil)
Vladimir Belinski	(Sapienza Università di Roma and ICRANet)
Carlo Luciano Bianco	(Sapienza Università di Roma and ICRANet)
Donato Bini	(CNR - Ist. per Applicaz. del Calcolo "M. Picone")
Sandip Kumar Chakrabarti	(Indian Centre For Space Physics, India)
Pascal Chardonnet (Erasmus Mundus Coordinator)	(Université de Savoie)
Christian Cherubini	(Università "Campus Biomedico" di Roma)
Andreas Eckart	(University of Cologne)
Thibault Damour	(Institut des Hautes Etudes Scientifiques)
Jaan Einasto	(Tartu Observatory)
Sergio Frasca	(Sapienza Università di Roma)
Filippo Frontera	(Università di Ferrara)
Jean-Marc Gambaudo	(Université de Nice Sophia Antipolis)
Paolo Giommi	(ASI – Agenzia Spaziale Italiana)
Luis Herrera Cometta	(University of Salamanca)
Yipeng Jing	(Shanghai Astronomical Observatory, China)
Hagen Kleinert	(Freie Universitat Berlin)
Michael Kramer	(Max Planck Institute for Radio Astronomy)
Jutta Kunz-Drolshagen	(Carl von Ossietzky University of Oldenburg)
Luca Lamagna	(University of Sapienza)
Claus Lämmerzahl	(Universität Bremen)
Olivier Legrand	(Université de Nice Sophia Antipolis)
Francois Mignard	(Observatoire de la Côte d'Azur)
Hermann Nicolai	(Max Planck Institute for Gravitational Physics, Potsdam)
Kjell Rosquist	(Stockholm University)
Jorge Rueda (CAPES-ICRANet coordinator)	(Sapienza Università di Roma and ICRANet)
Remo Ruffini (Director)	(Sapienza Università di Roma and ICRANet)
Felix Ryde	(Stockholm University)
Farrokh Vakili	(Observatoire de la Côte d'Azur)
Gregory Vereshchagin	(Sapienza Università di Roma and ICRANet)
She Sheng Xue	(Sapienza Università di Roma and ICRANet)
Shuangnan Zhang	(Institute of High Energy Physics – Chinese Academy of Science)

== Erasmus Mundus Joint Doctorate (2010-2017) ==
Launched in 2004 under the Bologna Declaration, the Erasmus Mundus programs have supported academic cooperation and mobility with partner countries to form the joint European Higher Education Area. During 2010-2017 the IRAP Ph.D. has taken part in the Erasmus Mundus program of the European Commission and has enrolled 5 cycles of students with the total number of 44 students. The Nice University was the host organization.

== CAPES-ICRANet Program (2013-2018) ==
In 2013 CAPES and ICRANet have signed a Memorandum of Understanding regarding the establishment of the CAPES-ICRANet Program. Each year five fellowships for Brazilian students are granted. Each fellowship lasts for three years with the final Ph.D. degree jointly delivered by the academic institutions participating in the program.

== Schools and seminars ==
Within IRAP Ph.D. program ICRANet organizes Ph.D. schools. In particular 15 schools were held in Nice and Les Houches, France, within the EMJD program:

- February, 1–19, 2010 - Nice (France)
- March 22–26, 2010 - Ferrara (Italy)
- September, 6-24, 2010 - Nice (France)
- March 21–26, 2011 - Pescara (Italy)
- April 3–8, 2011 - Les Houches (France)
- May 25 - June 10, 2011 (France)
- September 5–17, 2011 (France)
- October 2–7, 2011 - Les Houches (France)
- October 12–16, 2011 - Beijing (China)
- September 3–21, 2012 - Nice (France)
- May 16–31, 2013 - Nice (France)
- September 2–20, 2013 - Nice (France)
- February 23 - March 2, 2014 - Nice (France)
- May 10–16, 2014 - Les Houches (France)
- September 8–19, 2014 - Nice (France)

ICRANet co-organizes a Joint Astrophysics Seminar at the Department of Physics of the University of Rome "La Sapienza" and ICRA in Rome. All institutions collaborating with ICRANet as well as the ICRANet centers participate in these seminars via video conferencing.

== Statistics ==
The official language of the program is English, but students have the opportunity to learn the language of their host country, following a variety of courses at the partner universities.

As of 2015, the IRAP-Ph.D. has seen the enrollment of 111 students: 1 from Albania, 3 from Argentina, 5 from Armenia, 1 from Austria, 2 from Belarus, 16 from Brazil, 5 from China, 9 from Colombia, 2 from Croatia, 5 from France, 5 from Germany, 7 from India, 2 from Iran, 34 from Italy, 2 from Kazakhstan, 1 from Mexico, 1 from Pakistan, 4 from Russia, 1 from Serbia, 1 from Sweden, 1 from Switzerland, 1 from Taiwan, 1 from Turkey, 1 from Ukraine.

During 2011–2015, more than 500 applications from 70 countries from all over the world were considered and 44 Ph.D. candidates were selected including roughly 30% female candidates.
