= ICRANet =

International astrophysics research organization

The International Center for Relativistic Astrophysics Network - ICRANet
- Type: International organization
- Established: 2005
- Director: Michele Punturo
- Location: Pescara, Italy
- Website: https://www.icranet.org

ICRANet, the International Center for Relativistic Astrophysics Network, is an international organization which promotes research activities in relativistic astrophysics and related areas. Its members are four countries and three Universities and Research Centers: Armenia, Italian Republic, the Vatican City State, the University of Arizona (USA), and ICRA.

ICRANet headquarters are located in Pescara, Italy.

== History of ICRANet foundation: ICRA and ICRANet ==
=== ICRA and ICRANet ===
In 1985, the International Center for Relativistic Astrophysics ICRA was founded by Remo Ruffini (University of Rome "La Sapienza") together with Riccardo Giacconi (Nobel Prize for Physics 2002), Abdus Salam (Nobel Prize for Physics 1979), Paul Boynton (University of Washington), George Coyne (former director of the Vatican observatory), Francis Everitt (Stanford University) and Fang Li-Zhi (University of Science and Technology of China).

The Statute and the Agreement establishing ICRANet were signed on March 19, 2003, and they were recognized in the same year by the Republic of Armenia and the Vatican City State. ICRANet has been created in 2005 by a law of the Italian Government, ratified by the Italian Parliament and signed by the President of the Italian Republic Carlo Azeglio Ciampi on February 10, 2005. The Republic of Armenia, Italian Republic, the Vatican City State, ICRA, the University of Arizona and the Stanford University are the founding members.

On September 12, 2005, ICRANet Steering Committee was established and had its first meeting: Remo Ruffini and Fang Li-Zhi were appointed respectively Director and Chairman of the Steering Committee. On December 19, 2006, ICRANet Scientific Committee was established and had its first meeting in Washington DC. Riccardo Giacconi was appointed chairman and John Mester Co-chairman.

On September 21, 2005, the Director of ICRANet signed, together with the then Ambassador of Brazil in Rome Dante Coelho De Lima the adhesion of the Federative Republic of Brazil to ICRANet. The entrance of Brazil, requested by the then President of Brazil Luiz Inácio Lula da Silva has been unanimously ratified by the Brazilian Parliament. On August 12, 2011, the then President of Brazil Dilma Rousseff signed the entrance of Brazil in ICRANet.

=== Marcel Grossmann meetings ===
By the beginning of the twentieth century the new branch of mathematics, tensor calculus, was developed in the works of Gregorio Ricci Curbastro and Tullio Levi Civita of the University of Padua and the University of Rome "La Sapienza". Marcel Grossmann of the University of Zurich who had a deep knowledge of the Italian school of geometry and who was close to Einstein introduced to him these concepts. The collaboration between Einstein and Grossmann was essential for the development of General Relativity.

Remo Ruffini and Abdus Salam in 1975 established the Marcel Grossmann meetings (MG) on Recent Developments in Theoretical and Experimental General Relativity, Gravitation, and Relativistic Field Theories, which take place every three years in different countries, gathering more than 1000 researchers. MG1 and MG2 were held in 1975 and in 1979 in Trieste; MG3 in 1982 in Shanghai; MG4 in 1985 in Rome; MG5 in 1988 in Perth; MG6 in 1991 in Kyoto; MG7 in 1994 at Stanford; MG8 in 1997 in Jerusalem; MG9 in 2000 in Rome; MG10 in 2003 in Rio de Janeiro; MG11 in 2006 in Berlin; MG12 in 2009 in Paris; MG13 in 2012 in Stockholm; MG14 in 2015 and MG15 in 2018 both in Rome. Since its foundation, ICRANet has always played a leading role in the organization of those meetings.

=== Celebration of the International Year of Astronomy 2009 ===
ICRANet has been Organizational Associate of the International Year of Astronomy 2009 and supported the global coordination of IYA2009 financially. In this occasion ICRANet organized a series of international meetings under the general title "The Sun, the Star, the Universe and General Relativity" including: the 1st Zeldovich meeting (Minsk, Belarus), the Sobral Meeting (Fortaleza, Brazil), the 1st Galileo - Xu Guangqi meeting (Shanghai, China), the 11th Italian-Korean Symposium on Relativistic Astrophysics (Seoul, South Korea) and the 5th Australasian Conference - Christchurch Meeting (Christchurch, New Zealand).

=== Celebration of the International Year of Light 2015 ===
Under the initiative of the United Nations and UNESCO, 2015 was declared the International Year of Light, and it represented the centenary of the formulation of the equations of general relativity by Albert Einstein, and the fiftieth anniversary of the birth of relativistic astrophysics. ICRANet was a "Bronze Associate" sponsor of those celebrations.

In 2015, ICRANet also organized a series of international meetings including: the Second ICRANet César Lattes Meeting (Niterói – Rio de Janeiro – João Pessoa – Recife – Fortaleza, Brazil), the International Conference on Gravitation and Cosmology / the 4th Galileo-Xu Guangqi meeting (Beijing, China), Fourteenth Marcel Grossmann Meeting - MG14 (Rome, Italy), the 1st ICRANet Julio Garavito Meeting on Relativistic Astrophysics (Bucaramanga – Bogotá, Colombia), the 1st Sandoval Vallarta Caribbean Meeting on Relativistic Astrophysics (Mexico City, Mexico).

== Organization and structure ==
The organization consists of the Director, the Steering Committee and the Scientific Committee. The members of committees are representatives of the countries and member institutions. ICRANet has a number of permanent Faculty positions. Their activities are supported by administrative staff and secretariat personnel. ICRANet financing is based by Statute on the funds provided by the governments and by voluntary contributions, donations.

The initial Director of ICRANet appointed in 1985 was Remo Ruffini. Ruffini remains Director as of 2026.

The current Director is Michele Punturo.

In 2023 the Steering Committee consists of:

- Albania: Elida Bylyku
- Armenia: Nouneh Zastoukhova
- ICRA: Yu Wang
- Italy:
  1. Italian Foreign Ministry, Unità Scientifica e Tecnologica Bilaterale e Multilaterale: Amb. Lorenzo Angeloni, Cons. Alessandro Garbellini,
  2. Ministry of Economy and Finance, Ragioneria Generale dello Stato, IGAE, Uff. IX: Dr. Antonio Bartolini, Dr. Salvatore Sebastiano Vizzini
  3. MIUR: Dr. Vincenzo Di Felice, Dott.ssa Giulietta Iorio
  4. Pescara Municipality: Avv. Carlo Masci
- Stanford University: Francis Everitt
- University of Arizona: Xiaohui Fan
- Vatican City State: Guy J. Consolmagno, S.J.

The current Chairperson (2019) of the ICRANet Steering Committee is Francis Everitt.

The first Chairperson of the Scientific Committee was Riccardo Giacconi, Nobel Prize for Physics in 2002, who ended his term in 2013. The current (2019) Chairperson of the Scientific Committee is Massimo Della Valle.

The Scientific Committee in 2019 consists of: Prof. Narek Sahakyan (Armenia), Dr. Barres de Almeida Ulisses (Brazil), Dr. Carlo Luciano Bianco (ICRA), Prof. Massimo Della Valle (Italy), Prof. John Mester (Stanford University), Prof. Chris Fryer (University of Arizona) and Dr. Gabriele Gionti (Vatican City State).

The Faculty in 2019 consists of Professors Ulisses Barres de Almeida, Vladimir Belinski, Carlo Luciano Bianco, Donato Bini, Pascal Chardonnet, Christian Cherubini, Filippi Simonetta, Robert Jantzen, Roy Patrick Kerr, Hans Ohanian, Giovanni Pisani, Brian Mathew Punsly, Jorge Rueda, Remo Ruffini, Gregory Vereshchagin, and She-Sheng Xue, and is supported by an Adjunct Faculty made up of more than 30 internationally renowned scientists participating in ICRANet activities, and between eighty "Lecturers" and "Visiting Professors". Among these are the Nobel Laureates Murray Gell-Mann, Theodor Hänsch, Gerard 't Hooft and Steven Weinberg.

== Member states and institutions ==
Currently ICRANet members are four countries and three Universities and research centers.

Member states:

Country	Date joined
Armenia	2003
Federal Republic of Brazil	2011
Italian Republic	2003
Vatican City State	2003

Member institutions:

Institution	Date joined
University of Arizona (USA)	2003
Stanford University (USA)	2003
ICRA	2003

ICRANet has signed collaboration agreements with over 60 institutions, universities and research centers in different countries.

== ICRANet seats and centers ==
The network is composed of several seats and centers. Seat agreements, establishing rights and privileges, including extraterritoriality, have been signed for the seat in Pescara in Italy, for the seat in Rio de Janeiro in Brazil and for the seat in Yerevan in Armenia. The Seat Agreement for Pescara has been ratified on May 13, 2010. The Seat agreement for Yerevan has been unanimously approved by the Parliament of Armenia on November 13, 2015.

High-speed optical fiber connection with different locations are made possible by the connection to the pan-European data network for the research and education community (GÉANT) through the GARR network.

Currently ICRANet centers are operative at:

- ICRANet Headquarters in Pescara, Italy
- The Department of Physics of university "La Sapienza" (Rome, Italy);
- Villa Ratti (Nice, France);
- The Presidium of the Armenian National Academy of Sciences (Yerevan, Armenia);
- CBPF – Centro Brasileiro de Pesquisas Físicas (Rio de Janeiro, Brazil);
- Isfahan University of Technology (Isfahan, Iran);
- National Academy of Science of Belarus (Minsk, Belarus).

=== ICRANet Centers in Pescara, Rome and Nice ===
ICRANet headquarters are located in Pescara, Italy. This center coordinates ICRANet activities and yearly meetings of the Scientific and the Steering committees are usually held there. International meetings such as the Italian-Korean Symposia on Relativistic Astrophysics are regularly held in this center. Scientific activities in Pescara center include the fundamental research on early cosmology by the Russian school guided by Vladimir Belinski.

Activities of the ICRANet Seat at Villa Ratti in Nice include the coordination of the IRAP PhD program, as well as scientific activities connected with the ultra high energy observations by the University of Savoy and the VLT observations performed by the Côte d'Azur Observatory, which involve the thesis works of IRAP PhD students. The University of Savoy is the closest French lab to the CERN.

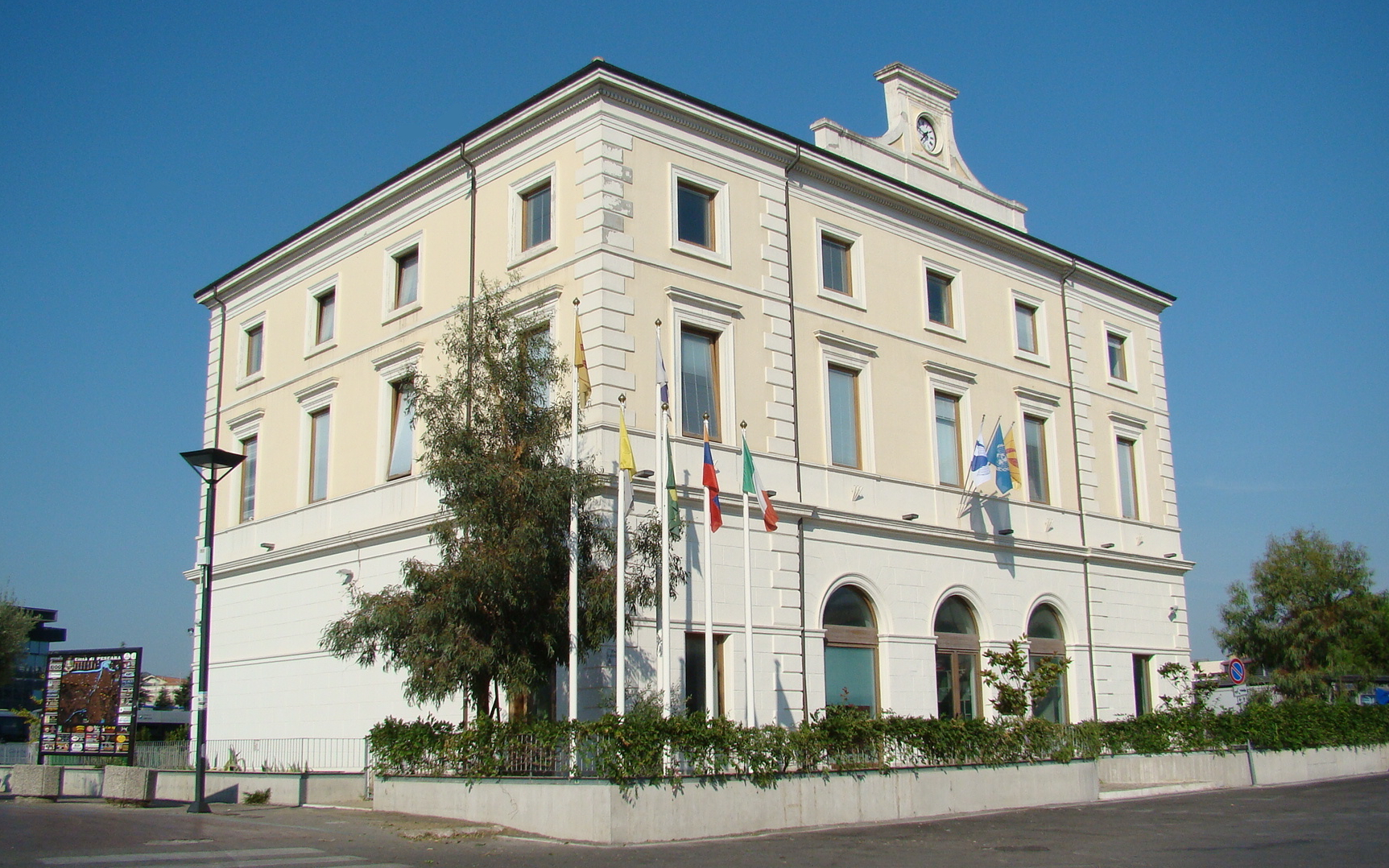
ICRANet Headquarters in Pescara (Italy).

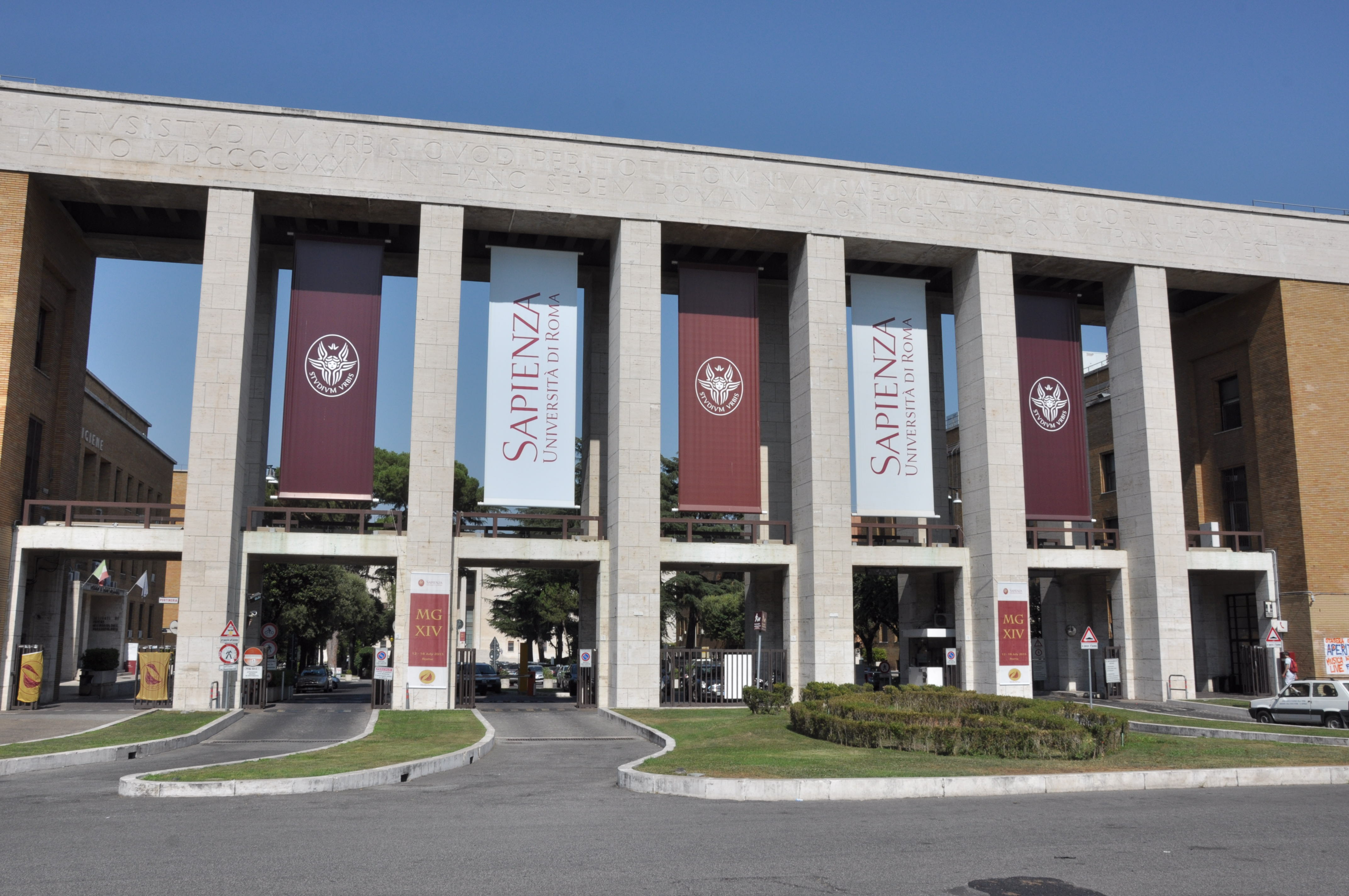
The University of Rome "La Sapienza" where the Physics Department hosts ICRANet center in Rome (Italy).

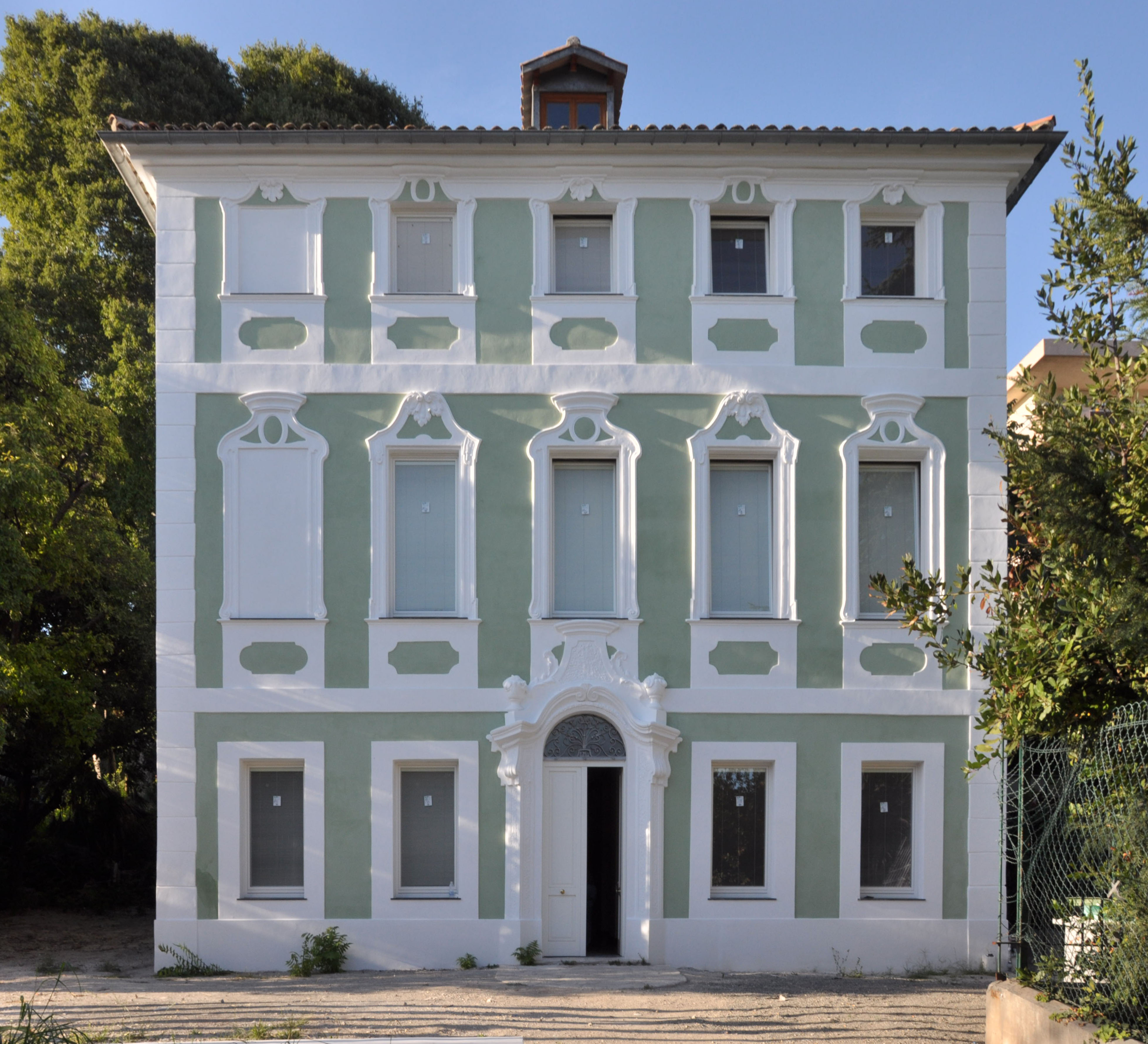
ICRANet seat in Nice (France).

=== ICRANet Center in Armenia ===
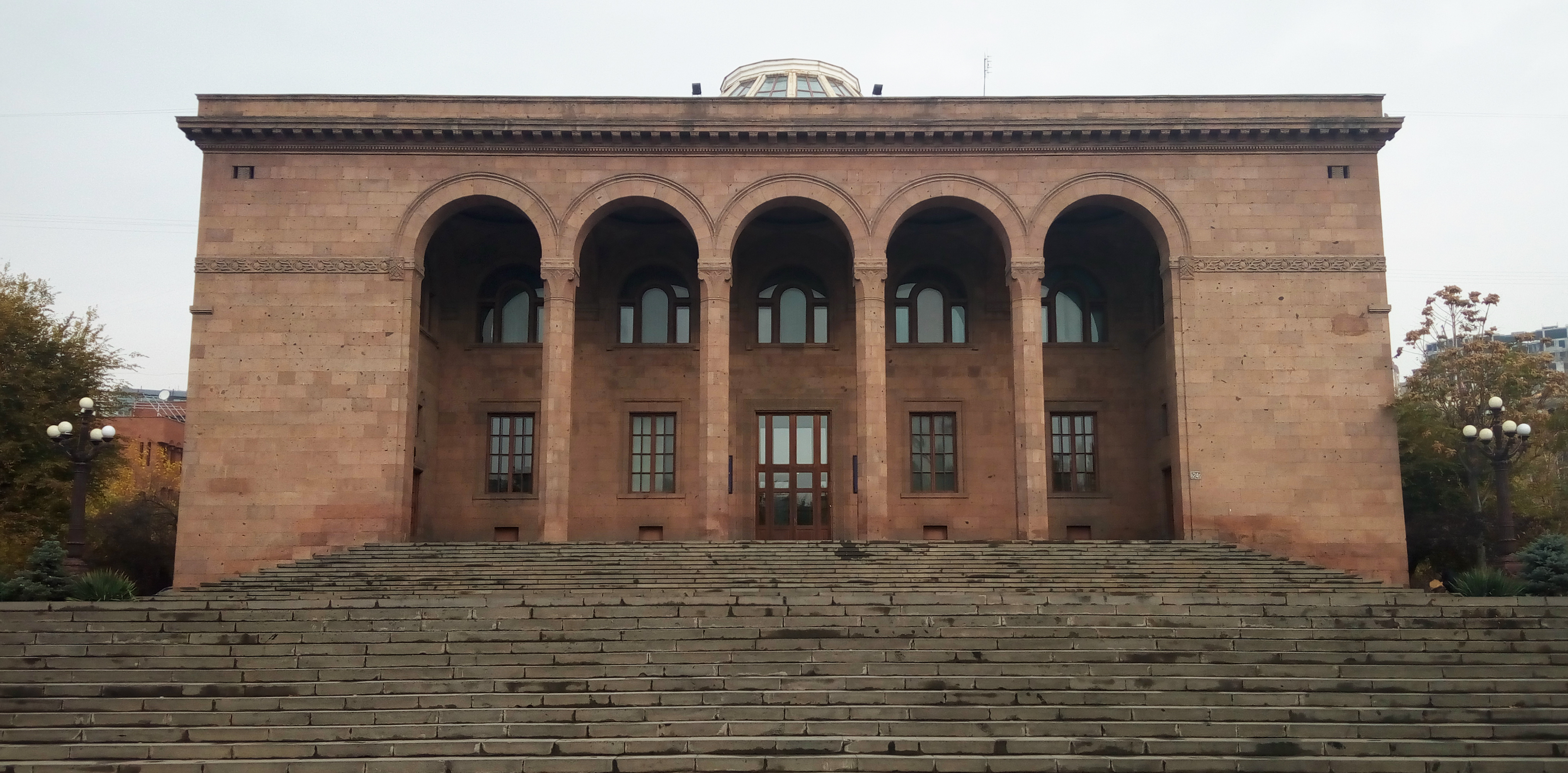
The Presidium of the National Academy of Sciences of Armenia, where ICRANet seat in Yerevan (Armenia) is located.

Since January 2014, the ICRANet Center in Yerevan has been established at the Presidium of the National Academy of Sciences of Armenia, at Marshall Baghramian Avenue, 24a. Scientific activities in this center are coordinated by the Director, Dr. Narek Sahakyan. In 2014, the Government of Armenia approved the Agreement to establish the ICRANet international center in Armenia. The Seat Agreement has been signed in Rome on February 14, 2015, by the director of ICRANet, Remo Ruffini and the Ambassador of Armenia in Italy, Mr. Sargis Ghazaryan. On November 13, 2015, the Parliament of Armenia unanimously approved the Seat Agreement. Since January 2016 ICRANet Armenia center is registered at the Ministry of Foreign Affairs as an international organization. The main areas of scientific research in ICRANet-Armenia are in the fields of relativistic astrophysics, astroparticle physics, X-ray astrophysics, high and very high energy gamma-ray astrophysics, high energy neutrino astrophysics. The center is a full member of the MAGIC international collaboration since 2017. Also, the center is actively involved in development of the Open Universe Initiative. In Armenia, the ICRANet center collaborates with other scientific institutions from the academy and Universities, and provides to organize joint international meetings and workshops, summer schools for PhD students and mobility programs for scientists in the field of Astrophysics. ICRANet center in Armenia coordinates ICRANet activities in the area of Central-Asian and Middle-Eastern countries.

A summer school and an international scientific conference dedicated to the issues of Relativistic Astrophysics "1st Scientific ICRANet Meeting in Armenia: Black Holes: the largest energy sources in the Universe" were held in Armenia from June 28 to July 4, 2014.

=== ICRANet Center in Brazil ===
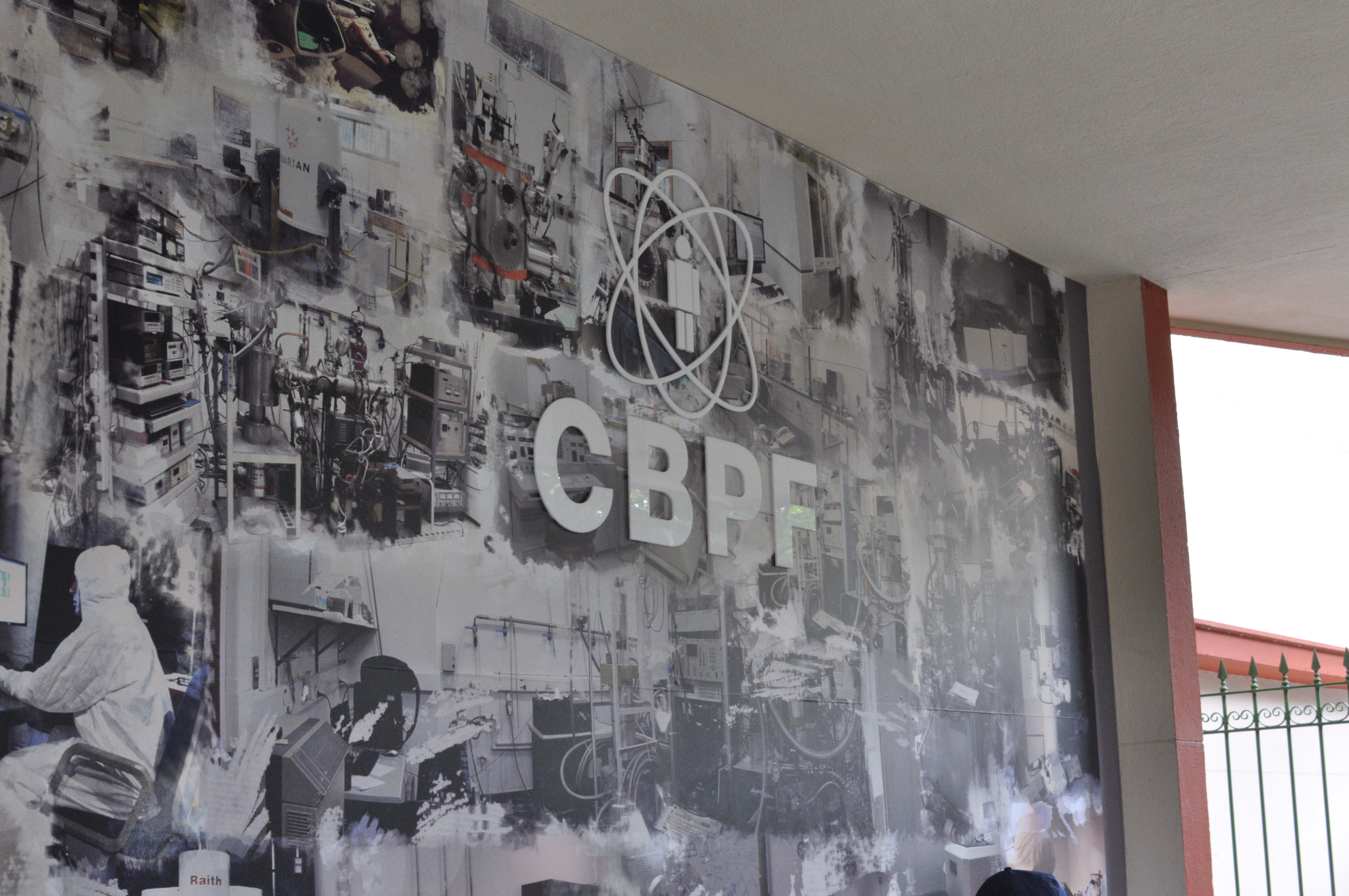
Entrance of CBPF, where ICRANet seat in Rio de Janeiro is located.

The Seat of ICRANet in Rio de Janeiro has been established initially on the premises granted by CBPF, with the possible expansion to the Cassino da Urca. A school of Cosmology and Astrophysics is being developed jointly with Brazilian institutions. The 2nd ICRANet César Lattes Meeting devoted to relativistic astrophysics was held in Rio de Janeiro in 2015.

Currently (2019) ICRANet has signed scientific collaboration agreements with 17 Brazilian universities, institutions and research centers.

There are two specific programs initiated by ICRANet, which are underway:

- the possibility of restructuring the mountain side of the Cassino da Urca as the Seat of ICRANet for Brazil and Latin America (with a project by the Italian Architect Carlo Serafini),
- building of the Brazilian Science Data Center (BSDC), a novel astrophysics data base, built following the concept of the ASI Science Data Center (ASDC) by the Italian Space Agency, which will consist on a unique research infrastructure at the interface between experimental and theoretical astrophysicists.

=== ICRANet Center in Minsk ===
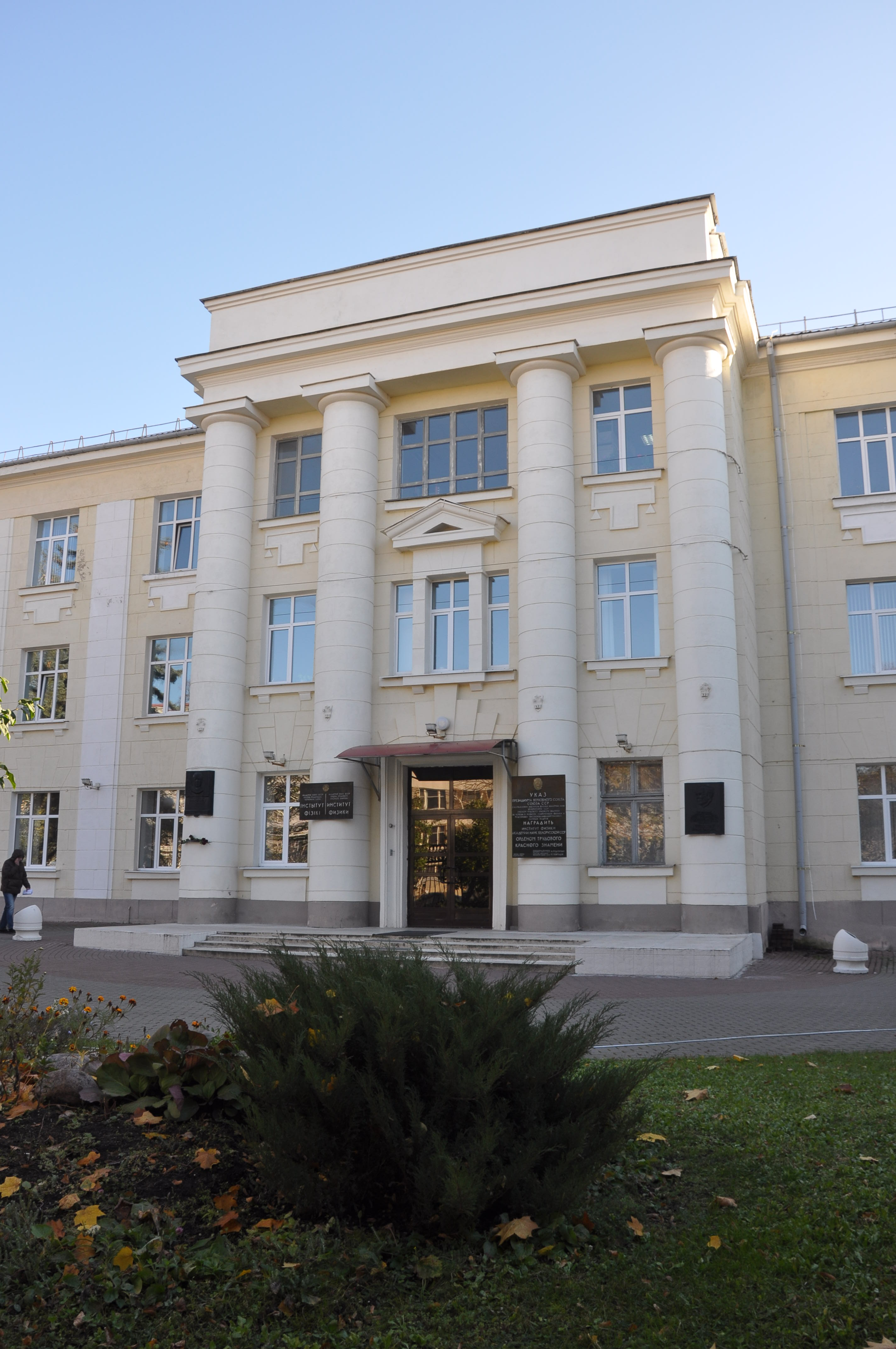
The entrance of the Institute of Physics of the National Academy of Science of Belarus, where ICRANet-Minsk center is located.

The ICRANet-Minsk center has been established at the National Academy of Science of Belarus (NASB), with whom ICRANet has signed a cooperation agreement on 2013. The Protocol for the opening of the ICRANet-Minsk center has been signed in April 2016. The "First ICRANet-Minsk workshop on high energy astrophysics" has been held at the ICRANet-Minsk center from 26 to 28 of April 2017.

=== ICRANet Center in Isfahan ===
The ICRANet Center in Isfahan has been established at the Isfahan University of Technology. The Protocol of cooperation, signed in 2016 by Remo Ruffini, Director of ICRANet, and Mahnoud Modarres-Hashemi, Rector of the Isfahan University of Technology, includes the promotion and development of scientific and technological research in the fields of cosmology, gravitation and relativistic astrophysics. It also includes the organization of joint international conferences and workshops, institutional exchanges for students, researchers and faculty members.

=== ICRANet Centers in USA ===
The present Chairman of the ICRANet Steering Committee Francis Everitt is responsible for the ICRANet Center at the Leland Stanford Junior University. His notable activity has been the conception, development, launch, data acquisition, and elaboration of the final data analysis of the NASA Gravity Probe B mission, one of the most complex physics experiments ever performed in space.

The first Chairman of the ICRANet Steering Committee Fang Li-Zhi developed the collaboration with the Physics Department of the University of Arizona in Tucson. The collaboration with its Astronomy Department is promoted by David Arnett.

== ICRANet and IRAP PhD program ==
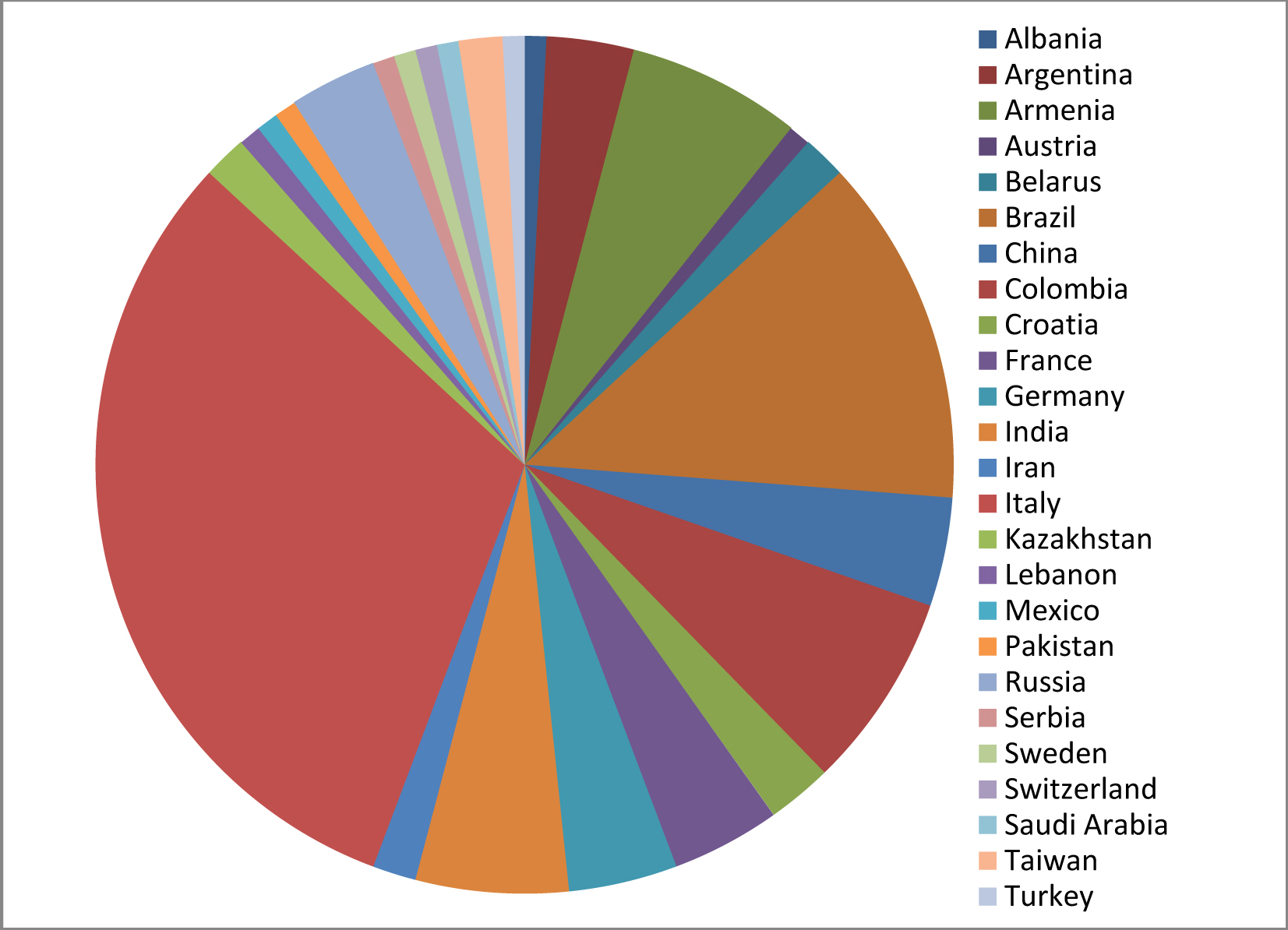
Geographical distribution of IRAP PhD students.

Since 2005 ICRANet co-organizes an International Ph.D. program in Relativistic Astrophysics — International Relativistic Astrophysics Ph.D. Program, IRAP-PhD, the first joint PhD astrophysics program with: ASI - Italian Space Agency (Italy); Bremen University (Germany); Carl von Ossietzky University of Oldenburg (Germany); CAPES - Brazilian Federal Agency for Support and Evaluation of Graduate Education (Brazil); CBPF - Brazilian Centre for Physics Research (Brazil); CNR - National Research Council (Italy); FAPERJ -Foundation "Carlos Chagas Filho de Amparo à Pesquisa do Estado do Rio de Janeiro" (Brazil); ICRA - International Center for Relativistic Astrophysics (Italy); ICTP - Abdus Salam International Centre for Theoretical Physics (Italy); IHES - Institut Hautes Etudes Scientifiques (France); Indian centre for space physics (India); INFN - National Institute for Nuclear Physics (Italy); NAS RA - Armenian National Academy of Sciences (Armenia); Nice University Sophia Antipolis (France); Observatory of the Côte d'Azur (France); Rome University - "Sapienza" (Italy); Savoy University (France); TWAS - Academy of sciences for the developing world; UAM - Metropolitan Autonomous University (Mexico); UNIFE - University of Ferrara (Italy). Among the associated centers, there are both institutes devoted to theory and others devoted to experiments and observations. In that way, PhD students can have a wider education on theoretical relativistic astrophysics and put it in practice. The official language of the IRAP PhD is English and students have also the opportunity to learn the national language of their hosting country, attending several academic courses in the partner Universities.

By 2019, 122 students were enrolled in the IRAP PhD program: 1 from Albania, 4 from Argentina, 8 from Armenia, 1 from Austria, 2 from Belarus, 16 from Brazil, 5 from China, 9 from Colombia, 3 from Croatia, 5 from France, 5 from Germany 7 from India, 2 from Iran, 38 from Italy 2 from Kazakhstan, 1 from Lebanon, 1 from Mexico, 1 from Pakistan, 4 from Russia, 1 from Serbia, 1 from Sweden, 1 from Switzerland, 1 from Saudi Arabia, 2 from Taiwan and 1 from Turkey.

The IRAP-PhD program was the only European PhD program in Astrophysics awarded the Erasmus Mundus label and funded by the European Commission in 2010–2017.

== Scientific research at ICRANet ==
ICRANet main goals are training, education and research in the field of relativistic astrophysics, cosmology, theoretical physics and mathematical physics.

Its main activities are devoted to promote the international scientific co-operation and to carry on scientific research.

According to the 2018 ICRANet Scientific Report, the main areas of scientific research in ICRANet are:

- High Energy Gamma-rays from Active Galactic Nuclei
- The ICRANet Brazilian Science Data Center (BSDC) and Multi-frequency selection and studies of blazars;
- Exact solutions of Einstein and Einstein-Maxwell equations;
- Gamma-Ray Bursts;
- Theoretical Astroparticle Physics;
- Generalization of the Kerr-Newman solution;
- Black Holes and Quasars;
- The electron-positron pairs in physics and astrophysics;
- From nuclei to compact stars;
- Supernovae;
- Symmetries in General Relativity;
- Self Gravitating Systems, Galactic Structures and Galactic Dynamics;
- Interdisciplinary Complex Systems.

Between 2006 and 2019, ICRANet has released over 1800 scientific publications in refereed journals such as Physical Review, the Astrophysical Journal, Astronomy and Astrophysics etc., in its various fields of research.

New scientific concepts and terms introduced by ICRANet scientists:

Black hole (Ruffini, Wheeler 1971)

Ergosphere (Rees, Ruffini, Wheeler, 1974)

Pursue and plunge (Rees, Ruffini, Wheeler, 1974)

Black hole mass formula (Christodoulou, Ruffini, 1971)

Reversible and irreversible transformations of black holes (Christodoulou, Ruffini, 1971)

Dyadosphere (Damour, Ruffini, 1975; Preparata, Ruffini, Xue, 1998)

Dyadotorus (Cherubini et al., 2009)

Induced Gravitational Collapse (Rueda, Ruffini, 2012)

Binary-driven Hypernova (Ruffini et al., 2014)

Cosmic matrix (Ruffini et al., 2015)

== Other activities ==
=== International meetings ===
The Galileo-Xu Guangqi meetings (2009-)

The Galileo-Xu Guangqi meetings have been created in the name of Galileo and Xu Guangqi, the collaborator of Matteo Ricci (Ri Ma Dou), generally recognized for bringing to China the works of Euclid and Galileo and for his strong commitment to the process of modernization and scientific development of China. The 1st Galileo - Xu Guangqi Meeting was held in Shanghai, China, in 2009. The 2nd Galileo - Xu Guangqi meeting took place in Hanbury Botanic Gardens (Ventimiglia, Italy) and Villa Ratti (Nice, France) in 2010. The 3rd and 4th Galileo - Xu Guangqi meetings were both held in Beijing, China, respectively in 2011 and 2015.

Italian-Korean Symposia (1987-)

The Italian-Korean Symposia on Relativistic Astrophysics is a series of biannual meetings, alternatively organized in Italy and in Korea since 1987. The symposia discussions cover topics in astrophysics and cosmology, such as gamma-ray bursts and compact stars, high energy cosmic rays, dark energy and dark matter, general relativity, black holes, and new physics related to cosmology.

Stueckelberg Workshops on Relativistic Field Theories (2006–2008)

These workshops represent a one-week dialogues on Relativistic Field Theories in Curved Space, which is inspired to the work of E. C. G. Stueckelberg. Invited lectures were delivered by Professors Abhay Ashtekar, Thomas Thiemann, Gerard 't Hooft and Hagen Kleinert.

The Zeldovich Meetings (2009-)

The Zeldovich Meetings are a series of international conferences held in Minsk, in honor of Ya. B. Zeldovich, one of the fathers of the Soviet Atomic Bomb and the founder of the Russian School on Relativistic Astrophysics, which celebrate and discuss his wide research interests, ranging from chemical physics, elementary particle and nuclear physics to astrophysics and cosmology. The 1st Zeldovich Meeting was held at the Belarusian State University in Minsk, from 20 to 23 April 2009; the 2nd Zeldovich Meeting was held at the National Academy of Sciences of Belarus from 10 to 14 March 2014, to celebrate Ya. B. Zeldovich 100th Anniversary; the 3rd Zeldovich Meeting has been held at the National Academy of Sciences of Belarus from 23 to 27 April 2018.

Other meetings

ICRANet has also organized:

- six Italian-Sino Workshops on Cosmology and Relativistic Astrophysics, held in Pescara every year from 2004 to 2009, except for the 5th Italian-Sino Workshop held in Taipei-Hualien, Taiwan, in 2008;
- two ICRANet Cesar Latter meetings (in 2007 and 2015) and the 1st URCA meeting on Relativistic Astrophysics in Rio de Janeiro, Brazil.

=== PhD schools ===
In the framework of the IRAP PhD program, ICRANet has organized several PhD schools: 11 of them have been held in Nice (France), 3 in Les Houches, 1 in Ferrara (Italy), 1 in Pescara (Italy) and 1 in Beijing (China).

=== ICRANet visiting program ===
ICRANet has developed a program of short and long term visits for scientific collaboration.

Prominent personalities have carried out their activities at ICRA and ICRANet, among them are: Prof. Riccardo Giacconi, Nobel Prize for Physics in 2002, Gerardus 't Hooft, Dutch physicist and Nobel Prize for Physics in 1999; Steven Weinberg, Nobel Prize in 1979; Murray Gell -Mann Nobel Prize in 1969; Subrahmanyan Chandrasekhar Nobel Prize in 1930; Haensch Theodor, Nobel Prize in 2001; Valeriy Ginzburg., Francis Everitt, Chairman of the Scientific Committee of ICRANet, Isaak Khalatnikov, Russian physicist and former director of the Landau Institute for Theoretical Physics from 1965 to 1992; Roy Kerr, New Zealand mathematician and discoverer of the "Kerr Metric"; Thibault Damour; Demetrios Christodoulou; Hagen Kleinert; Neta and John Bachall; Tsvi Piran; Charles Misner; Robert Williams; José Gabriel Funes; Fang Li-Zhi; Rashid Sunyaev.

=== Weekly seminars ===
ICRANet co-organizes with ICRA Joint Astrophysics Seminar at the Department of Physics of university "La Sapienza" in Rome. All institutions collaborating with ICRANet, as well as ICRANet centers, participate at those seminars.

=== Brazilian Science Data Center ===
The main objective of the Brazilian Science Data Center (BSDC) is to provide data of all international space missions existing on the wavelength of X- and gamma rays, and later on the whole electromagnetic spectrum, for all the galactic and extragalactic sources of the Universe. A special attention will be paid to the achievement and the complete respect of the levels defined by the International Virtual Observatory Alliance (IVOA). In addition to these specific objectives, BSDC will promote technical seminars, annual workshops and it will assure a plan of scientific divulgation and popularization of science with the aim of the understanding of the Universe.

The BSDC is currently being implemented at CBPF, and at the Universidade Federal do Rio Grande do Sul (UFRGS), and will be expanded to all other ICRANet centers in Brazil as well as to the other Latin-American ICRANet Centers in Argentina, Colombia and Mexico: a unique coordinated continental research network planned for Latin America.
