= Filippo Frontera =

Italian astrophysicist (born 1941)

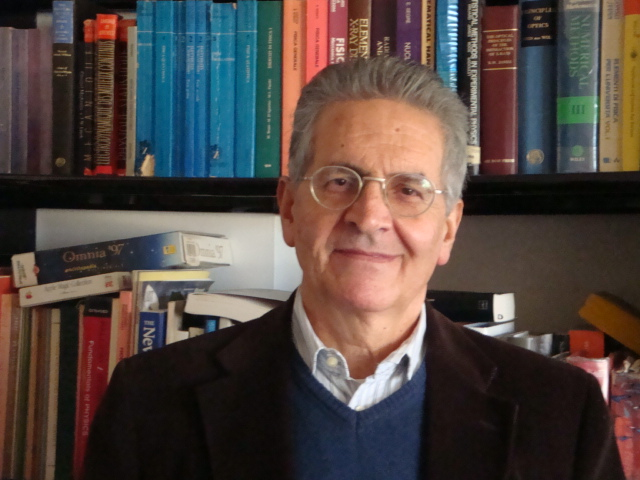
Filippo Frontera in 2012.

Filippo Frontera (Savelli, 16 November 1941) is an Italian astrophysicist and professor, who deals with astronomical investigations on celestial gamma-rays.

== Biography ==
=== Education and career ===
"Laurea" degree in physics with laude in 1966 at the Università di Bologna. Full professor of Experimental Physics of the University of Ferrara, Engineering Faculty, Ferrara, Italy, retired in 2012, for eight years Filippo Frontera was coordinator of the PhD course in Physics of this university. Previously, from 1969 to 1985, he was a scientist of the IASF-CNR institute (now OAS-INAF) in Bologna. As "Distinguished Scientist" of the University of Ferrara, he is continuing his research activity at the Physics and Earth Sciences Department, and is lecturer of "Measurements and Observations of celestial X-rays and gamma-rays" for the Master course in Physics. He is also associated scientist of the National Institute of Astrophysics (INAF) in Bologna. He is also adjunct professor of the International Center of Relativistic Astrophysics Network (ICRANET) and is a Faculty member of the international IRAP-PhD doctorate.

=== Scientific contributions ===
Since his "Laurea", he carried out his scientific activity in the field of the hard X-ray astronomy. He was Principal Investigator (PI) of many successful balloon experiments, launched from Italy, France, US and Australia. Among the most relevant results obtained, the first evidence of Quasi Periodic Oscillations from a black hole candidate, discovery that was confirmed about 20 years later with the CGRO NASA satellite mission. He was also PI of two experiments on board the BeppoSAX satellite launched on 30 April 1996 from Cape Canaveral, Florida (USA): the high energy telescope (15-300 keV) PDS (Phoswich Detection System) and the "Gamma-Ray Burst Monitor" (GRBM), with many relevant results from both of them. Concerning the GRBM, it had a fundamental role, along with the Wide Field Cameras also on board of BeppoSAX, for the discovery, occurred in 1997, of the extragalactic origin of Gamma Ray Bursts (GRBs), a mystery about 30 years old. This discovery was classified by the American journal Science among the top ten most important discoveries of the 1997 in all science fields. During the life time of BeppoSAX (30 April 1996 – 30 April 2002), the GRBM detected more than thousand GRBs, and allowed many other discoveries, among them, the so-called "Amati relation" from the name of the first author, of great importance for GRB physics and the first association of a GRB (980425) with a supernova explosion (SN1998bw). Thanks to the BeppoSAX discovery of their extragalactic origin, GRBs are now recognized to be an ideal laboratory for settling several still open issues in cosmology and fundamental physics.

Frontera was also co-investigator of the JEM-X experiment on board the INTEGRAL satellite with the realization of the field collimator and the ground calibration of the experiment at the X-ray facility LARIX designed and developed under the Frontera responsibility. LARIX, now extended and upgraded, is a trans-national facility of the European program AHEAD.

Frontera collaborated to the design and, at LARIX facility, to the calibration of the high energy X-ray experiment (HE) aboard the Chinese satellite Insight-HXMT developed at the Institute of High Energy Physics (IHEP) (PI Shuang-Nan Zhang), successfully launched on 15 June 2017 from the Chinese launch base of Jiuquan in the Gobi Desert. The collaboration with IHEP is continuing with the scientific exploitation of this satellite observations.

=== Technological innovations ===
In collaboration with INFN section of Ferrara and IASF-INAF (now OAS-INAF) of Bologna, Frontera led the development of the first Laue lens prototype to focus high energy X-rays. The mounting technique of such lens is the subject of an Italian Space Agency (ASI)-University of Ferrara patent. The development of Laue lenses for astrophysical applications is continuing and a new concept of Laue lens is the key instrument of a mission concept, ASTENA, proposed for the ESA long-term program “Voyage 2050".

== Publications ==
He is author of more than 360 papers published in international refereed journals, among which Nature and Science and about 200 publications in Proceedings of international symposia, with more than 850 titles in the NASA ADS (Astrophysics Data System) archive, inclusive of Circulars, and Telegrams.

For the high citation rate (currently more than 22,000), in 2007 he was included among the "Highly cited researchers" by ISI-Thomson from Philadelphia (USA).

== Memberships ==
Frontera is an emeritus member of the American Astronomical Society, member of the Italian Physical Society (SIF), of the Italian Society of General Relativity and Gravitation (SIGRAV) and of the Ferrara Academy of Sciences.

He is also member of the "Gruppo 2003 for the Scientific Research", an Association made of only Italian highly cited scientists.

== Awards ==
- In 1998, along with the research team of the Beppo-SAX satellite, Frontera was awarded the Bruno Rossi prize of the American Astronomical Society "for the prompt discovery and accurate localization of the X-ray counterpart of Gamma Ray Bursts, thus making possible their extragalactic origin".
- For the same discovery, in 2002, along with the research group represented by the astrophysicist Ed van den Heuvel, he was awarded the Descartes prize for "solving the gamma ray burst riddle".
- In 2010, Frontera along with Enrico Costa, one of his two deputy PIs for the BeppoSAX/PDS and GRBM experiments, was awarded the SIF Enrico Fermi prize, of the Italian Physical Society, for “the discovery of the afterglow, i.e., of the X-ray luminescence, from Gamma Ray Bursts”.
- In 2012, Frontera received the Marcel Grossmann Award "for guiding the Gamma-ray Burst Monitor project on board the Beppo-SAX satellite which led to the discovery of the GRB X-ray afterglows, and to their optical identification".
- In 2024, Frontera received the Insight-HXMT International collaboration Award, “in recognition of Outstanding Contributions to the Insight-HXMT Mission”.
- In 2024, in honor of Frontera, the asteroid of the main belt, 2002 AP12, was named 126177 Filippofrontera.

== Honours ==
Commander of the Order of Merit of the Italian Republic

"Initiative of President of Italy" — Rome, 13 February 2014

== See also ==
- University of Ferrara
- Beppo-SAX
- Bruno Rossi Prize
- Enrico Fermi Prize (SIF)
- Marcel Grossmann Award
- ICRANet
- INAF
