= Sachiko Tsuruta =

Astrophysicist

- Education: Columbia University
- Scientific career
- Thesis: Neutron star models (1964)

Sachiko Tsuruta is a Japanese-born American astrophysicist.

== Education ==
Tsuruta received a bachelor's degree from the University of Washington in 1956. She subsequently went on to Columbia University where she earned a master's degree in 1959 and a doctorate in 1964. While at Columbia she worked with Hong-Yee Chiu and Alastair G. W. Cameron at the NASA Goddard Institute for Space Studies.

== Career ==
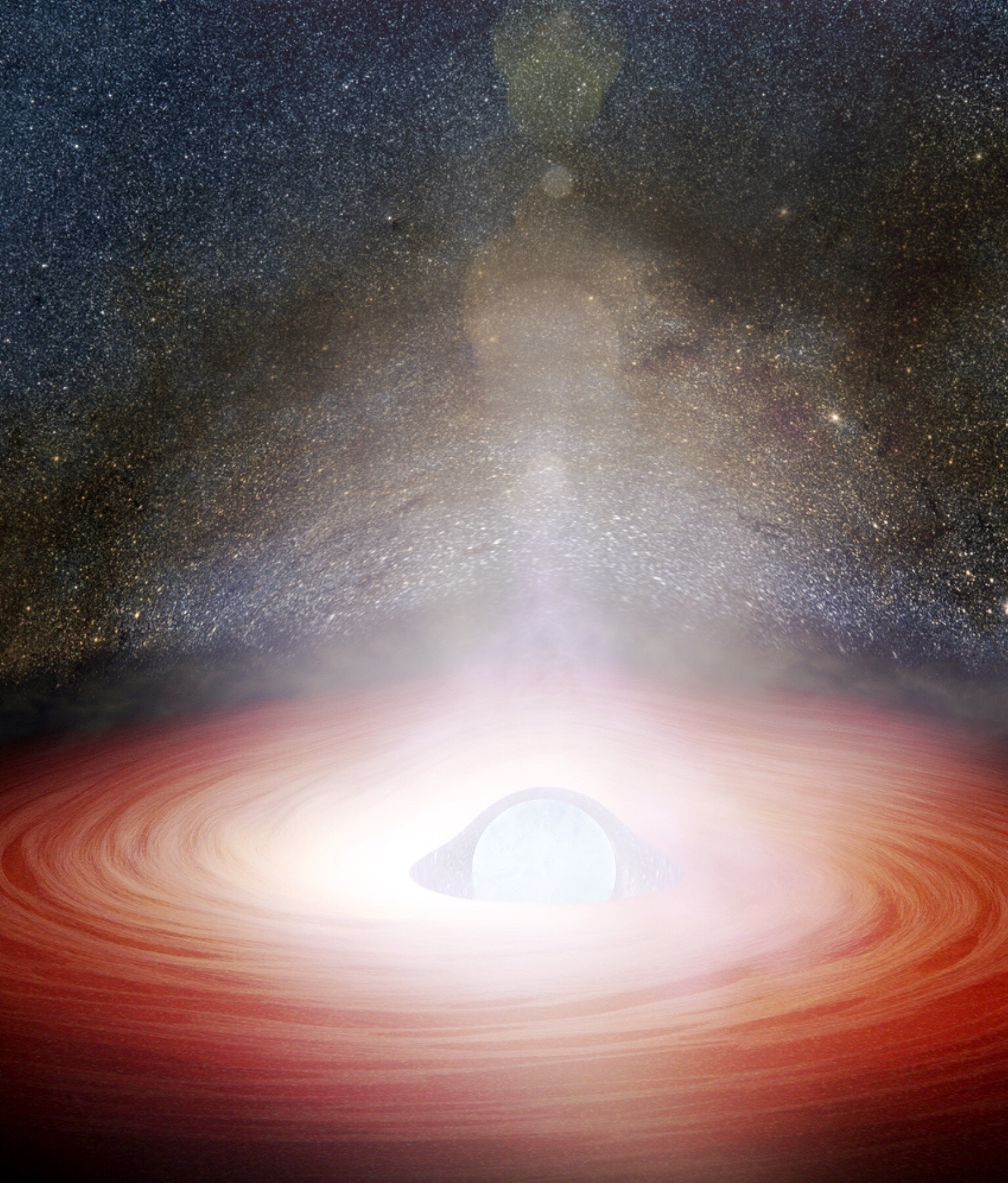
Simulated view of a neutron star with accretion disk. The disk appears distorted near the star due to extreme gravitational lensing.

After obtaining her doctorate, Tsuruta worked at the Smithsonian Astrophysical Observatory and then beginning in the early 1970s at NASA Goddard Space Flight Center She joined the faculty of the physics department at Montana State University as a visiting professor in 1977 and as a tenure track professor in 1990. In 2016, she became a professor emerita and research professor in physics at MSU. Tsuruta has also been a visiting professor at other institutions, including the Max Planck Institute for Astrophysics and several universities in Japan.

== Awards ==
In 2015, Tsuruta received the Marcel Grossmann Award "for pioneering the physics of hot neutron stars and their cooling." One of the other award recipients that year was Ken'ichi Nomoto, with whom she had collaborated on many papers and conference presentations beginning in 1980.

== Selected works ==
- Neutron Star Models. Ph.D. thesis. Columbia University, 1964
- with A. G. W. Cameron: "Cooling and detectability of neutron stars", Can. J. Phys., Volume 44, 1966, p. 1863–1894
- "Thermal properties and detectability of neutron stars. I. cooling and heating of neutron stars", Physics Reports, Volume 56, 1979, p. 237–277
- "Thermal properties and detectability of neutron stars. II. Thermal evolution of rotation-powered neutron stars", Physics Reports, Volume 292, 1998, p. 1–130
- with David Pines, R. Tamagaki (ed.): The structure and evolution of neutron stars, Basic Books 1992
- "Neutron Star Cooling: the Present and the Future", in: Neutron Stars and Pulsars, Astrophysics and Space Science Library Vol. 357, Springer Lecture Series (AIP), 2009, p. 289–318
- with J. Sadino, A. Kobelski, M. Teter, A. Liebmann, T. Takatsuka, K. Nomoto, H. Umeda: "Thermal Evolution of Hyperon-mixed Neutron Stars", Astrophysical Journal, Volume 691, 2009, p. 621–632
- with H. Umeda, N. Yoshida, K. Nomoto, M. Sasaki, T. Ohkubo: "Early Black Hole Formation by Accretion of Gas and Dark Matter", Journal of Cosmology and Astroparticle Physics, Volume 8, 2009, p. 23
- with T. Ohkubo, K. Nomoto, H. Umeda, N. Yoshida: "Evolution of Very Massive Population III: Stars with Mass Accretion from Pre-Main Sequence to Collapse", Astrophysical Journal, Volume 706, 2009, p. 1184–1193
- with J.R. Plowman, D.C. Jacobs, R.W. Hellings, S.L. Larson: "Constraining the Black Hole Mass Spectra with Gravitational Wave Observations I: Error Kernel", Monthly Notices of Royal Astronomical Society, Volume 401, 2010, p. 2706–2714
- "Thermal Radiation from Pulsars", in: K. Makishima (ed.), The Energetic Cosmos: Suzaku to Astro-H, AIP 2010, p. 166
- with J. R. Plowman, R. W. Hellings: "Constraining the Black Hole Mass Spectra with Gravitational Wave Observations II: Direct Comparison of Detailed Models", Monthly Notices of Royal Astronomical Society, Volume 415, 2011, p. 333–352
- "Thermal Evolution of Neutron Stars: Current Status", in: Proceedings of the 9th Pacific Rim Conference on Stellar Astrophysics (ASP Conference Series), 2012
