= Grant J. Mathews =

American astrophysicist

- Mathews at University of Notre Dame Commencement in 2011
- Born: October 14, 1950 (age 76)
- Education: Michigan State University (BS); University of Maryland, College Park (PhD)
- Awards: Fellow of the American Physical Society (1994)
- Scientific career
- Fields: Nuclear astrophysics, physical cosmology
- Workplaces: University of Notre Dame; Lawrence Livermore National Laboratory; Lawrence Berkeley National Laboratory; California Institute of Technology; International Center for Relativistic Astrophysics

Grant James Mathews (born October 14, 1950) is an American astrophysicist and professor of physics at the University of Notre Dame. His research concerns the origin of the heavy elements, Big Bang nucleosynthesis, relativistic hydrodynamics of compact objects, and cosmology, including inflationary models. He was elected a Fellow of the American Physical Society in 1994.

== Education and career ==
Mathews received a BS from Michigan State University in 1972 and a PhD from the University of Maryland, College Park in 1977. After the doctorate he was a research associate at Lawrence Berkeley Laboratory from 1977 to 1979 and a senior research fellow at the W. K. Kellogg Radiation Laboratory of the California Institute of Technology from 1979 to 1981. He then joined the Lawrence Livermore National Laboratory, where he later led the astrophysics group and was a senior scientist in the Physical Sciences and Space Technologies Directorate.

He became a professor of physics at Notre Dame in November 1994. He later served as director of the university’s Center for Astrophysics. From 2015, he has been the James Ricker Wilson Adjunct Professor of Physics at the International Center for Relativistic Astrophysics (ICRANet) in Pescara, Italy.

== Research ==
Mathews’s published work treats the origin of the heavy elements, compact-object hydrodynamics, and cosmology.

In a 1990 review in Nature, Mathews and John J. Cowan summarized nuclear and astronomical constraints on the r-process then available and argued that Type II supernovae were the most likely site on that evidence. With Bradley S. Meyer, Stanford E. Woosley and others he calculated r-process yields in the high-entropy bubble above a newly formed neutron star, and a 1994 paper with Woosley, James R. Wilson and collaborators treated the r-process in neutrino-heated supernova ejecta. After the gravitational-wave event GW170817 associated a neutron-star merger with a kilonova, later reviews treated mergers as a confirmed r-process site while leaving open how much of Galactic enrichment they supply relative to rare core-collapse events. A 2019 review in Progress in Particle and Nuclear Physics co-authored by Mathews surveyed nuclear input, stellar observations, and those candidate sites.

With Charles Alcock and George M. Fuller he calculated the effect of a quark–hadron transition in the early universe on Big Bang nucleosynthesis, including baryon-number fluctuations and the resulting light-element abundances. With Robert A. Malaney he reviewed non-standard big-bang nucleosynthesis in Physics Reports.

Later papers treated inflation and the cosmic microwave background. With Mayukh R. Gangopadhyay, Kiyotomo Ichiki and Toshitaka Kajino he examined whether resonant superstring excitations during inflation could account for low-multipole anomalies in the CMB power spectrum. With Miguel Correa, Gangopadhyay and Nur Jaman he studied warm natural inflation as a setting in which primordial black holes in a restricted mass window could supply the dark-matter density while remaining consistent with CMB constraints.

In 1995 Wilson and Mathews reported numerical calculations in which two neutron stars in a close binary each collapsed before merging. The claim was disputed. Éanna Flanagan argued that the simulations used an incorrect definition of momentum density in the momentum constraint equation and that the error could account for the reported compression. A corrected calculation by Mathews and Wilson found that the compression was reduced but not eliminated.

Wilson and Mathews described their numerical methods in Relativistic Numerical Hydrodynamics (Cambridge University Press, 2003). J. J. Monaghan reviewed the book in the Journal of Fluid Mechanics. A later review of grid-based methods in relativistic hydrodynamics cited the monograph as a treatment of artificial-viscosity techniques. With Guobao Tang he later wrote the textbook Introduction to Particle Physics and Cosmology (CRC Press, 2025).

With Luca Boccioli, In-Saeng Suh and Evan P. O’Connor he compared published nuclear equations of state in spherical core-collapse models that include a reduced-dimensional treatment of turbulence.

== Honors ==
Mathews was elected a Fellow of the American Physical Society in 1994, nominated by the Division of Astrophysics. The archived citation reads: “For contributions to the understanding of primordial nucleosynthesis and phase transitions in the early universe; neutron capture processes in stars and supernovae; galactic chemical evolution; cosmic-ray nucleosynthesis and cosmology.”

== Selected publications ==
- Wilson, James R.; Mathews, Grant J. (2003). Relativistic Numerical Hydrodynamics. Cambridge University Press. ISBN 978-0-521-63155-6.
- Kajino, T.; Aoki, W.; Balantekin, A. B.; Diehl, R.; Famiano, M. A.; Mathews, G. J. (2019). "Current status of r-process nucleosynthesis". Progress in Particle and Nuclear Physics. 107: 109–166. arXiv:1906.05002. doi:10.1016/j.ppnp.2019.02.008.
- Mathews, Grant; Tang, Guobao (2025). Introduction to Particle Physics and Cosmology. CRC Press. doi:10.1201/9781032683546. ISBN 978-1-032-68353-9.
