= International Center for Relativistic Astrophysics =

Italian-based research organization

International Center for Relativistic Astrophysics - ICRA
- Type: International organization
- Established: 1985
- Founders: Paul Boyton, George Coyne, Francis Everitt, Fang Li-Zhi, Riccardo Giacconi, Remo Ruffini, Abdus Salam
- President: Yu Wang
- Location: Rome, Italy
- Website: http://www.icra.it

ICRA, the International Center for Relativistic Astrophysics is an international research institute for relativistic astrophysics and related areas. Its members are seven Universities and four organizations. The center is located in Rome, Italy.

The International Center for Relativistic Astrophysics (ICRA) was founded in 1985 by Remo Ruffini (University of Rome "La Sapienza") together with Riccardo Giacconi (Nobel Prize for Physics 2002), Abdus Salam (Nobel Prize for Physics 1979), Paul Boyton (University of Washington), George Coyne (former director of the Vatican observatory), Francis Everitt (Stanford University), Fang Li-Zhi (University of Science and Technology of China). It became a legal entity in 1991 with the Ministerial Decree 22/11/1991 from the Ministry of Education, Universities and Research.

In 1978 Fang was assigned to host Ruffini, a guest of the Chinese Academy of Sciences. They gave joint university lectures and developed a profound friendship. In 1981 in China they published a small book introducing relativistic astrophysics that became revered among astrophysics students. In 1982 Fang and Ruffini organized the first international conference on astrophysics in China—the third Marcel Grossmann Meeting—and thereafter remained organizers of the Grossmann meetings. Together with Abdus Salam, Riccardo Giacconi, George Coyne, and Francis Everitt, they founded the International Center for Relativistic Astrophysics (ICRA) in 1985. Physics Today

The International Center of Relativistic Astrophysics is located in the Department of Physics building at the main Campus of the University of Rome "Sapienza".

In 2005 ICRA has been among the founders of ICRANet, the International Center for Relativistic Astrophysics Network. The national activities of research and teaching in Italy remained operative at ICRA in Rome, while international activities and coordination are now based in ICRANet in Pescara.

== Structure ==
President: Yu Wang

Former President: Remo Ruffini

ICRA Council:

Stefano Ansoldi, University of Udine

Francesco Haardt, University of Insubria

Paul Boynton, University of Washington in Seattle

Remo Ruffini, former President and Director of Research

== Member institutions ==
International Centre For Theoretical Physics (ICTP) - Trieste (Italy)

Space Telescope Institute - Baltimore - Maryland - (USA)

Specola Vaticana - Castelgandolfo (Vatican City)

Stanford University - Stanford, California (USA)

University Campus Bio-Medico of Rome (Italy)

University of Science and Technology of China (China)

University of Insubria (Italy)

University of Rome "Sapienza" (Italy)

University of Udine (Italy)

University of Washington at Seattle (USA)

World Academy of Sciences (TWAS) - Trieste (Italy)

== International collaboration ==
Collaboration agreements have been signed between ICRA and scientific institutions worldwide, in particular:

AIGRC (The Australian International Gravitational Research Centre), Australia

ARSEC (Astrophysical Research center for the Structure and Evolution of the Cosmos), South Korea

BAO (Beijing Astronomical Observatory), China

CECS (Centro de Estudios Cientificos de Santiago), Chile

Universidad Nacional de Colombia, Colombia

IHES (Institut Hautes Etudes Scientifiques), France

KSNU (Kyrgiz State National University), Kyrgyzstan

IPM (Keldysh Institute for Applied Mathematics), Russia

MEPhI (Moscow State Engineering Physics Institute), Russia

NCST (National Centre for Science and Technology), Vietnam

OCA (Côte d’Azur Observatory), France

PAO (Pyongyang Astronomical Observatory), North Korea

University of Tirana, Albania

YITP (Yukawa Institute for Theoretical Physics), Japan

UADP (Physics Department, University of Arizona), USA

== IRAP PhD ==
Since 2002, ICRA co-organizes an International Ph.D. program in Relativistic Astrophysics - International Relativistic Astrophysics Ph.D. Program, IRAP-PhD, the first joint PhD astrophysics program.

== Other activities ==
=== Meetings initiated by ICRA ===
Marcel Grossmann meetings

It is believed that in honor of Marcel Grossman's work and collaboration with Einstein, Remo Ruffini and Abdus Salam established in 1975 the Marcel Grossmann meetings (MG) on Recent Developments in Theoretical and Experimental General Relativity, Gravitation, and Relativistic Field Theories which take place every three years in different countries. MG1 and MG2 were held in 1975 and in 1979 in Trieste; MG3 in 1982 in Shanghai; MG4 in 1985 in Rome; MG5 in 1988 in Perth; MG6 in 1991 in Kyoto; MG7 in 1994 at Stanford; MG8 in 1997 in Jerusalem; MG9 in 2000 in Rome; MG10 in 2003 in Rio de Janeiro; MG11 in 2006 in Berlin; MG12 in 2009 in Paris; MG13 in 2012 in Stockholm; MG14 in 2015 in Rome.

Italian-Korean Meetings on Relativistic Astrophysics

The Italian-Korean Symposia on Relativistic Astrophysics is a series of biannual meetings organized alternatively in Italy and in Korea since 1987. It has been focused on exchange of information and collaborations between Italian and Korean astrophysicists on new issues in the field of Relativistic Astrophysics. The symposia cover topics in astrophysics and cosmology, such as gamma ray bursts and compact stars, high energy cosmic rays, dark energy and dark matter, general relativity, black holes, and new physics related to cosmology.

William Fairbank Meetings on Relativistic Gravitational Experiments in Space

The First William Fairbank Meeting was held at the University of Rome "La Sapienza," in 1990, under the auspices of ICRA with support from ASI (Italian Space Agency), ESA (European Space Agency), the Vatican Observatory, Stanford University and the University of Rome. Almost 80 physicists and engineers in widely diversified fields relativistic gravitation, space research, SQUID technology, large scale cryogenics, clock technology, laser and radar science and other fields - came together in the kinds of free technical exchange so characteristic of William Fairbank, in whose honor the meeting was held. The second meeting was held in Hong Kong and was devoted to relativistic gravitational experiments in space. The third meeting held in Rome and Pescara in 1998 was focused on the Lense-Thirring effect.

First William Fairbank Meeting, Rome, 10–14 September 1990, ICRA, University of Rome "La Sapienza" - ICRA Network, Pescara.

Second William Fairbank Meeting, December 13–16, 1993, Hong Kong

Third William Fairbank Meeting. The Lense-Thirring Effect, June 29 - July 4, 1998, ICRA, University of Rome "La Sapienza" - ICRA Network, Pescara.

The Galileo-Xu Guangqi meetings

The Galileo-Xu Guangqi meetings have been created in the name of Galileo and Xu Guangqi, the collaborator of Matteo Ricci (Ri Ma Dou), generally recognized for bringing to China the works of Euclid and Galileo and for his strong commitment to the process of modernization and scientific development of China. The 1st Galileo - Xu Guangqi Meeting was held in Shanghai, China in 2009. The 2nd Galileo - Xu Guangqi meeting took place in Hanbury Botanic Gardens (Ventimiglia, Italy) and Villa Ratti (Nice, France) in 2010. The 3rd and 4th Galileo - Xu Guangqi meetings were held in Beijing, China in 2011 and 2015, respectively.

=== ICRA Network Workshops ===
INW I: LXV of R. Giacconi, Rome and Castelgandolfo, October 24–26, 1997

INW II: The Chaotic Universe, Rome and Pescara, February 1–5, 1999

INW III: Electrodynamics and Magnetohydrodynamics around Black Holes, Rome and Pescara, July 12–24, 1999

INW IV: Science at new Millennium, UWA, March 10–14, 2000

INW VI: Time structures in Relativistic Astrophysics, Pescara, July 2–14, 2001

INW VIII: Step and General Relativity, Pescara, September 16–21, 2002

INW IX: Fermi and Astrophysics, Rome and Pescara, October 3–7, 2001

INW X: Black Holes, Gravitational Waves and Cosmology, Rome and Pescara, July 15–20, 2002

INW XV: Testing the Equivalence Principle on Ground and in Space, Rome and Pescara, Italy September 20–23, 2004

== Publications ==
In addition to the proceedings of conferences several books have been published, in particular:

"Fermi and Astrophysics", Eds. V.G. Gurzadyan and R. Ruffini, SIF, Bologna, 2002
"The Chaotic Universe", Advanced Series in Astrophysics and Cosmology - Vol. 10, Eds. V.G. Gurzadyan and R. Ruffini, World Scientific, 2000
"Exploring the Universe", Advanced Series in Astrophysics and Cosmology - Vol. 13, Eds. H. Gursky, R. Ruffini and L. Stella, World Scientific, 2000
"Nonlinear gravitodynamics. The Lense-Thirring Effect", Eds. R. Ruffini and C. Sigismondi, World Scientific, 2003
"Physics and Astrophysics of Neutron Stars and Black Holes", 2nd edition, Eds. R. Giacconi and R. Ruffini, Cambridge Scientific Publishers, 2009
"Gravitazione e spazio tempo", Hans C. Ohanian e Remo Ruffini, First Edizione Italiana, 1997
"Gravitation and Spacetime", Hans C. Ohanian e Remo Ruffini, Second Edition, 1994
"Gravitation and Spacetime", Hans C. Ohanian e Remo Ruffini, Third Edition, 2013
"Gravitation and Spacetime", Hans C. Ohanian e Remo Ruffini, Translation copyright 2001 by ACANET

== ICRA and G9 history ==
The history of the relativistic astrophysics group in the Department of Physics (Fisica) of the University of Rome "La Sapienza" led by Remo Ruffini, started with his appointment to a chair of theoretical physics there in 1978 is represented here.

== Marcel Grossmann Awards ==
Each meeting, one or two institutions and between two and six individual scientists are selected to receive the Marcel Grossmann Award. Each recipient is presented with a silver T. E. S. T. sculpture designed by artist A. Pierelli.

Date	Category	Winner
2021	Institution	Lavochkin Association
	Institution	Max Planck Institute for extraterrestrial Physics
	Institution	Space Research Institute of the Russian Academy of Sciences
	Individual	Demetrios Christodoulou
	Individual	Gerard 't Hooft
	Individual	Tsvi Piran
	Individual	Steven Weinberg
2018	Institution	Planck Scientific Collaboration (ESA)
	Institution	Hansen Experimental Physics Laboratory at Stanford University
	Individual	Lyman Page
	Individual	Rashid Alievich Sunyaev
	Individual	Shing-Tung Yau
2015	Institution	European Space Agency (ESA)
	Individual	Ken'ichi Nomoto
	Individual	Martin Rees
	Individual	Yakov Sinai
	Individual	Sachiko Tsuruta
	Individual	T. D. Lee
	Individual	C. N. Yang
2012	Institution	AlbaNova University Center
	Individual	David Arnett
	Individual	Vladimir Belinski and Isaak M. Khalatnikov
	Individual	Filippo Frontera
2009	Institution	Institut des Hautes Etudes Scientifique (IHES)
	Individual	Jaan Einasto
	Individual	Christine Jones
	Individual	Michael Kramer
2006	Institution	Freie Universität Berlin
	Individual	Roy Kerr
	Individual	George Coyne
	Individual	Joachim Träumper
2003	Institution	CBPF (Brazilian Center for Research in Physics)
	Individual	Yvonne Choquet-Bruhat and James W. York, Jr.
	Individual	Yuval Ne'eman
2000	Institution	The Solvay Institutes (Solvay Instituts Internationaux de Physique et de Chimie)
	Individual	Riccardo Giacconi
	Individual	Roger Penrose
	Individual	Cecile DeWitt and Bryce DeWitt
1997	Institution	Hebrew University
	Individual	Tullio Regge
	Individual	Francis Everitt
1994	Institution	Space Telescope Science Institute
	Individual	Subrahmanyan Chandrasekhar
	Individual	Jim Wilson
1991	Institution	Hiroshima University Research Institute for Theoretical Physics
	Individual	Minoru Oda
	Individual	Stephen Hawking
1988	Institution	The University of Western Australia
	Individual	Satio Hayakawa
	Individual	John Archibald Wheeler
1985	Institution	The Vatican Observatory
	Individual	William Fairbank
	Individual	Abdus Salam
