= George Coyne =

American Jesuit priest and astronomer (1933–2020)

The Rev. George Coyne S.J.
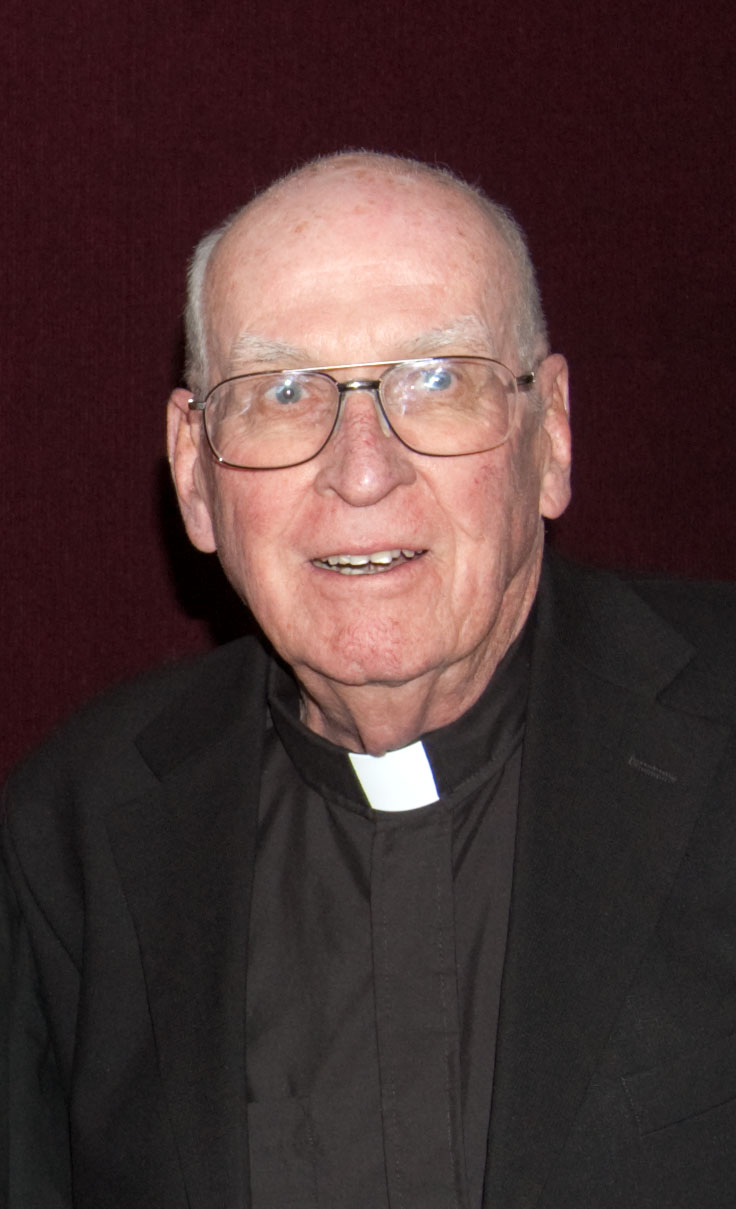
- Born: George Vincent Coyne; January 19, 1933; Baltimore, Maryland, U.S.
- Died: February 11, 2020 (aged 87); Syracuse, New York, U.S.
- Education: Fordham University (B.S.); Georgetown University (Ph.D.)
- Scientific career
- Fields: Astrophysics
- Workplaces: Vatican Observatory

George Vincent Coyne, S.J. (January 19, 1933 – February 11, 2020) was an American Jesuit priest and astronomer who directed the Vatican Observatory and headed its research group at the University of Arizona from 1978 to 2020.

From January 2012 until his death, he taught at Le Moyne College in Syracuse, New York. His career was dedicated to the reconciliation of theology and science, while his stance on scripture was absolute: "One thing the Bible is not," he said in 1994, "is a scientific textbook. Scripture is made up of myth, of poetry, of history. But it is simply not teaching science."

== Early years and education ==
George Coyne was born in Baltimore on January 19, 1933, the third of eight siblings. He entered the Jesuit novitiate in Wernersville, Pennsylvania, after attending Loyola High School in Blakefield, Maryland, on scholarship and graduating in 1951. He earned his bachelor's degree in mathematics and his licentiate in philosophy at Fordham University in 1958.

He carried out a spectrophotometric study of the lunar surface to obtain his doctorate in astronomy from Georgetown University in 1962. He spent the summer of 1963 doing research at Harvard University, the summer of 1964 as a National Science Foundation lecturer at the University of Scranton, and the summer of 1965 as visiting research professor at the University of Arizona Lunar and Planetary Laboratory (UA LPL). He obtained a licentiate in sacred theology at Woodstock College and was ordained a priest in 1966. Coyne was visiting assistant professor at the UA LPL in 1966-67 and 1968–69 and a visiting astronomer at the Vatican Observatory in 1967–68.

== Director of Vatican Observatory ==
Coyne joined the Vatican Observatory as an astronomer in 1969 and became an assistant professor at the LPL in 1970. In 1976 he became a senior research fellow at the LPL and a lecturer in the UA Department of Astronomy. The following year he served as Director of the UA's Catalina Observatory and as associate director of the LPL. Pope John Paul I appointed him Director of the Vatican Observatory in 1978, and also associate director of the UA Steward Observatory. During 1979-80 he served as acting director and Head of the UA Steward Observatory and the Astronomy Department. He spent five months of the year in Tucson as adjunct professor in the University of Arizona Astronomy Department.

As Director of the Vatican Observatory he was a driving force in several new educational and research initiatives. He recruited young astronomers worldwide and established a program for non-resident adjunct appointments that allowed women to participate. Women accounted for almost half the participants in the biennial Vatican Observatory Summer School he established for astronomy graduate students. In the 1990s he organized conferences at the Observatory's headquarters in Castel Gandolfo, including one titled "God's Action in the Universe" sponsored jointly with the Center for Theology and the Natural Sciences of Berkeley, California. One of his successors said Coyne only asked his hires to do "good science" and that "He created a space where we were all free to pursue that science. He acted as a firewall between us and the vagaries of the Vatican. He made us welcome and he made our collaborators and visitors welcome."

In 2002, he co-authored with Alessandro Omizzolo, a priest-astronomer on the staff of the Observatory, Wayfarers in the Cosmos: The Human Quest for Meaning. He also took on a public role as an expert on the intersection of science and Catholicism. In 1994 he said that he was open to the existence of extraterrestrial life and that Christianity could reconcile its theology with such a discovery. He criticized the Church's lukewarm acceptance of responsibility for its prosecution of Galileo in the early seventeenth century.

Coyne was a vocal proponent of the view that a scientific view of evolution in its classic form, including its random nature, is compatible with Catholic teaching. In August 2005, he sharply critiqued an op-ed column in which Cardinal Christoph Schönborn appeared to question that position. (Note: Two years later Coyne praised Schönborn's detailed account of his views, which Coyne understood as drawing distinctions between evolution and "evolutionism", which extends evolution beyond the science into reductionist judgements of human worth. Coyne believed his dispute with Schönborn would not have arisen had Schönborn shared those views earlier.) He wrote that "If they respect the results of modern science, and indeed the best of modern biblical research, religious believers must move away from the notion of a dictator God or a designer God, a Newtonian God who made the universe as a watch that ticks along regularly.” He proposed an alternative view of God's role as creator: "God in his infinite freedom continuously creates a world that reflects that freedom at all levels of the evolutionary process to greater and greater complexity. He is not continually intervening, but rather allows, participates, loves." In November 2005, he said that "Intelligent design isn't science even though it pretends to be. If you want to teach it in schools, intelligent design should be taught when religion or cultural history is taught, not science."

From 2007 to 2011 Coyne directed the Vatican Observatory Foundation.

== Scientific research ==
Coyne's research interests were in polarimetric studies of the interstellar medium, stars with extended atmospheres, and Seyfert galaxies, which are a class of spiral galaxies with very small and unusually bright star-like centers. Polarimetry studies can reveal the properties of cosmic dust and synchrotron radiation regions in galaxies and other astronomical objects. In later years he studied the polarization produced in cataclysmic variable stars, or interacting binary star systems that give off sudden bursts of intense energy, and dust about young stars. The asteroid 14429 Coyne is named for him.

Coyne was an active member of the International Astronomical Union, the American Astronomical Society, the Astronomical Society of the Pacific, the American Physical Society and the Optical Society of America.

In 1985, Coyne, along with Remo Ruffini (University of Rome "La Sapienza"), Riccardo Giacconi (Nobel Prize for Physics 2002), Abdus Salam (Nobel Prize for Physics 1979), Paul Boynton (University of Washington), Francis Everitt (Stanford University), Fang Li-Zhi (University of Science and Technology of China) founded the International Center for Relativistic Astrophysics (ICRA) in order to collaborate and exchange ideas among astrophysicists around the world.

== Retirement ==
Coyne's tenure at the Vatican Observatory ended with the appointment of Argentine astronomer José Gabriel Funes to succeed him on August 19, 2006. Funes rejected tabloid speculation that Coyne's dispute with Schönborn had anything to do with his retirement. Coyne, then 73, said the idea was "simply not true".

In retirement, Coyne discussed that he did not, and other Christians should not, have problems reconciling his faith in Christ with contemporary scientific topics. In 2008, with Michael Heller, he co-authored Comprehensible Universe: The Interplay of Science and Theology.

Interviewed in the 2008 documentary film Religulous by political commentator Bill Maher, Coyne said that since all of the scriptures are written around/between 2000 BC and 200 AD, and modern science has only come into existence in the last couple of hundred years, the scriptures contain no science and should not be taught as science. He said:

How in the world could there be any science in Scripture? There can not be, 'cause the two historical periods (Scripture and Modern Science) are separated by so much. The Scriptures are not teaching science. It's very hard for me to accept not just a literal interpretation of Scripture, but a fundamentalist approach to religious belief. It's kind of a plague. It presents itself as science, and it's not.

In 2015 Coyne applauded Pope Francis for discussing the importance of caring for the environment and addressing the need for Christians to tackle the issue of climate change caused by human activity. He described Francis' encyclical Laudato Si' as "probably the most challenging encyclical since the great social encyclicals of Pope Leo XIII and Pope Pius XI in the 19th and early 20th centuries, which discussed the rights and duties of capital and labor". Coyne thought it "may very well provoke one of the most important dialogues between science and religion since the days of Charles Darwin".

Coyne died of bladder cancer on February 11, 2020, at a hospital in Syracuse at the age of 87.

== Honors ==
Coyne received an honorary doctorate by Le Moyne College of Syracuse, New York, a Jesuit institution, on May 17, 2009, in recognition of "his tireless effort to promote an open dialogue between philosophy, theology, and the sciences" as part of his work "to bridge the gap between faith and science."

In 2008 Villanova University awarded Coyne the Mendel Medal, which recognizes outstanding scientists who have advanced the cause of science and demonstrated that between true science and true religion there is no intrinsic conflict.

In 2010 he was awarded the George Van Biesbroeck Prize by the American Astronomical Society.

Coyne received honorary degrees from St. Peter's University (1980), Loyola University Chicago (1994), the University of Padua (1995), the Pontifical Theological Academy of the Jagellonian University (1997), Marquette University (2005), and Boston College (2007).

== Select writings ==
The Vatican Observatory Foundation hosts some of Coyne's writings and videos online.

Author

- Coyne, George V. (2013). "A Theology of Everything". European Review. 21 (S1): S20–S26. doi:10.1017/S1062798713000094.
- "In the Beginning..." Science & Spirit. 17 (6): 24–27. 2006. doi:10.3200/SSPT.17.6.24-27.
- Coyne, George V. (2012). "Review of: Defending Copernicus and Galileo: Critical Reasoning in the Two Affairs". Catholic Historical Review. 98 (2): 380–381. doi:10.1353/cat.2012.0126. S2CID 161240772.
- "Evolution and Intelligent Design: What Is Science and What Is Not". Revista Portuguesa de Filosofia. 66 (4): 717–720. 2010.
- Coyne, George V. (2010). "Galileo's telescopic observations: the marvel and meaning of discovery". Proceedings of the International Astronomical Union. 6: 3–6. Bibcode:2010IAUS..269....3C. doi:10.1017/S1743921310007192.
- Coyne, George V. (2013). "Science Meets Biblical Exegesis in the Galileo Affair". Zygon: Journal of Religion & Science. 48 (1): 221–229. doi:10.1111/j.1467-9744.2012.01324.x.
- Coyne, George V. (2009). "Talking about and teaching evolution". Developmental Biology. 331 (2): 402. doi:10.1016/j.ydbio.2009.05.063.
- Coyne, George V. (1999). "The church's route to enlightenment". Nature. 402 (6762): 579. Bibcode:1999Natur.402..579C. doi:10.1038/45070. S2CID 4318163.
- Coyne, George V. (January 2008). "The Evolution Debate". Physics Teacher. 46 (1): 6–7. Bibcode:2008PhTea..46....6C. doi:10.1119/1.2823990.

Co-author

- George Coyne; Alessandro Omizzolo (2002). Wayfarers in the Cosmos: The Human Quest for Meaning. Herder & Herder. Bibcode:2002wchq.book.....C,
- George Coyne; Michael Heller (2008). A Comprehensible Universe: The Interplay of Science and Theology. Springer. ISBN 978-3540776246,
- Farber, Steven A.; Darnell, Diana K.; Coyne, George V. (2009). "Talking about science/evolution to a fellow bus rider". Developmental Biology. 331 (2): 402. doi:10.1016/j.ydbio.2009.05.064,

== See also ==
- Evolution and the Roman Catholic Church
- List of Jesuit scientists
- List of Roman Catholic scientist-clerics

== Notes ==
Catholic Church titles
Preceded by New creation	Director of the Vatican Observatory; 1978 - 2006	Succeeded by Juan Daviu cuarto
