= Daniela Calzetti =

Italian-American astrophysicist

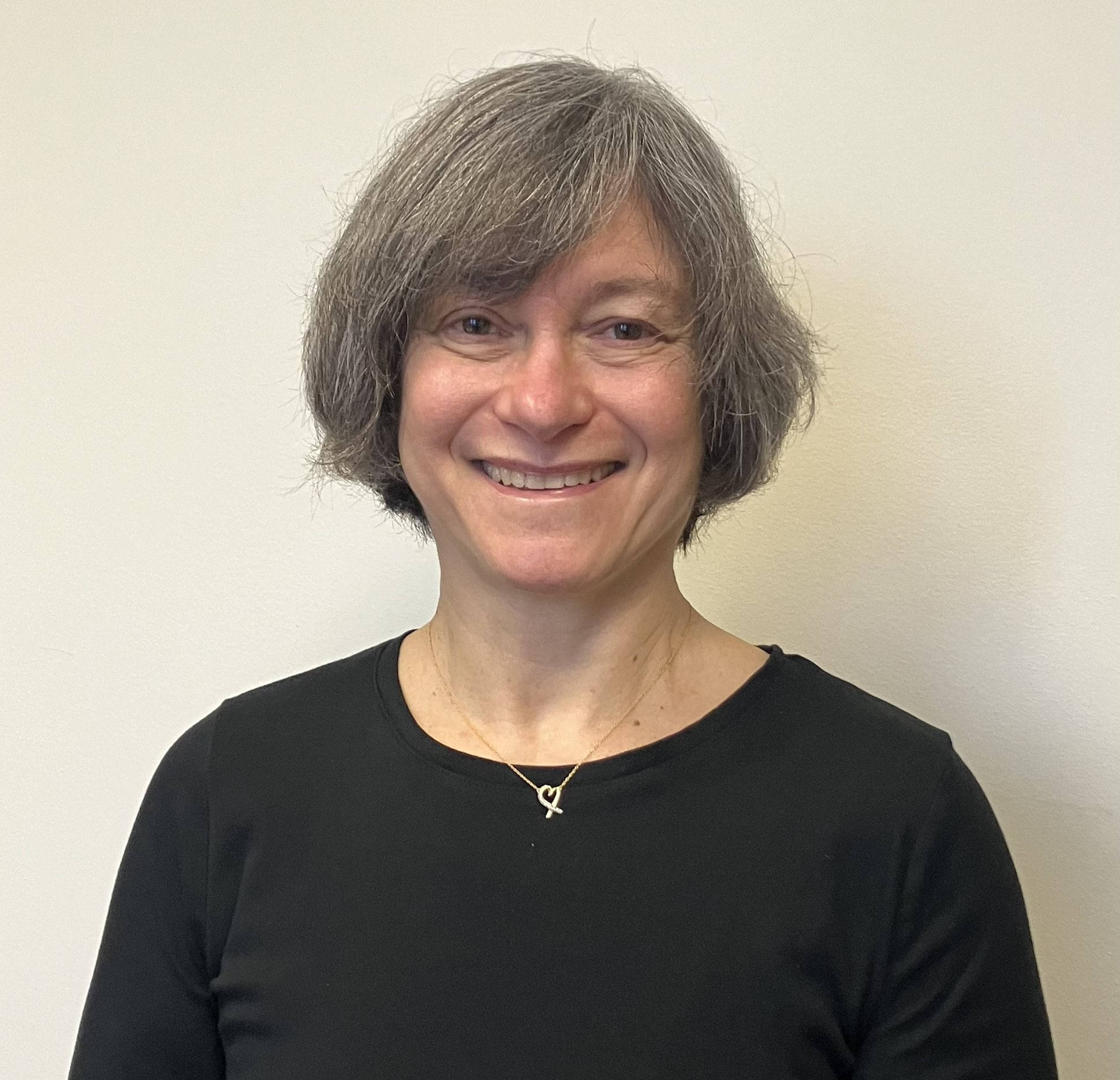
- Born: Parma, Italy
- Education: Sapienza University of Rome
- Known for: Calzetti dust extinction law
- Scientific career
- Fields: Astronomy
- Thesis: Large-Scale Distribution of Galaxies and Clusters: The Scale of Inhomogeneity (1992)
- Doctoral advisor: Remo Ruffini

Daniela Calzetti is an Italian-American astronomer known for her research on cosmic dust, star formation, and galaxy formation and evolution, and in particular for the Calzetti dust attenuation law, an estimate for how much information about distant galaxies has been obscured by cosmic dust. She is a professor of astronomy at the University of Massachusetts Amherst, and principal investigator of the Legacy ExtraGalactic Ultraviolet Survey project of the Hubble Space Telescope.

== Education and career ==
Calzetti is originally from Parma. She earned a laurea in physics from Sapienza University of Rome in 1987, where she completed her Ph.D. in 1992, with the dissertation Large-Scale Distribution of Galaxies and Clusters: The Scale of Inhomogeneity supervised by Remo Ruffini.

She worked as a researcher for the Space Telescope Science Institute from 1990 to 2007, when she moved to the University of Massachusetts Amherst.

== Recognition ==
Calzetti was elected to the National Academy of Sciences in 2020.
