= Remo Ruffini =

Italian astrophysicist (born 1942)

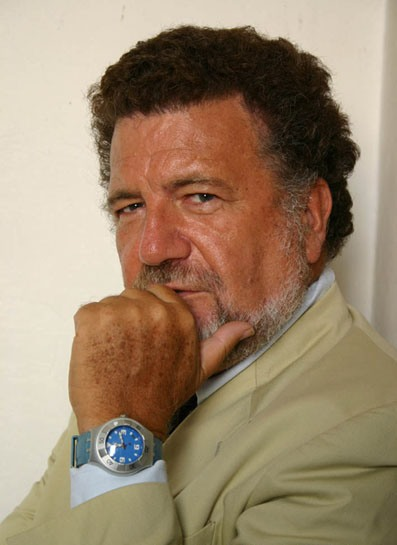
- Ruffini, Remo
- Born: May 17, 1942 (age 84); La Brigue, France
- Known for: Co-Founder & Director of International Center for Relativistic Astrophysics and ICRANet; Black Hole Identification
- Spouse: Anna Imponente
- Children: 1
- Scientific career
- Fields: Astrophysics
- Doctoral students: Daniela Calzetti

Remo Ruffini (born May 17, 1942, La Brigue, Alpes-Maritimes, at that time, Briga Marittima, Italy) is an Italian astrophysicist. He is the Director of ICRANet, International Centre for Relativistic Astrophysics Network and one of the founders of the International Centre for Relativistic Astrophysics (ICRA). Ruffini initiated the International Relativistic Astrophysics PhD (IRAP PhD), a common graduate school program of several universities and research institutes for the education of theoretical astrophysicists. He is the Director of the Erasmus Mundus IRAP PhD program (IRAP Ph D Erasmus Mundus). He has been Professor of Theoretical Physics at the University of Rome "Sapienza" from 1978 to 2012.

== Biography ==
After obtaining his degree in 1966 in Rome, he was a post-doctoral fellow at the Mainz Academy of Sciences working with Pascual Jordan, in West Germany. Then, he was a post-doctoral fellow with John Wheeler and Member of the Institute for Advanced Study in Princeton and later became an instructor and assistant professor at Princeton University. In 1975, he was a visiting professor at the Universities of Kyoto (Japan) and of Western Australia, Perth. In the years 1975–78, he worked with NASA, being a member of the task force on the scientific use of space stations. In 1976 he became professor of theoretical physics at the University of Catania and in 1978 he was appointed a professor at the University "Sapienza". In 1985, he was elected president of the International Center for Relativistic Astrophysics (ICRA). In 1984 he was a cofounder, with Abdus Salam, of the Marcel Grossmann Meetings. In 1987, he became co-chairman of the Italian-Korean Meetings on Relativistic Astrophysics. In the years 1989–93, he was President of the Scientific Committee of the Italian Space Agency. He is the editor of a variety of scientific journals. He is married to Anna Imponente and has a son, Iacopo.

His theoretical work led to the concept of boson stars. His classic article with John Wheeler popularized the astrophysical concept of Black Hole. With Demetrios Christodoulou he has given the formula for a Kerr-Newmann Black Hole endowed of charge, mass and angular momentum. His theoretical work led to the identification of the first Black Holes in the Milky Way Galaxy.

Together with his student C. Rhoades, he established the absolute upper limit to the mass of neutron stars. With his student Robert Leach, he used such an upper limit for fixing the paradigm which enabled the identification of the first Black Hole in the Milky Way Galaxy, Cygnus X1, using the splendid data of the Uhuru satellite by Riccardo Giacconi and his group.

For these works, Ruffini won the A. Cressy Morrison Award of the New York Academy of Sciences in 1972.

With his students Calzetti, Giavalisco, Song and Taraglio, Ruffini developed the role of fractal structures in cosmology.

Together with his collaborator Thibault Damour, Ruffini suggested the applicability of the Heisenberg-Euler-Schwinger process of pair creation in black hole physics and identified the dyadosphere where these processes take place. Gamma ray bursts seem to give the observational evidence of such pair creation process in astrophysics, prior to the observation of such phenomenon in Earth based experiments and represent the first evidence of the energy extraction process from Black Holes (the blackholic energy).

== Books ==
He is co-author of 21 books, including:

- R. Giacconi and R. Ruffini, Physics and Astrophysics of Neutron Stars and Black Holes, LXXV E. Fermi Summer School, SIF and North Holland (1978); also translated into Russian
- R. Giacconi and R. Ruffini, Physics and Astrophysics of Neutron Stars and Black Holes 2nd edition, Cambridge Scientific Publishers, Cambridge (2009)
- R. Gursky and R. Ruffini, Neutron Stars, Black Holes and Binary X Ray Sources, H. Reidel (1975)
- H. Ohanian and R. Ruffini. Gravitation and Spacetime, W.W. Norton (1994); translated into Italian (Bologna: Zanichelli, 1997), Chinese (China Science Publishing, 2007) and Korean (Seoul: Shin Won, 2001)
- Bardeen, et al., Black Holes, Gordon & Breach (1973)
- M. Rees, J.A. Wheeler and R. Ruffini, Black Holes, Gravitational Waves and Cosmology, Gordon & Breach (1974)
- H. Sato and R. Ruffini, Black Holes, Tokyo (1976)
- L.Z. Fang and R. Ruffini, Basic Concepts in Relativistic Astrophysics, Beijing: Science Press (1981)
- F. Melchiorri and R. Ruffini, Gamow Cosmology, North Holland Pub. Co., (1986)

== Awards ==
- A. Cressy Morrison Award, from the New York Academy of Sciences (1972)
- Alfred P. Sloan Fellow Foundation (1974)
- Space Scientist of the Year (1992)
- Gravity Research Foundation Award 1970, 1971, 2019

== See also ==
- Ergosphere
- Schrödinger–Newton equation
