= José Gabriel Funes =

Argentine priest and astronomer (born 1963)

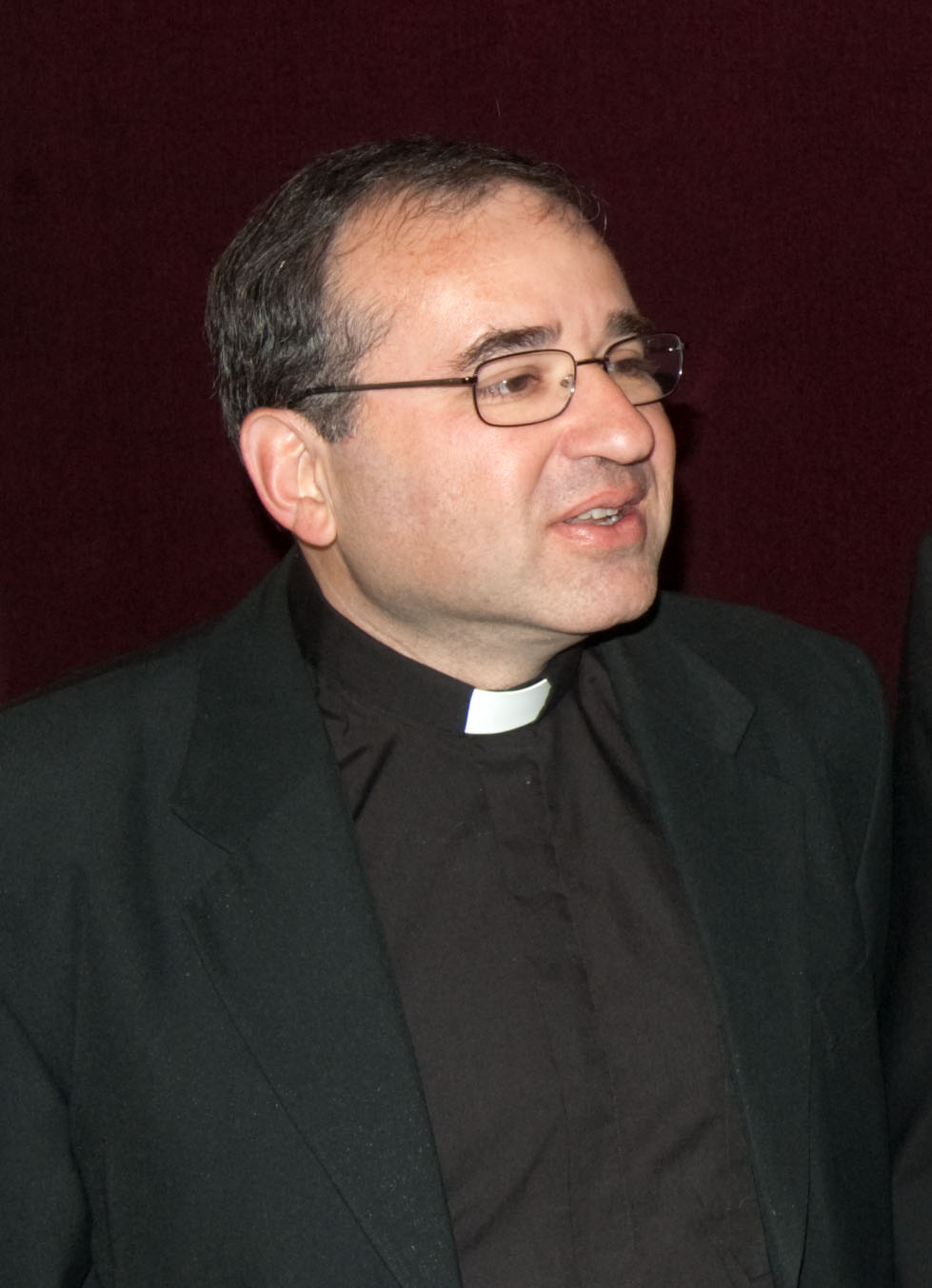
- Born: January 31, 1963 (age 63); ARG Córdoba
- Scientific career
- Fields: astrophysics
- Workplaces: Vatican Observatory

José Gabriel Funes, S.J. (born January 31, 1963, in Córdoba) is an Argentine Jesuit priest and astronomer. He was the Director of the Vatican Observatory from August 19, 2006, until September 18, 2015, when he was succeeded by Pope Francis's appointment of Brother Guy Consolmagno, S.J. Funes serves on the Advisory Council of METI (Messaging Extraterrestrial Intelligence).

== Biography ==
He has a master's degree in Astronomy from the Universidad Nacional de Córdoba in Argentina and a doctorate from the University of Padua in Italy. He also has a bachelor's degree in philosophy from University del Salvador in Argentina and a bachelor's degree in theology from Pontifical Gregorian University in Rome. A member of the Society of Jesus, he was ordained a priest in 1995. He joined the Vatican Observatory as a researcher in 2000, and was named its director on August 19, 2006, replacing Fr. George Coyne.

== Selected Papers ==
Funes has published approximately 30 refereed papers, mostly on the morphology and dynamics of galaxies.

Author	Title	Journal	Year
LAPASSET E. and FUNES J.G.	The peculiar behaviour of the photometric variability of V508 Ophiuchi.	Astrophys. Space Sci., 113, 83-87	1985
CORSINI E.M., PIZZELLA A., FUNES J.G., VEGA BELTRAN J.C. and BERTOLA F.	The circumnuclear ring of ionized gas in NGC 3593.	Astron. Astrophys., 337, 80-84	1998
VEGA BELTRAN J.C., ZEILINGER W.W., AMICO P., SCHULTHEIS M., CORSINI E.M., FUNES J.G., BECKMAN J. and BERTOLA F.	Mixed early and late-type properties in the bar of NGC 6221: Evidence for evolution along the Hubble sequence?	Astron. Astrophys., Suppl. Ser., 131, 105-114	1998
BERTOLA F., CAPPELLARI M., FUNES J.G., CORSINI E.M., PIZZELLA A. and VEGA BELTRAN J.C.	Circumnuclear Keplerian disks in galaxies.	Astrophys. J., 509, L93-L96	1998
CORSINI E.M., PIZZELLA A., SARZI M., CINZANO P., VEGA BELTRAN J.C., FUNES J.G., BERTOLA F., PERSIC M. and SALUCCI P.	Dark matter in early-type spiral galaxies: the case of NGC 2179 and of NGC 2775.	Astron. Astrophys., 342, 671-686	1999
BERTOLA F., CORSINI E.M., VEGA BELTRAN J.C., PIZZELLA A., SARZI M., CAPPELLARI M. and FUNES J.G.	The bulge-disk orthogonal decoupling in galaxies: NGC 4698.	Astrophys. J., 519, L127-L130	1999
SARZI M., CORSINI E.M., PIZZELLA A., VEGA BELTRAN J.C., CAPPELLARI M., FUNES J.G. and BERTOLA F.	NGC 4672: A new case of an early-type disk galaxy with an orthogonally decoupled core.	Astron. Astrophys., 360, 439-446	2000
FUNES J.G. and CORSINI E.M.	Galaxy disks and disk galaxies. (Conference highlights).	Publ. Astron. Soc. Pac., 112, 1510–1511	2000
VEGA BELTRAN J.C., PIZZELLA A., CORSINI E.M., FUNES J.G., ZEILINGER W.W., BECKMAN J.E. and BERTOLA F.	Kinematic properties of gas and stars in 20 disc galaxies.	Astron. Astrophys., 374, 394-411	2001
VENNIK J., FUNES J.G., RAFANELLI P. and RICHTER G.M.	Structure of the Seyfert 2 galaxy Mkn 955.	Astron. Gesellschaft Abstract Ser., 18, 210-210	2001
SARZI M., BERTOLA F., CAPPELLARI M., CORSINI E.M., FUNES J.G., PIZZELLA A. and VEGA BELTRAN J.C.	The orthogonal bulge-disc decoupling in NGC 4698.	Astrophys. Space Sci., 276, 467-473	2001
VEGA BELTRAN J.C., ZEILINGER W.W., PIZZELLA A., CORSINI E.M., BERTOLA F., FUNES J.G. and BECKMAN J.E.	Kinematics of gas and stars in 20 disc galaxies.	Astrophys. Space Sci., 276, 1201–1210	2001
PIGNATELLI E., VEGA BELTRAN J.C., BECKMAN J.E., CORSINI E.M., PIZZELLA A., SCARLATA C., BERTOLA F., FUNES J.G. and ZEILINGER W.W.	Modeling gas and stellar kinematics in disc galaxies NGC 772, NGC 3898 and NGC 7782.	Astrophys. Space Sci. Suppl., 277, 493-494	2001
PIGNATELLI E., CORSINI E.M., VEGA BELTRAN J.C., SCARLATA C., PIZZELLA A., FUNES J.G., ZEILINGER W.W., BECKMAN J.E. and BERTOLA F.	Modelling gaseous and stellar kinematics in the disc galaxies NGC 772, 3898 and 7782.	Mon. Not. R. Astron. Soc., 323, 188-210	2001
PIZZELLA A., BERTOLA F., SARZI M., CORSINI E.M., VEGA BELTRAN J.C., CAPPELLARI M. and FUNES J.G.	NGC 4672: a new case of an early-type disk galaxy with an orthogonally decoupled core.	Mem. Soc. Astron. Ital., 72, 797-800	2001
FUNES J.G.	Kinematics of the ionized gas in the inner regions of disk galaxies. (Dissertation summary).	Publ. Astron. Soc. Pac., 113, 257-257	2001
FUNES J.G., CORSINI E.M., CAPPELLARI M., PIZZELLA A., VEGA BELTRAN J.C., SCARLATA C. and BERTOLA F.	Position-velocity diagrams of ionized gas in the inner regions of disk galaxies.	Astron. Astrophys., 388, 50-67	2002
FUNES J.G., REJKUBA M., MINNITI D., AKIYAMA S. and KENNICUTT R.C.	Star formation in the disk of NGC 5128.	American Astron. Soc. meeting, 201, #20.23	2002
COCCATO L., CORSINI E.M., PIZZELLA A., MORELLI L., FUNES J.G. and BERTOLA F.	Minor-axis velocity gradients in disk galaxies'.	Astron. Astrophys., 416, 507-514	2004
LEE J.C., KENNICUTT R.C., FUNES J.G., SAKAI S., TREMONTI C.A. and VAN ZEE L.	11HUGS: The 11 Mpc H-{alpha} and ultraviolet galaxy survey.	American Astron. Soc. meeting, 205, #60.04	2004
KENNICUTT R.C., LEE J.C., AKIYAMA S., FUNES J.G. and SAKAI S.	An H-{alpha} imaging survey of galaxies in the local 11 Mpc volume.	American Astron. Soc. meeting, 205, #60.05	2004
KRALL C. and FUNES J.G.	H-alpha and UBR imaging of elliptical galaxies with dust lanes.	American Astron. Soc. meeting, 205, #92.04	2004
MINNITI D., REJKUBA M., FUNES J.G. and AKIYAMA S.	Optical counterparts of X-ray point sources observed by Chandra in NGC 5128: 20 new globular cluster X-ray sources.	Astrophys. J., 600, 716-728	2004
MINNITI D., REJKUBA M., FUNES J.G. and KENNICUTT R.C.Jr	The most exciting massive binary cluster in NGC 5128: clues to the formation of globular clusters.	Astrophys. J., 612, 215-221	2004
VILLEGAS D., MINNITI D. and FUNES J.G.	HST photometry of the binary globular cluster Sersic 13N-S in NGC 5128.	Astron. Astrophys., 442, 437-442	2005
GUTIERREZ C.M., ALONSO M.S., FUNES J.G. and RIBEIRO M.B.	Star formation in satellite galaxies.	Astron. J., 132, 596-607	2006
LEE J.C., KENNICUTT R.C., FUNES J.G., SAKAI S. and AKIYAMA S.	The star formation demographics of galaxies in the Local Volume.	Astrophys. J., 671, L113-L116	2007

== Views around Extraterrestrials ==
In an interview in May 2008 he stated that the possible existence of intelligent extraterrestrials did not contradict church teaching and ruling out the existence of aliens would be like "putting limits" on God's creative freedom. He has speculated that such alien life forms could even be “free from Original Sin ... [remaining] in full friendship with their creator.” He is also on record as stating "I continue to believe that God created the universe, and that we are not the product of chance, but the children of a good father, who has a design for us based on love," though he does believe in the Big Bang.

== See also ==
- List of Jesuit scientists
- List of Roman Catholic scientist-clerics

Catholic Church titles
Preceded by George Coyne	Director of the Vatican Observatory; 2006 - 2015	Succeeded by Guy Consolmagno
