= Ken'ichi Nomoto =

Japanese astrophysicist and astronomer

Ken'ichi Nomoto (野本 憲一 Nomoto Ken'ichi, born 1 December 1946 in Tokyo) is a Japanese astrophysicist and astronomer, known for his research on stellar evolution, supernovae, and the origin of heavy elements.

== Education and career ==
Nomoto graduated in astronomy from the University of Tokyo with a BS in 1969 and a PhD in 1974. As a postdoc he was a research fellow of the Japan Society for the Promotion of Science. At Ibaraki University he was an assistant professor from 1976 to 1981. At the University of Tokyo he became an assistant professor in 1982, an associate professor in 1985, and a full professor in 1993. At the Kavli Institute for the Physics and Mathematics of the Universe (IPMU) he was a principal investigator from 2007 to 2017, as well as a project professor from 2008 to 2017, and is since 2017 a visiting senior scientist. He was a research associate at NASA's Goddard Space Flight Center (1979–1981) and has held visiting positions at several institutions, including Garching's Max Planck Institute for Astrophysics (1982 and 1983), the University of Illinois Urbana-Champaign (1983), Brookhaven National Laboratory (1985–1986), the University of Amsterdam (1992), and the Kavli Institute for Theoretical Physics. He is now the University of Tokyo's Hamamatsu Professor in the endowed research unit, Dark Side of the Universe.

In 2008 he, with his colleagues Keiichi Maeda and Masaomi Tanaka, discovered by using the Subaru Telescope that most core-collapse supernovae are not spherically symmetric but instead elongated in shape. With Maeda and others, he reported that the spectral diversity in Type Ia supernovae (SNe Ia) is a consequence of random directions from which such asymmetric explosions are observed. Their empirical findings indicated that the spectral evolution diversity is not a serious concern in using SNe Ia as cosmological standard candles for determining distances. He was a member of an international team of astronomers that published in 2008 their study using the Subaru Telescope to observe "light echoes" in the remnant of Tycho's Supernova (SN 1572); such light echoes bounced off dust particle surrounding the remnant and reached Earth 436 years after Tycho Brahe's observation in 1572. The team compared their 2008 observed spectroscopic data with many other supernova spectra to show that Tycho's Supernova is a statistically typical example of a Type Ia supernova. He was part of the research group that revealed that the exceptionally bright Type Ia supernova named SN 2009dc had a progenitor star with a mass (1.44 M_{☉}) slightly above the Chandrasekhar limit due to its fast rotation. The discovery has implications for the common use of Type Ia supernovae as standard candles for measuring distances in the Universe. In 2010, he and colleagues succeeded in detecting a supernova (SN 2005cz), which is a core-collapse supernova with progenitor star at the low-mass end (i.e., 8 to 12 M⊙) of the range of massive stars that can produce supernovae. In 2012 he, with two colleagues, explained the fact that often no companion star was found in Type Ia supernovae. Their explanation is that, before the supernova explosion, the companion star of the binary star system evolved into a helium-rich white dwarf, which is difficult to observe. Their explanation solved a problem for the origin of Type I supernovae according to the single degenerate (SD) accretion scenario, in which a red giant or other main sequence star gradually loses mass by accretion onto the nearby white dwarf. In the competing double degenerate (DD) scenario, two white dwarfs with a high carbon-oxygen content merge.

== Awards ==
Nomoto received in 1989 the Nishina Memorial Prize, in 1995 the Japan Academy Medal, and in 2010 a medal from the Institut d'Astrophysique de Paris. In 2015, he received the Marcel Grossmann Award for showing theoretically that binary systems produce various forms of stellar evolution and can produce "various types of supernovae, hypernovae and gamma-ray bursts, as well as neutron stars and black holes." In 2016, Nomoto became a laureate of the Asian Scientist 100 by the Asian Scientist. In 2019, he received the Hans A. Bethe Prize of the American Physical Society for "lasting contributions to our understanding of the nuclear astrophysics of the universe, including stellar evolution, the synthesis of new elements, the theory of core-collapse and thermonuclear supernovae, and gamma-ray bursts." In 2020 he was awarded the Order of the Sacred Treasure. In 2026 he was awarded the Shaw Prize.

== Selected publications ==
- Kozasa, T.; Hasegawa, H.; Nomoto, K. (September 1991). "Formation of dust grains in the ejecta of SN 1987A. II". Astronomy and Astrophysics. 249 (2): 474–482. Bibcode:1991A&A...249..474K. hdl:2115/42842.
- van den Heuvel, E.P.J.; Bhattacharya, D.; Nomoto, K.; Rappaport, S.A. (August 1992). "Accreting white dwarf models for CAL 83, CAL 87 and other ultrasoft X-ray sources in the LMC". Astronomy and Astrophysics. 262: 97–105. Bibcode:1992A&A...262...97V. hdl:2289/1538.
- Rayet, M.; Arnould, M.; Hashimoto, M.; Prantzos, N.; Nomoto, K. (1995). "The p-process in Type II supernovae". Astronomy and Astrophysics. 298: 517. Bibcode:1995A&A...298..517R.
- Thielemann, F.-K.; Brachwitz, F.; Freiburghaus, C.; Kolbe, E.; Martinez-Pinedo, G.; Rauscher, T.; Rembges, F.; Hix, W.R.; Liebendörfer, M.; Mezzacappa, A.; Kratz, K.-L.; Pfeiffer, B.; Langanke, K.; Nomoto, K.; Rosswog, S.; Schatz, H.; Wiescher, W. (2001). "Element synthesis in stars". Progress in Particle and Nuclear Physics. 46 (1): 5–22. arXiv:astro-ph/0101476. Bibcode:2001PrPNP..46....5T. doi:10.1016/S0146-6410(01)00103-X. S2CID 14511842. 2001
- Frebel, Anna; Aoki, Wako; Christlieb, Norbert; Ando, Hiroyasu; Asplund, Martin; Barklem, Paul S.; Beers, Timothy C.; Eriksson, Kjell; Fechner, Cora; Fujimoto, Masayuki Y.; Honda, Satoshi; Kajino, Toshitaka; Minezaki, Takeo; Nomoto, Ken'Ichi; Norris, John E.; Ryan, Sean G.; Takada-Hidai, Masahide; Tsangarides, Stelios; Yoshii, Yuzuru (2005). "Nucleosynthetic signatures of the first stars". Nature. 434 (7035): 871–873. arXiv:astro-ph/0503021. Bibcode:2005Natur.434..871F. doi:10.1038/nature03455. PMID 15829957. S2CID 2010093. (over 700 citations)
- Mazzali, Paolo A.; Kawabata, Koji S.; Maeda, Keiichi; Nomoto, Ken'Ichi; Filippenko, Alexei V.; Ramirez-Ruiz, Enrico; Benetti, Stefano; Pian, Elena; Deng, Jinsong; Tominaga, Nozomu; Ohyama, Youichi; Iye, Masanori; Foley, Ryan J.; Matheson, Thomas; Wang, Lifan; Gal-Yam, Avishay (2005). "An Asymmetric Energetic Type Ic Supernova Viewed Off-Axis, and a Link to Gamma Ray Bursts". Science. 308 (5726): 1284–1287. arXiv:astro-ph/0505199. Bibcode:2005Sci...308.1284M. doi:10.1126/science.1111384. PMID 15919986. S2CID 14330491.
- Iwamoto, Nobuyuki; Umeda, Hideyuki; Tominaga, Nozomu; Nomoto, Ken'Ichi; Maeda, Keiichi (2005). "The First Chemical Enrichment in the Universe and the Formation of Hyper Metal-Poor Stars". Science. 309 (5733): 451–453. arXiv:astro-ph/0505524. Bibcode:2005Sci...309..451I. doi:10.1126/science.1112997. PMID 15933160. S2CID 20541345.
- Valenti, S.; et al. (2007). "The broad-lined Type Ic supernova 2003jd". Monthly Notices of the Royal Astronomical Society. 383 (4): 1485–1500. arXiv:0710.5173. doi:10.1111/j.1365-2966.2007.12647.x. S2CID 54528615.
- Bennett, M. E.; Hirschi, R.; Pignatari, M.; Diehl, S.; Fryer, C.; Herwig, F.; Hungerford, A.; Nomoto, K.; Rockefeller, G.; Timmes, F. X.; Wiescher, M. (2012). "The effect of 12C +12C rate uncertainties on the evolution and nucleosynthesis of massive stars". Monthly Notices of the Royal Astronomical Society. 420 (4): 3047–3070. arXiv:1201.1225. Bibcode:2012MNRAS.420.3047B. doi:10.1111/j.1365-2966.2012.20193.x. S2CID 119214904.
- Wang, Xiaofeng; et al. (2012). "Evidence for Type Ia supernovae diversity from ultraviolet observations with the Hubble Space Telescope". The Astrophysical Journal. 749 (2): 126–142. arXiv:1110.5809. Bibcode:2012ApJ...749..126W. doi:10.1088/0004-637X/749/2/126. S2CID 16425691.
- Nomoto, Ken'Ichi; Kobayashi, Chiaki; Tominaga, Nozomu (2013). "Nucleosynthesis in Stars and the Chemical Enrichment of Galaxies". Annual Review of Astronomy and Astrophysics. 51 (1): 457–509. Bibcode:2013ARA&A..51..457N. doi:10.1146/annurev-astro-082812-140956. (over 700 citations)
- Heger, A.; Nomoto, K.; Leung, S-C; Tolstov, A.; Wongwathanarat, A.; Gessner, A.; Gabler, M.; Ertl, T.; Melson, T.; Kresse, D.; Janka, H-T; Stockinger, G. (2020). "Three-dimensional models of core-collapse supernovae from low-mass progenitors with implications for Crab". Monthly Notices of the Royal Astronomical Society. 496 (2): 2039–2084. arXiv:2005.02420. doi:10.1093/mnras/staa1691.
