= Jaan Einasto =

Estonian astrophysicist (born 1929)

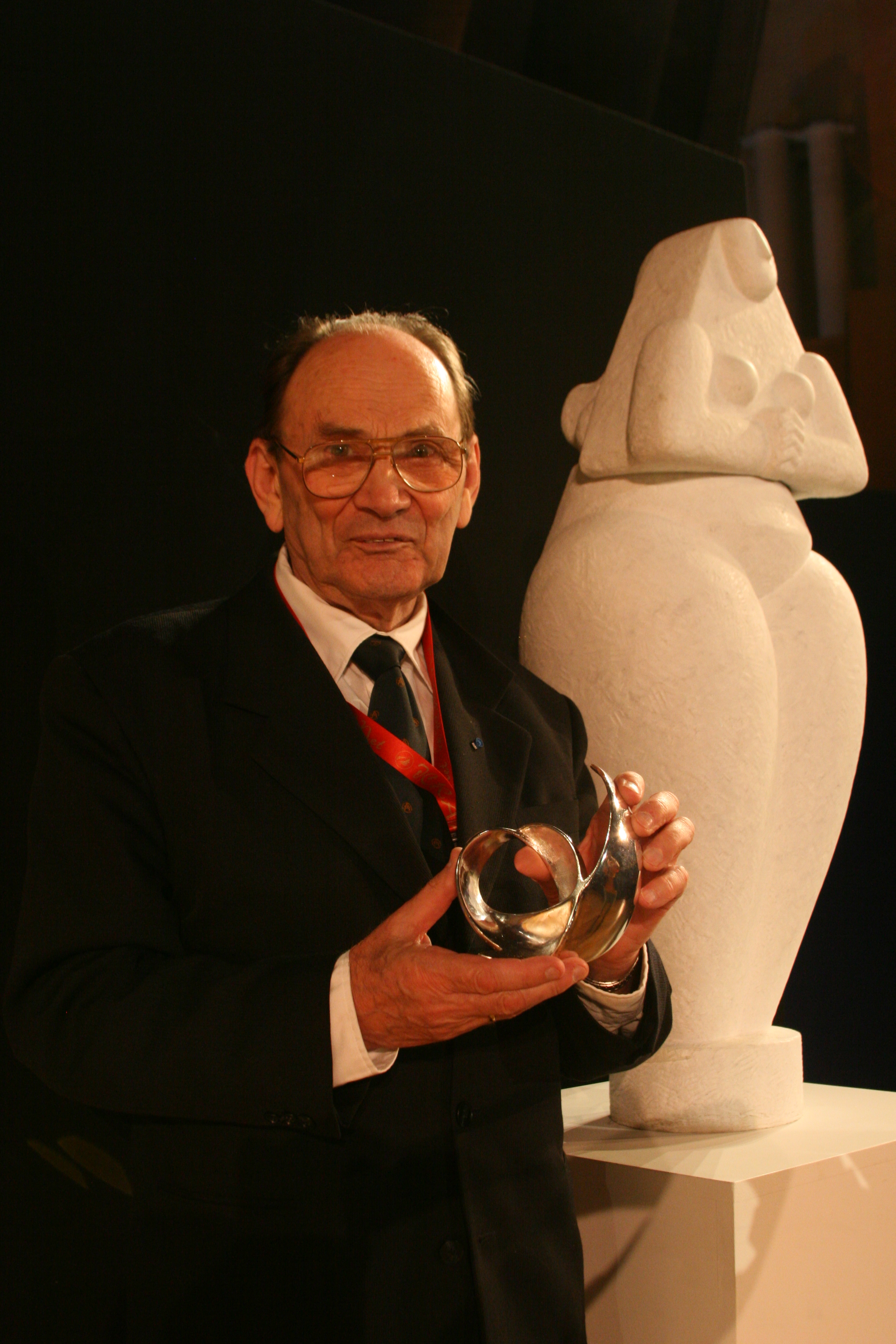
- Jaan Einasto with his Marcel Grossmann Award, 2009
- Born: Jaan Eisenschmidt; 23 February 1929 (age 97); Tartu, Estonia
- Education: University of Tartu (Ph.D., 1955)
- Known for: Pioneer in the branch of astronomy known as near-field cosmology
- Awards: Estonia National Science Award (1982, 1998, 2003, 2007); Marcel Grossmann Award (2009); Ambartsumian International Prize (2012); Gruber Prize in Cosmology (2014)
- Scientific career
- Fields: Cosmology

Jaan Einasto (born 23 February 1929) is an Estonian astrophysicist and one of the discoverers of the large-scale structure of the Universe.

== Family and early life ==
Born Jaan Eisenschmidt in Tartu, the name "Einasto" is an anagram of "Estonia" (it was chosen by his patriotic father in the 1930s to replace the family's German name).

Einasto married and had 3 children, 2 daughters and the youngest, a son. His daughter, Maret, is also an astrophysicist, who collaborates with her father.

== Education and career ==
He attended the University of Tartu, where he received the Ph.D. equivalent in 1955 and a senior research doctorate in 1972. From 1952, he has worked as a scientist at the Tartu Observatory (1977–1998) Head of the Department of Cosmology; from 1992–1995, he was Professor of Cosmology at the University of Tartu. For a long time, he was Head of the Division of Astronomy and Physics of the Estonian Academy of Sciences in Tallinn. Einasto is a member of the Academia Europaea, the European Astronomical Society and the Royal Astronomical Society; he has received three Estonian National Science Awards.

- 1947 Tartu Secondary School No. 1
- 1952 University of Tartu
- 1955 Cand.Sc. in physics and mathematics
- 1972 D.Sc. in physics and mathematics
- 1992 Professor

Since 1991 he is member of Academia Europaea. Since 1994 he is member of the Royal Astronomical Society.

In 1974, in a seminal work with Kaasik and Saar at the Tartu Observatory, Einasto argued that "it is necessary to adopt an alternative hypothesis: that the clusters of galaxies are stabilised by hidden matter." This was a key paper in recognizing that a hidden matter, i.e., dark matter, could explain observational anomalies in astronomy.

Einasto showed in 1977 at a Symposium in Tallinn (Estonia) that the universe has a cell structure, in which the observed matter surrounds huge empty voids.

== Awards, honours, legacy ==
The asteroid 11577 Einasto, discovered in 1994, is named in his honour.

The Einasto Supercluster, a galaxy supercluster discovered in 2024, is named in his honour.

== See also ==
- Einasto profile
- Vera Rubin - her discovery of "flat rotation curves" is the most direct and robust evidence of dark matter
