= Vladimir Belinski =

Russian theoretical physicist

- Владимир Белинский
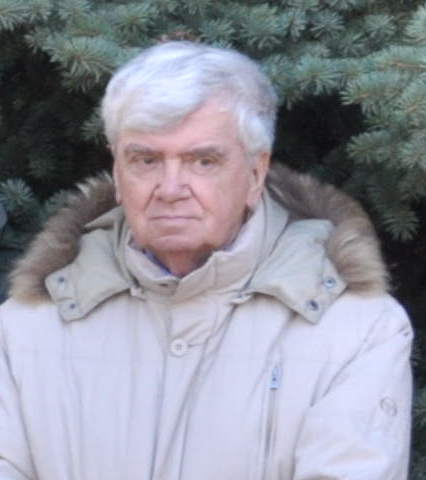
- Belinski in 2014
- Born: 26 March 1941 (age 85)
- Education: Moscow Engineering Physics Institute (MEPhI) - university Landau Institute for Theoretical Physics - PhD, D.Sc.
- Known for: BKL conjecture Gravitational solitons Inflationary attractor
- Scientific career
- Fields: Physics

Vladimir Alekseevich Belinski (last name is also spelled Belinsky, Russian: Владимир Алексеевич Белинский; born 26 March 1941) is a Russian and Italian theoretical physicist involved in research in cosmology and general relativity. He worked at Landau Institute for Theoretical Physics from 1968 to 1989 and got his Habilitation (Doctor of Sciences) degree at this Institute in 1980. As of 2016, he holds the permanent professor position at International Network of the Centers for Relativistic Astrophysics (ICRANet), Italy.

Belinski contributed to the editing of some chapters in Landau and Lifshitz's course of theoretical physics for volume 2. One of his most notable scientific contributions is BKL conjecture (Belinski—Khalatnikov—Lifshitz conjecture) on the behavior of generic solutions of Einstein field equations near a cosmological singularity. He co-invented the Belinski-Zakharov transform in 1978 showing that black holes are a special example of gravitational solitons. Another his notable result (obtained in 1985—1987 together with L. Grischuk, I. Khalatnikov and Ya. Zeldovich) is discovery of the "Inflationary Attractor". This is the unique solution of the gravitational equations with massive scalar field which solution has maximal degree of inflation and attract the majority of all other solutions forcing them to have the prolonged inflationary stages.

== Awards ==
- Landau Prize of the Russian Academy of Sciences (1974) "For set of works on singularities in Relativistic Cosmology"
- Marcel Grossmann Award (2012) "For the discovery of a general solution of the Einstein equations with a cosmological singularity of an oscillatory chaotic character known as the BKL singularity"
