= Riccardo Giacconi =

Italian-American astrophysicist (1931–2018)

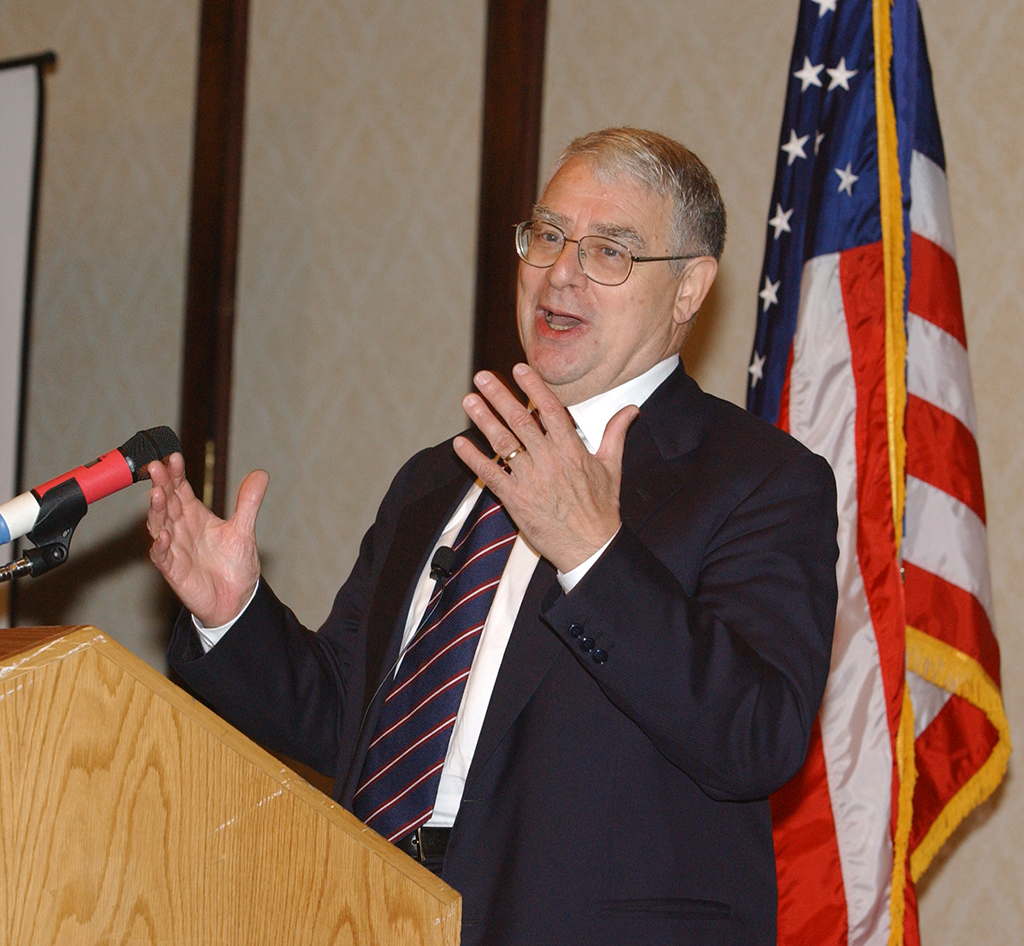
- Giacconi in 2003
- Born: 6 October 1931; Genoa, Kingdom of Italy
- Died: 9 December 2018 (aged 87); San Diego, California, U.S.
- Education: University of Milan
- Known for: Astrophysics
- Awards: Elliott Cresson Medal (1980); Dannie Heineman Prize for Astrophysics (1981); Wolf Prize in Physics (1987); Nobel Prize in Physics (2002)
- Scientific career
- Fields: Physics
- Workplaces: Johns Hopkins University; Chandra X-ray Observatory

Riccardo Giacconi (/dʒəˈkoʊni/ jə-KOH-nee, Italian: [rikˈkardo dʒakˈkoːni]; October 6, 1931 – December 9, 2018) was an Italian-American Nobel Prize-winning astrophysicist who laid down the foundations of X-ray astronomy. He was a professor at the Johns Hopkins University.

== Biography ==
Born in Genoa, Italy, Giacconi received his Laurea from the Physics Department of University of Milan before moving to the US to pursue a career in astrophysics research. In 1956, his Fulbright Fellowship led him to go to the United States to collaborate with physics professor R. W. Thompson at Indiana University.

Since cosmic X-ray radiation is absorbed by the Earth's atmosphere, space-based telescopes are needed for X-ray astronomy. Applying himself to this problem, Giacconi worked on the instrumentation for X-ray astronomy; from rocket-borne detectors in the late 1950s and early 1960s, to Uhuru, the first orbiting X-ray astronomy satellite, in the 1970s. Giacconi's pioneering research continued in 1978 with the Einstein Observatory, the first fully imaging X-ray telescope put into space, and later with the Chandra X-ray Observatory, which was launched in 1999 and is still in operation.

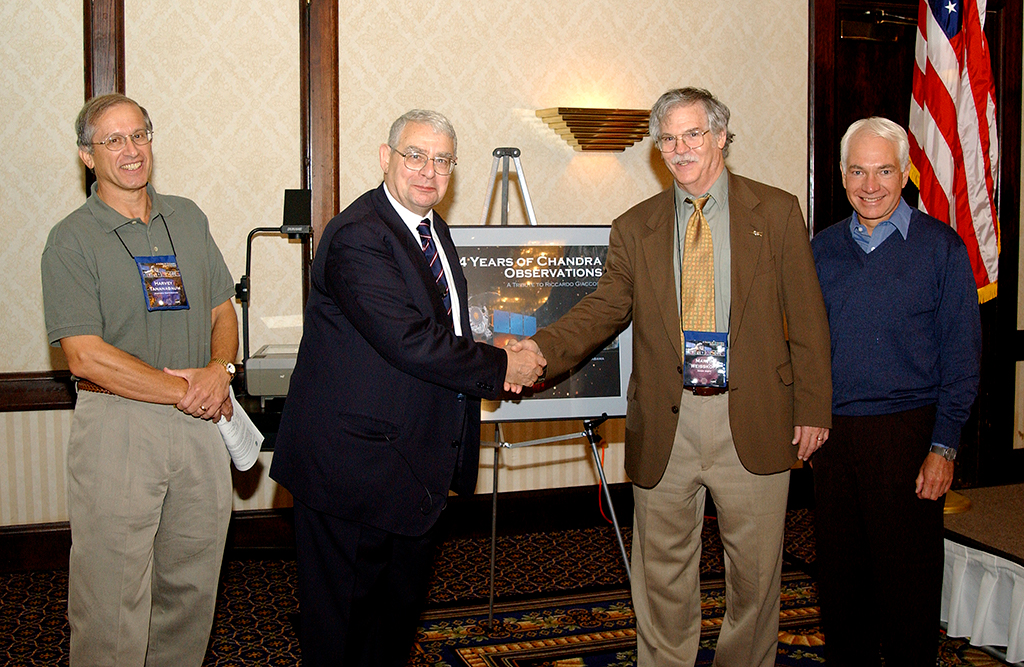
Harvey Tananbaum, Riccardo Giacconi, Martin C. Weisskopf (Chandra Project Scientist) and Claude R. Canizares (PI for one of Chandra's instruments)

Giacconi applied his expertise to other fields of astronomy, becoming the first permanent director (1981-1993) of the Space Telescope Science Institute (the science operations center for the Hubble Space Telescope). This was followed by Director General of the European Southern Observatory (ESO) from 1993 to 1999, overseeing the construction of the Very Large Telescope, then President of Associated Universities, Inc. (1999-2004) managing the early years of the ALMA array.

Giacconi was awarded a share of the Nobel Prize in Physics in 2002 "for pioneering contributions to astrophysics, which have led to the discovery of cosmic X-ray sources". The other shares of the Prize in that year were awarded to Masatoshi Koshiba and Raymond Davis, Jr. for neutrino astronomy.

Giacconi held the positions of professor of physics and astronomy (1982–1997) and research professor (from 1998 to his death in 2018) at Johns Hopkins University, and was a university professor. During the 2000s he was principal investigator for the major Chandra Deep Field-South project with NASA's Chandra X-ray Observatory. Giacconi died on December 9, 2018.

== Honors and awards ==
- Helen B. Warner Prize for Astronomy (1966)
- Member of the National Academy of Sciences (1971)
- Member of the American Academy of Arts and Sciences (1971)
- Bruce Medal (1981)
- Henry Norris Russell Lectureship (1981)
- Heineman Prize (1981)
- Gold Medal of the Royal Astronomical Society (1982)
- Wolf Prize in Physics (1987)
- Member of the American Philosophical Society (2001)
- Nobel Prize in Physics (2002)
- National Medal of Science (2003)
- Asteroid 3371 Giacconi
