= HHT =

HHT may refer to:

- Human-to-human transmission of infectious disease
- Headquarters and Headquarters Troop, in the U.S. Army
- Heinrich Hertz Submillimeter Telescope
- Heinrich-Hertz-Turm, in Hamburg, Germany
- Hereditary hemorrhagic telangiectasia, or Rendu-Osler-Weber disease
- Hilbert–Huang transform
- Hiphop Tamizha, an Indian musical duo
- Historic House Trust of New York City
- Historic Houses Trust, New South Wales
- Omega-hydroxypalmitate O-feruloyl transferase, an enzyme
- Howard Thompson (film critic), who wrote under the pen name HHT
