= Vatican Observatory =

Astronomical observatory of the Holy See

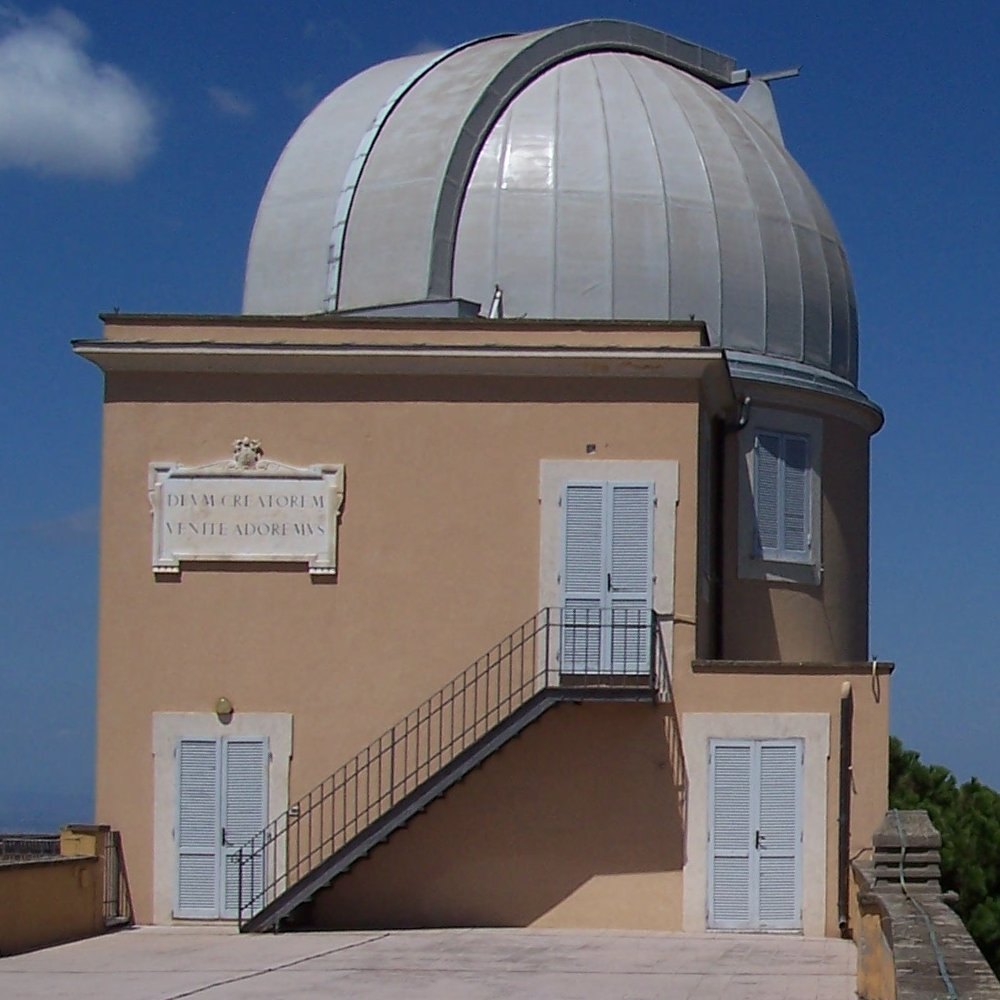
- Organization: Holy See
- Observatory code: 036
- Location: Castel Gandolfo, Metropolitan City of Rome Capital, Lazio, Italy
- Coordinates: 41°44′50″N 12°39′02″E
- Altitude: 430 m (1,410 ft)
- Established: 1930
- Website: www.vaticanobservatory.org/,%20https://www.vaticanobservatory.va/
- Location within Italy
- Related media on Commons

The Vatican Observatory (Italian: Specola Vaticana) is an astronomical research and educational institution supported by the Holy See. Originally based in the Roman College of Rome, the Observatory is now headquartered in Castel Gandolfo, Italy and operates a telescope at the Mount Graham International Observatory in the United States.

== History ==
The Church has had a long-standing interest in astronomy, due to the astronomical basis of the calendar by which holy days and Easter are determined. For instance, the Gregorian Calendar, promulgated in 1582 by Pope Gregory XIII, was developed by Aloysius Lilius and later modified by Christoph Clavius at the Collegio Romano from astronomical data. The Gregorian Tower was completed in 1580 for his purpose, designed by Bolognese architect Ottaviano Nonni.

In the 18th century, the Papacy actively supported astronomy, establishing the Observatory of the Roman College in 1774. In 1787–1789, the Specola Vaticana in the Tower of the Winds within the Vatican was established under the direction of Msgr. Filippo Luigi Gilii (1756–1821). When Msgr. Gilii died, the Specola was closed down because it was inconvenient for students in the city because the dome of St. Peter's obstructed its view. Its instruments were transferred to the College Observatory. A third facility, the Observatory of the Capitol, was operated from 1827 to 1870.

Father Angelo Secchi SJ relocated the College Observatory to the top of Sant'Ignazio di Loyola a Campo Marzio (Church of St. Ignatius in Rome). In 1870, with the capture of Rome, the College Observatory fell into the hands of the Italian Government. Out of respect for his work, however, Father Secchi was permitted to continue using the Observatory. After Secchi's death in 1878 the Observatory was nationalized by the Italian government and renamed the Regio Osservatorio al Collegio Romano ("Royal Observatory at the Roman College"), ending astronomical research in the Vatican.

In 1891, however, Pope Leo XIII issued a Motu proprio re-founding the Specola Vaticana (Vatican Observatory) and a new observatory was built on the walls at the edge of the Vatican. The new Vatican Observatory remained there for the next forty years.

In the late nineteenth-century the Vatican Observatory was part of a group of top astronomy institutions from around the world which worked together to create a photographic "Celestial Map" ("Carte du Ciel") and an "astrographic" catalog pinpointing the stars' positions. Italian astronomer Father Francesco Denza led the Vatican's contribution to the project until his death in 1894. In the early twentieth century, Father John Hagen took over the project and recruited a group of nuns from the Sisters of the Holy Child Mary to work on the necessary recording and calculations. The nuns, Sisters Emilia Ponzoni, Regina Colombo, Concetta Finardi and Luigia Panceri, helped map and catalog nearly half a million stars.

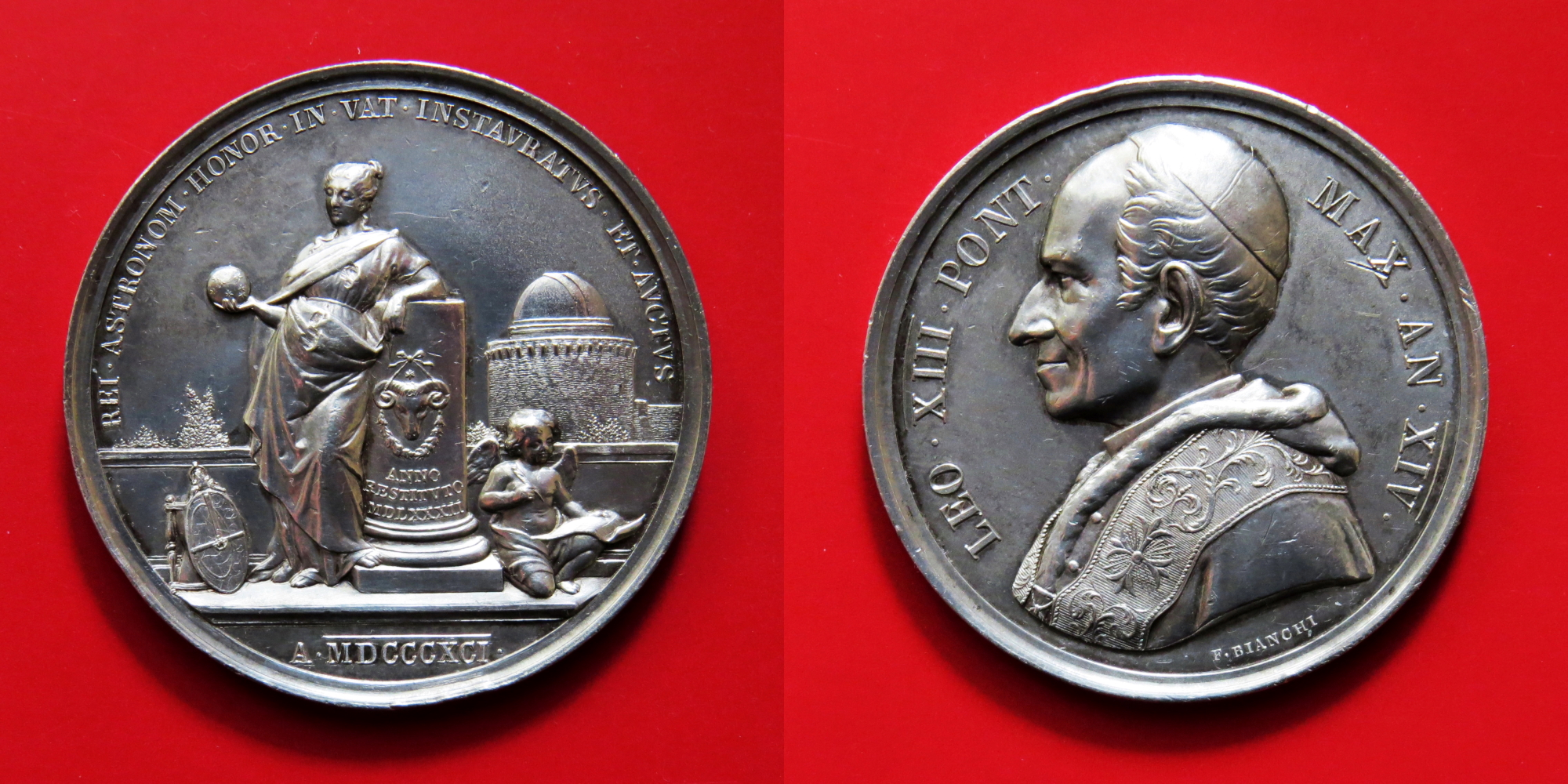
Silver medal celebrating the 1891 Pope Leo XIII's inauguration of the new observatory

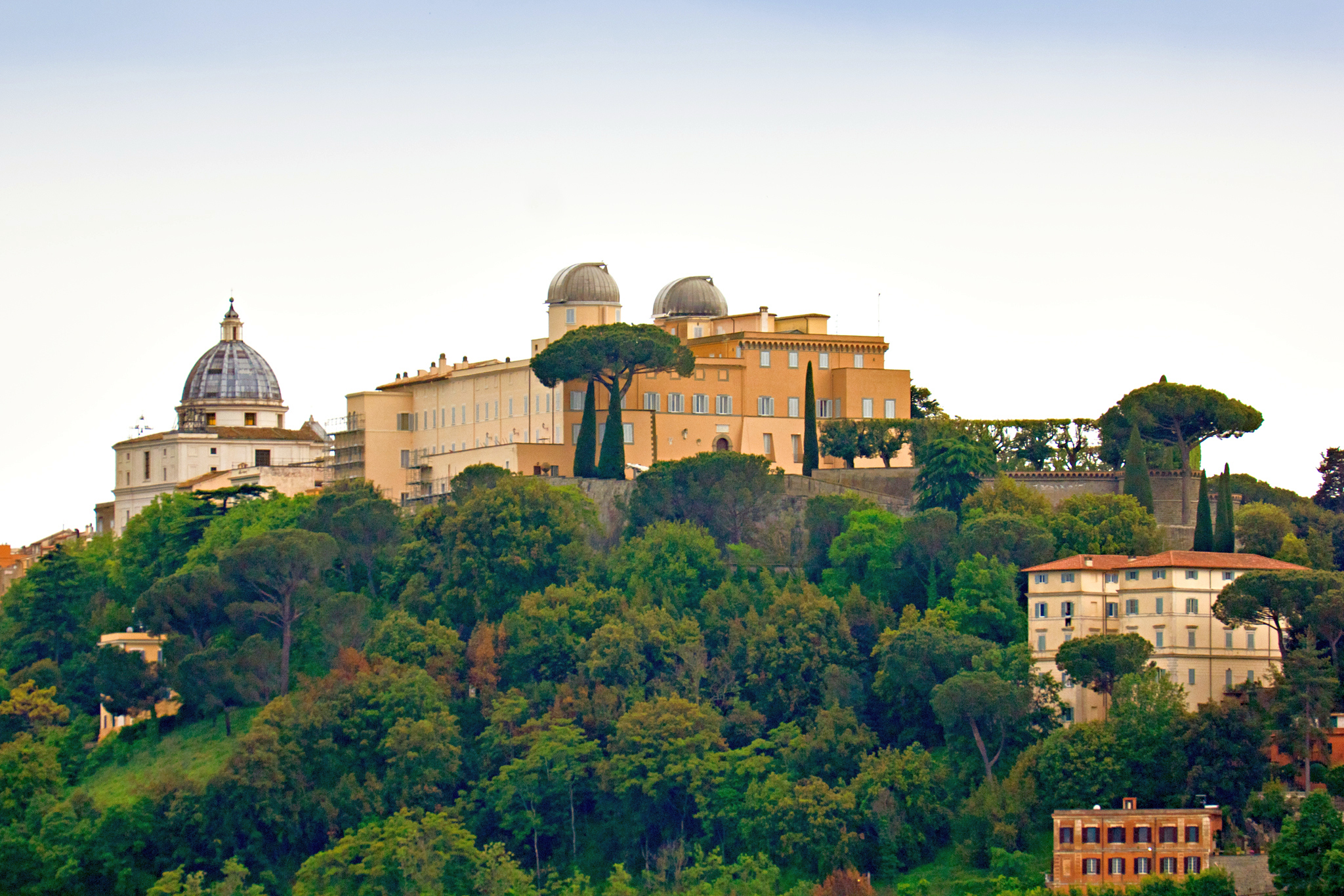
Vatican Observatory and pontifical palace, Castel Gandolfo

By the 1930s, the smoke and sky-glow of the city had made it impossible to conduct useful observations in Rome. Pope Pius XI relocated the Observatory to Castel Gandolfo, which is 25 kilometres (16 mi) southeast of Rome. By 1961, the same problems with light pollution made observing difficult at Castel Gandolfo. The Observatory then established the Vatican Observatory Research Group (VORG), with offices at the Steward Observatory of the University of Arizona in Tucson, Arizona.

D.K.J. O'Connell produced the first color photographs of a green flash at sunset in 1960. In 1993, VORG completed construction of the 1.8 metres (71 in) Vatican Advanced Technology Telescope, which is at Mount Graham near Safford, Arizona.

The Observatory's headquarters remain in Italy at Castel Gandolfo. In early 2008, the Vatican announced that the Observatory would be relocated to a former convent a mile away from the castle as part of a general reconstruction of the Papal residence. Its former space would be used to provide more room for the reception of diplomatic visitors. The old quarters in the castle were cramped and very poorly laid out for the Observatory's use. VORG research activities in Arizona continued unaffected.

Brother Guy Consolmagno was Director of the Observatory for ten years, from 2015 to 2025 and was replaced by Father Anthony D’Souza, S.J. on 19 September 2025.

== Locations and Equipment ==
=== Castel Gandolfo ===
In Castel Gandolfo, there are four observatory domes (“Specola”), two of which are located on the roof of the Papal Palace and two in the gardens of the Papal Palace. These instruments now only partially meet modern astronomical requirements.

The two wooden domes on the roof of the Papal Palace contain:

- Zeiss Double Astrograph, consisting of a refractor (aperture 40 cm, focal length 240 cm) and a reflecting telescope (aperture 60 cm, Newtonian focal length 200 cm), together with two finders and a guiding telescope, all rigidly mounted on the same polar axis. Conceived as the observatory’s main instrument, it was inaugurated in 1935.
- Zeiss visual refractor telescope (aperture 40 cm, focal length 600 cm), also inaugurated in 1935. Zeiss supplied a set of nine eyepieces and various accessories; the instrument was also equipped with a Graff photometer for observing variable stars and a micrometer for measuring double stars.

The two connected domes in the gardens of the Papal Palace contain:

- Carte du Ciel telescope, consisting of a double refractor (astrograph: aperture 33 cm, focal length 343 cm; collimator: aperture 20 cm, focal length 360 cm), which was acquired for the Vatican Observatory’s participation in the international Carte du Ciel project to create a photographic star atlas. The instrument was installed in 1891 on the Tower of St. John (part of the Leonine Wall) in the Vatican Gardens and was moved to Castel Gandolfo in 1942. The last photographic plates for the Carte du Ciel project were taken in 1953.
- Schmidt reflecting telescope by Hargreaves & Thomson (aperture 98 cm, focal length 240 cm), inaugurated in 1957.

=== Mount Graham ===
Since 1981, the Vatican Observatory has operated the Vatican Observatory Research Group at the University of Arizona, along with additional collaborations with other observatories, primarily in the United States. Since 1993, the Vatican Observatory Research Group has been associated with the VATT (Vatican Advanced Technology Telescope), an observatory with a 1.8-meter telescope located on Mount Graham in Arizona.

== People ==
=== Leadership ===
- Francesco Denza, B (1891–1894)
- Giuseppe Lais, CO (1894–1898)
- Ángel Rodríguez de Prada, OSA (1898-1905)
- Johann Georg Hagen, SJ (1906–1930)
- Johan Stein, SJ (1930–1951)
- Daniel Joseph Kelly O'Connell, SJ (1952–1971)
- Patrick Treanor, SJ (1971–1978)
- George Coyne, SJ (1978–2006)
- José Gabriel Funes, SJ (19 August 2006 – 18 September 2015)
- Guy Consolmagno, SJ (18 September 2015 –19 September 2025)
- Richard Anthony D’Souza, SJ (19 September 2025–present)

=== Other notable people ===
Prof Sister Natalia Zotov OP SFCC spent two summers at the observatory, the first woman to work there as an astronomer.

In 2008, the Templeton Prize was awarded to cosmologist Fr. Michał Heller, a Vatican Observatory Adjunct Scholar. In 2010, the George Van Biesbroeck Prize was awarded to former observatory director, the American Jesuit, Fr. George Coyne.

== See also ==
- Archaeoastronomy
- Catholic Church and science § Vatican Observatory
- Scientific Perspectives on Divine Action
- Vatican Advanced Technology Telescope
- List of astronomical observatories
- List of Jesuit sites
- Pietro Maffi
