= V346 Centauri =

Eclipsing binary

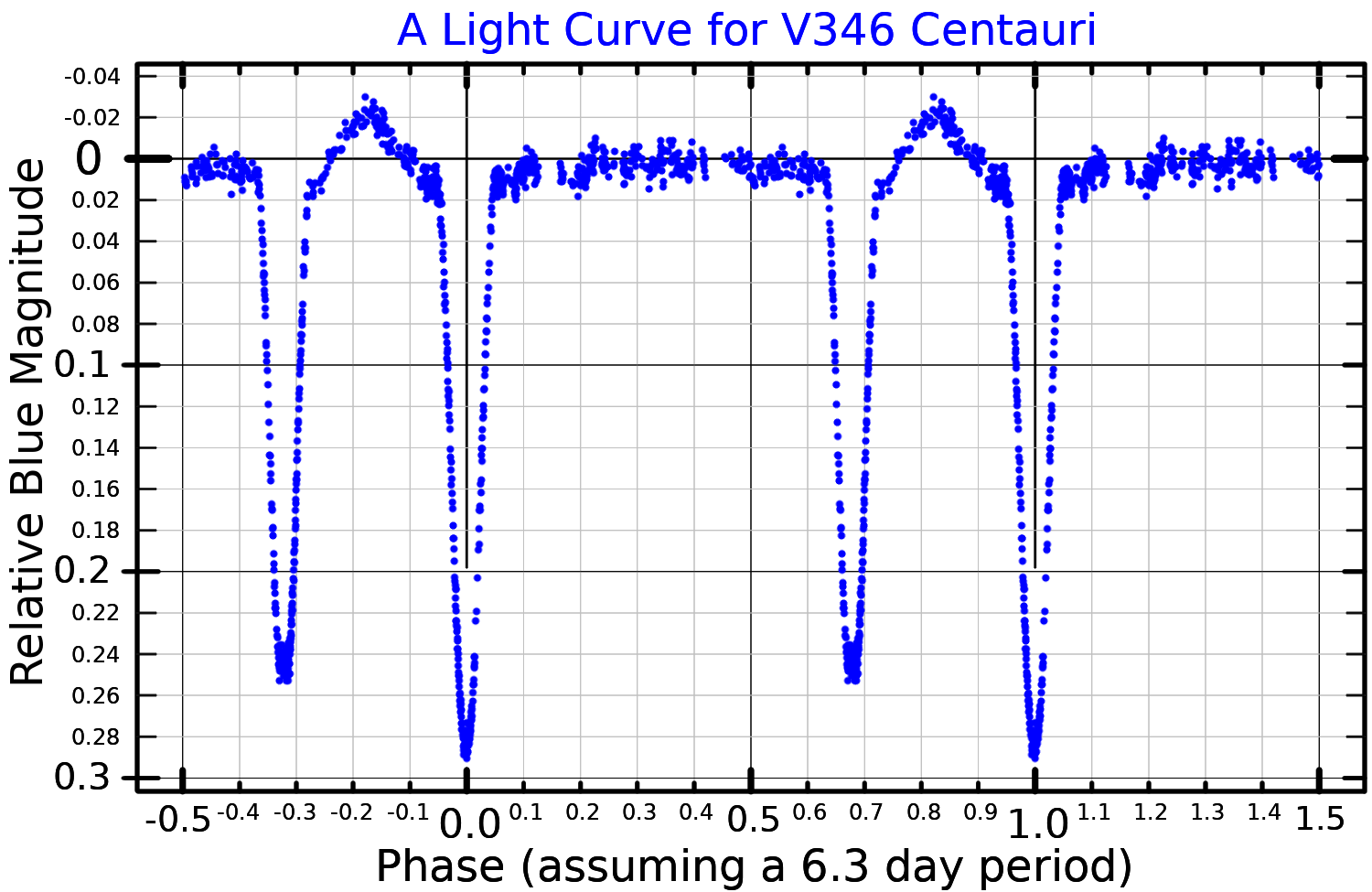
- A blue band light curve for V346 Centauri, adapted from van Genderen and Sterken (2007)

Observation data Epoch J2000 Equinox ICRS
- Constellation: Centaurus
- Right ascension: 11^{h} 42^{m} 49.67^{s}
- Declination: −62° 26′ 05.4″
- Apparent magnitude (V): 8.50 – 8.77 (8.72 + 10.38)

Characteristics
- Spectral type: B0.5IV + B2V
- Variable type: eclipsing binary (Algol)

Astrometry
Radial velocity (R_{v})	−6.4 km/s km/s
Proper motion (μ)	RA: −6.236 mas/yr Dec.: 0.758 mas/yr
Parallax (π)	0.4380±0.0261 mas
Distance	7,400 ± 400 ly (2,300 ± 100 pc)
Absolute magnitude (M_{V})	−3.91 + −2.14
Absolute bolometric magnitude (M_{bol})	−6.565 + −4.764

Orbit
Period (P)	6.321843 days
Semi-major axis (a)	39.358±0.094 R_{☉}
Eccentricity (e)	0.287
Inclination (i)	84.423±0.017°
Semi-amplitude (K_{1}) (primary)	136.46±0.43 km/s
Semi-amplitude (K_{2}) (secondary)	191.65±1.29 km/s

Details
Age	10^{+6}_{−4} Myr

Primary
Mass	12.00±0.07 M_{☉}
Radius	8.248±0.014 R_{☉}
Luminosity	33,574 L_{☉}
Surface gravity (log g)	3.684 cgs
Temperature	27,141 K
Rotational velocity (v sin i)	160.0 km/s

Secondary
Mass	8.47±0.10 M_{☉}
Radius	4.118±0.015 R_{☉}
Luminosity	6,391 L_{☉}
Surface gravity (log g)	4.137 cgs
Temperature	25,376±18 K
Rotational velocity (v sin i)	92.7 km/s

Other designations
- V346 Cen, CD−61°3158, HD 101837

Database references
SIMBAD	data

V346 Centauri is a variable star in the constellation Centaurus. An Algol-type eclipsing binary, its apparent magnitude has a maximum of 8.50, dropping to 8.77 during primary eclipse and to 8.72 during secondary eclipse, the latter being a total eclipse. From parallax measurements by the Gaia spacecraft, the system is located at a distance of about 2300 parsecs (7400 light-years), which is consistent with earlier estimates, based on its luminosity, of 2380 parsecs. The system is a confirmed member of the open cluster Stock 14, which contains many other young OB stars.

Both stars in the system are hot B-type stars, with spectral types of B0.5IV and B2V. The primary star shows signs of being evolved, while the secondary is still in the main sequence. In 1936, William O'Leary and Daniel Joseph Kelly O'Connell announced their discovery that the star, then known as CPD−61°2551, is a eclipsing binary star. It was given its variable star designation, V346 Centauri, later that same year. Due to the eclipsing and double-lined nature of the system, the physical elements of the stars can be determined with high precision. The primary star has a mass of 12 times the solar mass, radius of 8.3 times the solar radius, and an effective temperature of about 27,000 K. The secondary star is smaller and cooler, with 8.5 times the solar mass, 4.1 times the solar radius, and temperature of 25,000 K. In visible light, the primary contributes about 84% of the system's luminosity, while the secondary contributes the rest (16%). There is no evidence in the spectrum or the light curve for a third star in the system.

The average separation between the stars is about 39 solar radii. The orbit of the system has a moderate eccentricity of 0.287 and is inclined by 84.4° in relation to the plane of the sky. It displays apsidal precession with a period of 306±4 years, which means that the argument of periapsis has a cyclical variation with this period. The times of minimum light of the system indicate that the orbital period changed suddenly around the year 1965, decreasing from 6.322123 to 6.321843 days (a decrease of 24 seconds). The reason for this is unknown.
