= Erigeron heliographis =

Conservation status
- Critically Imperiled (NatureServe)

Scientific classification
- Kingdom: Plantae
- Clade: Tracheophytes
- Clade: Angiosperms
- Clade: Eudicots
- Clade: Asterids
- Order: Asterales
- Family: Asteraceae
- Genus: Erigeron
- Species: E. heliographis

Binomial name
- Erigeron heliographis G.L.Nesom

Species of flowering plant

Erigeron heliographis is a rare species of flowering plant in the family Asteraceae known by the common name Heliograph Peak fleabane. It is endemic to Arizona, where it occurs only in the Pinaleno Mountains in Graham County.

This perennial herb grows a few centimeters tall from a taproot and caudex. The rough-haired leaves are linear or lance-shaped and 1 to 4 centimeters long. The flower head contains 20 to 23 white ray florets 5 to 8 millimeters long.

This plant is known for two peaks in the Pinaleno Mountains of Arizona. It occurs at an elevation between 8500 and 10,400 feet, growing in rocky, forested habitat.
