= EP Aquarii =

Variable star in the constellation Aquarius

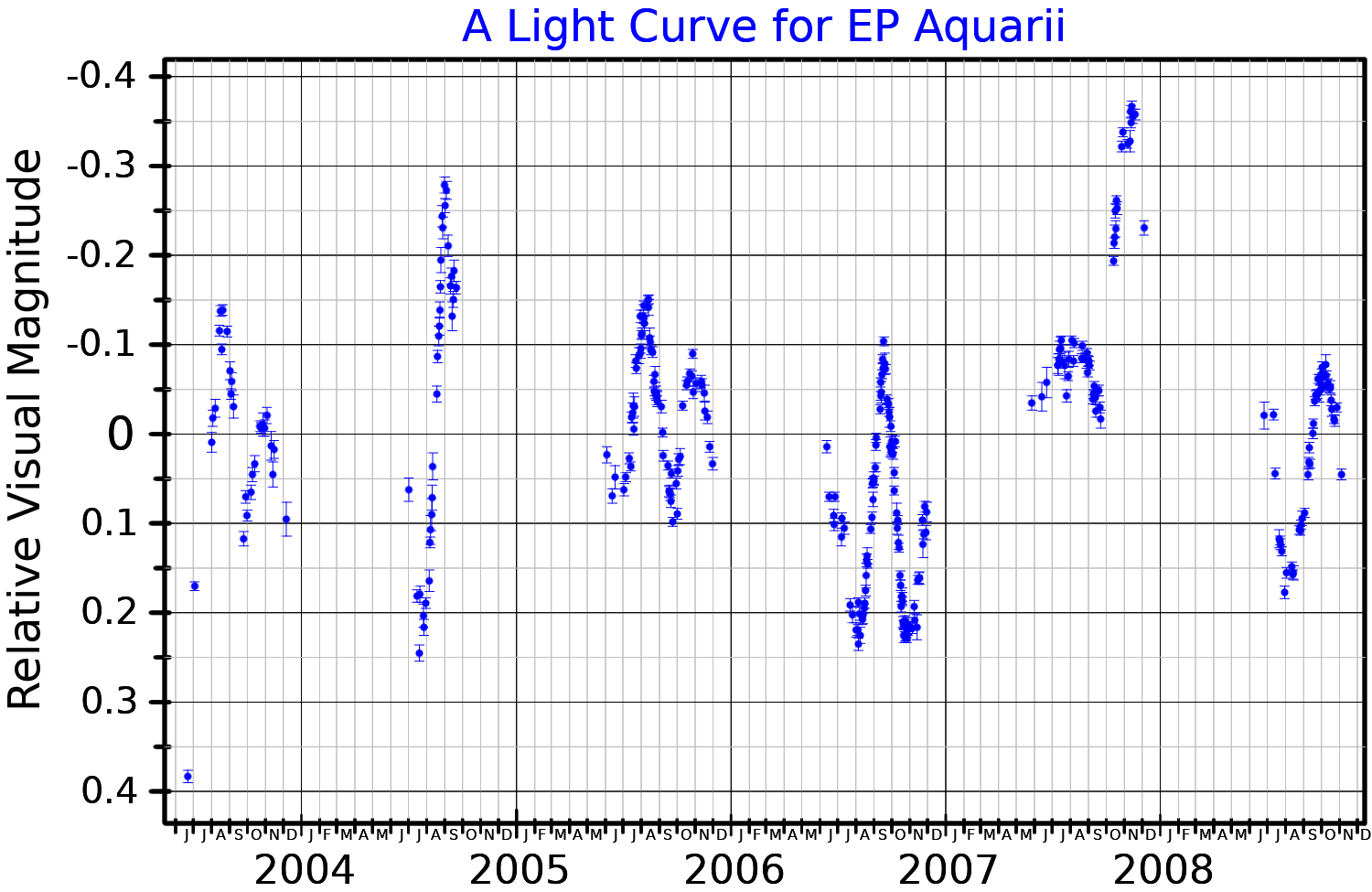
- A visual band light curve for EP Aqaurii, plotted from data published by Tabur et al. (2009)

Observation data Epoch J2000 Equinox ICRS
- Constellation: Aquarius
- Right ascension: 21^{h} 46^{m} 31.84949^{s}
- Declination: −02° 12′ 45.9285″
- Apparent magnitude (V): 6.37 - 6.82

Characteristics
- Evolutionary stage: AGB
- Spectral type: M8 III
- Variable type: SRb

Astrometry
Radial velocity (R_{v})	+33.98 km/s
Proper motion (μ)	RA: +25.547 mas/yr Dec.: +20.433 mas/yr
Parallax (π)	7.7134±0.4896 mas
Distance	420 ± 30 ly (130 ± 8 pc)

Details
Mass	1.7 M_{☉}
Radius	166 R_{☉}
Luminosity	4,800 L_{☉}
Surface gravity (log g)	−0.18 cgs
Temperature	3,200 K
Metallicity [Fe/H]	+0.50 dex

Other designations
- AAVSO 2141-02, BD−02°5631, FK5 3740, HD 207076, HIP 107516, SAO 145652

Database references
SIMBAD	data

EP Aquarii is a semiregular variable star in the equatorial constellation of Aquarius. At its peak brightness, visual magnitude 6.37, it might be faintly visible to the unaided eye under ideal observing conditions. A cool red giant on the asymptotic giant branch (AGB), its visible light brightness varies by about 1/2 magnitude over a period of 55 days. EP Aquarii has a complex circumstellar envelope (CSE), which has been the subject of numerous studies.

In 1877, John Birmingham published a set of ten magnitude estimates for EP Aquarii (number 596 on his list) made during the 1870s, which ranged from magnitude 6 to 8. He listed the star as "Variable (?)", although he also claimed to have observed "a quick change" in magnitude. Birminghan's magnitude range is far wider than the 6.37 to 6.82 range listed in the GCVS, nonetheless Birmingham's publication was cited as the reference when EQ Aquarii received its variable star designation in 1973.

The study of EP Aquarii's extended CSE began in 1984, when a spectral line arising from a rotational transition of carbon monoxide (CO) was detected by Zuckerman and Dyck, using the NRAO 12m telescope. In the early 1990s, analysis of the IRAS satellite data showed the presence of an extended dust shell surrounding the star, with a radius of about 1 lightyear. In the late 1990s, high spectral-resolution observations at the Caltech Submillimeter Observatory (CSO) showed that EP Aquarii's CO line profiles had an unusual shape that suggested the presence of two distinct stellar winds, expanding at dramatically different velocities: 1.4 and 11 km/sec. In the early 2000s, observations of the 21 cm line of atomic hydrogen at the Nançay Radio Observatory confirmed the presence of a large circumstellar shell with multiple velocity components.

The completion of Atacama Large Millimeter Array allowed EP Aquarii to be studied with far higher sensitivity and angular resolution than was available to earlier researchers. The very narrow emission feature (indicating an expansion rate of 1.4 km/sec) seen in the CSO spectra was found to arise from a spiral structure, nearly face-on to our line of sight, which suggested the presence of an unseen companion star. The higher velocity wind arises from a bi-conical outflow, the pole of which is roughly aligned to our line of sight.

Which chemical compounds are found in the CSEs of AGB stars is largely determined by whether or not the stellar atmosphere contains more carbon than oxygen. EP Aquarii's atmosphere contains more oxygen than carbon.
