= RS Cancri =

Variable star in the constellation Cancer

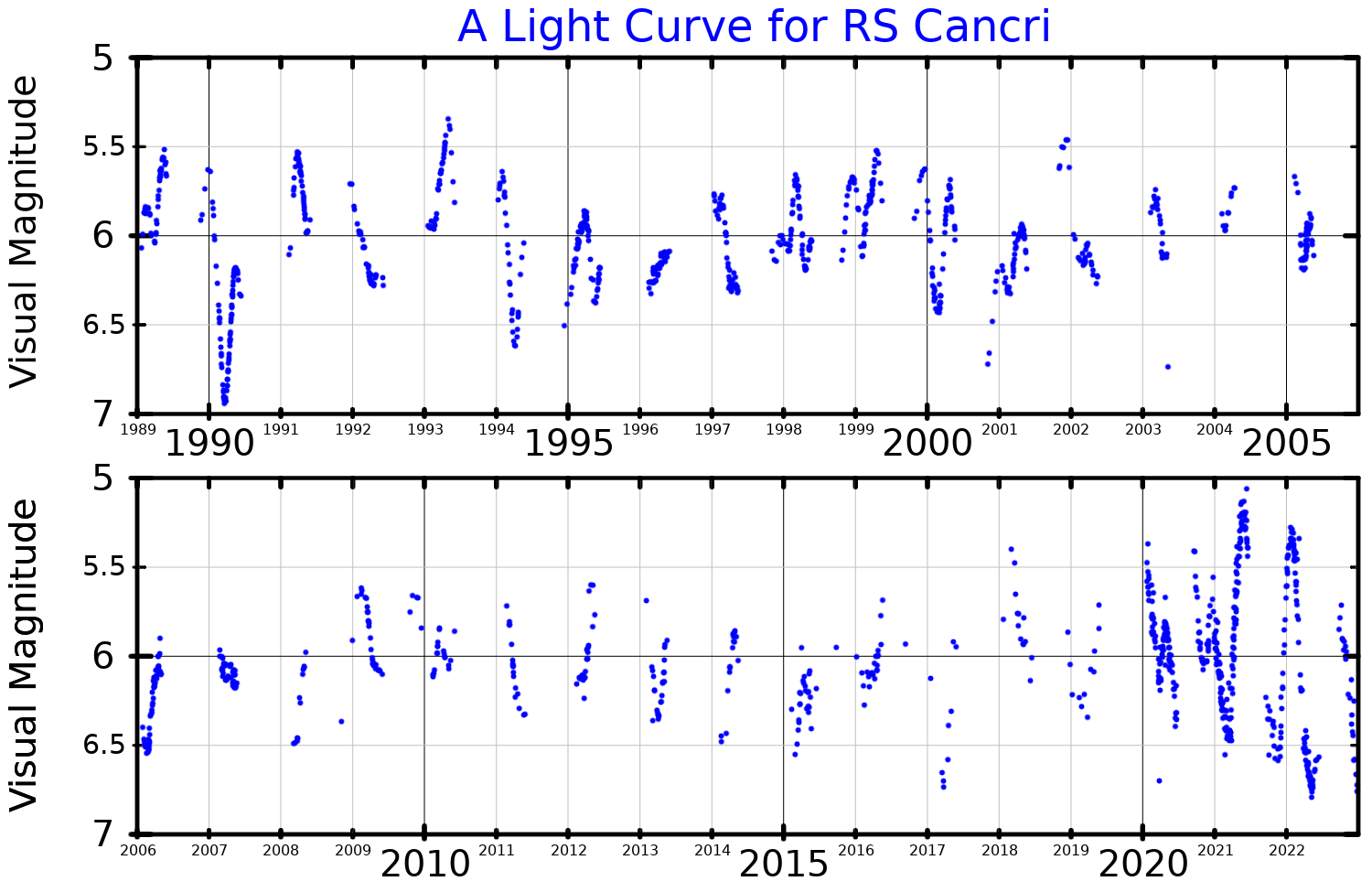
- A visual band light curve for RS Cancri, plotted from AAVSO data

Observation data Epoch J2000 Equinox J2000
- Constellation: Cancer
- Right ascension: 09^{h} 10^{m} 38.79702^{s}
- Declination: +30° 57′ 47.2911″
- Apparent magnitude (V): 5.4 - 7.3

Characteristics
- Evolutionary stage: AGB
- Spectral type: M6S
- Variable type: SRb

Astrometry
Proper motion (μ)	RA: −10.723±0.423 mas/yr Dec.: −33.822±0.360 mas/yr
Parallax (π)	6.6490±0.4946 mas
Distance	490 ± 40 ly (150 ± 10 pc)
Absolute magnitude (M_{V})	5.4 - 7.3

Details
Mass	3.0 M_{☉}
Radius	225 R_{☉}
Luminosity	4950 L_{☉}
Surface gravity (log g)	2.58 cgs
Temperature	3200 K
Metallicity [Fe/H]	−0.50 dex

Other designations
- HD 78712, HR 3639, HIP 45058, SAO 61306

Database references
SIMBAD	data

RS Cancri, also known as HR 3639 and HD 78712, is a star about 490 light years from the Earth in the constellation Cancer. It is a semiregular variable star, ranging in brightness from magnitude 5.4 to 7.3 over a period of about 229 days. During the time intervals when it is brighter than magnitude 6, it may be faintly visible to the naked eye of an observer far from city lights.

The variability of RS Cancri was discovered by Edward Pickering based upon 15 observations made in 1892 and 1898. S. Seliwanow derived a period of 129.5 days for the star, in 1923. In 2005, Saul Adelman and John Dennis found that the star showed two periods well determined by their data, 121.8±0.9 and 248±7 days, as well as a poorly-determined third period of about 500 days.

RS Cancri is an S-type star, on the asymptotic giant branch. Its spectrum shows technetium, implying the star has undegone the third dredge-up. RS Cancri has a stellar wind, and is losing mass at a rate of 1.7 × 10^{−7} solar masses per year.

RS Cancri has a circumstellar shell. It is a good target for studies of such a shell, because its rather high galactic latitude (+42 degrees) means that it is cleanly separated from the interstellar dust and gas seen along most lines of sight through the galactic plane. Dust within the shell produces far-infrared continuum emission that was resolved by IRAS. Both atomic and molecular gas within the shell are also measurably extended, and have been mapped.

The extensive molecular envelope surrounding RS Cancri was first detected in 1977, by Kwok-Yung (Fred) Lo and Kenneth Bechis, who used the 36 foot radio telescope on Kitt Peak to detect the J=1-0 line of carbon monoxide (CO). Years later, when observations of spectral lines could be made with more sensitive equipment, it was noticed that the shapes of the spectral lines suggested that RS Cancri has two distinct stellar wind components, expanding into space at different speeds. Interferometric observations have shown that the two winds consist of a ~2 km/sec wind arising from an equatorial disk within the envelope, and an ~8 km/sec bipolar wind. In subsequent decades, additional molecules such as SiO, SO, SO_{2}, H_{2}O HCN and PN have been detected.
