= Guy Consolmagno =

American Jesuit research astronomer (born 1952)

Brother Guy J. Consolmagno SJ
- Br Guy Consolmagno at the telescopes of the Vatican Observatory
- Born: September 19, 1952 (age 74); Detroit, Michigan, U.S.
- Education: M.I.T. (S.B. 1974, S.M. 1975); University of Arizona (Ph.D. 1978)
- Awards: St. Albert Award (2022)
- Scientific career
- Fields: Planetary science
- Thesis: Electromagnetic processes in the evolution of the solar nebula (1978)
- Doctoral advisor: J.R. "Randy" Jokipii

Brother Guy J. Consolmagno, SJ (born September 19, 1952), is an American research astronomer, physicist, Jesuit, and retired director of the Vatican Observatory, and president of the Vatican Observatory Foundation.

== Life ==
Consolmagno attended the University of Detroit Jesuit High School before he obtained his S.B. (1974) and S.M. (1975) degrees at Massachusetts Institute of Technology and his Ph.D. (1978) at the University of Arizona's Lunar and Planetary Laboratory, all in planetary science. After postdoctoral research and teaching from 1978 to 1980 at Harvard College Observatory and from 1980 to 1983 at MIT, in 1983 he joined the US Peace Corps to serve in Kenya for two years, teaching astronomy and physics. After his return he took a position as Assistant Professor at Lafayette College in Easton, Pennsylvania.

In 1989 he entered the Society of Jesus, and took vows as a brother in 1991. On entry into the order, he was assigned as an astronomer to the Vatican Observatory, where he also served as curator of the Vatican Meteorite collection until his appointment as Foundation president in 2014. In addition to his continuing professional work in planetary science, he has also studied philosophy and theology.

His research is centered on the connections between meteorites and asteroids, and the origin and evolution of small bodies in the Solar System. In addition to over 70 refereed scientific papers, he has co-authored several books on astronomy for the popular market, which have been translated into multiple languages. During 1996, he took part in the Antarctic Search for Meteorites, ANSMET, where he discovered a number of meteorites on the ice fields of Antarctica. An asteroid was named in his honour by the International Astronomical Union, IAU in 2000 - 4597 Consolmagno.

He believes in the need for science and religion to work alongside one another rather than as competing ideologies. In 2006, he said, "Religion needs science to keep it away from superstition and keep it close to reality, to protect it from creationism, which at the end of the day is a kind of paganism – it's turning God into a nature god." Consolmagno was the chair of the Division for Planetary Sciences of the American Astronomical Society, serving from October 2006 to October 2007. In 2025 he began a two year term as president of The Meteoritical Society.

Consolmagno is a popular speaker as well as a writer of popular science. He has been a guest of honor at several science fiction conventions, including DucKon in 2000, ConFusion in his native state of Michigan in 2002, Boskone in 2007, ConClave in 2009, MuseCon in 2015, and Minicon and NASFiC in 2017. He was an invited participant in Scifoo in 2008 as well. He taught at Fordham University in New York City for the fall term of 2008. Consolmagno gave the keynote speech at the 2013 Stellafane amateur telescope making convention on Aug 10. He appeared on The Colbert Report in December 2009 to promote his book, The Heavens Proclaim. In May 2014, Consolmagno received an honorary doctorate (Doctor of Humane Letters, Honoris Causa) from Georgetown University and spoke at the Georgetown College commencement ceremony. In 2010, he was a guest on On Being with Krista Tippett, alongside his friend and colleague Father George Coyne, S.J. In the interview, Consolmagno and Coyne discussed their distinct and intimate relationships with science and faith. The show aired for a second time in 2011, and for a third time in September 2015.

On July 2, 2014, he was awarded the Carl Sagan Medal for outstanding communication by an active planetary scientist to the general public by the Division for Planetary Sciences of the American Astronomical Society.

Known as the "pope's astronomer," he was named by Pope Francis to be the director of the Vatican Observatory in September 2015.

In 2022, Consolmagno was awarded the St. Albert Award by the Society of Catholic Scientists.

Consolmagno additionally has made several appearances on EWTN's original programming, most notably featuring prominently in the August 2021 EWTN Vaticano special episode "Inside the Vatican Observatory - Where Science Meets Faith."

== Bibliography ==
- Worlds Apart (with Martha W. Schaefer, Prentice Hall, 1993)
- Turn Left at Orion (with Dan M. Davis, Cambridge University Press, 1989)
- The Way to the Dwelling of Light (University of Notre Dame Press, 1998)
- Brother Astronomer, Adventures of a Vatican Scientist (McGraw Hill, 2000)
- Intelligent Life in the Universe? Catholic belief and the search for extraterrestrial intelligent life (Catholic Truth Society, 2005)
- God's Mechanics: How Scientists and Engineers Make Sense of Religion (Jossey-Bass, 2007)
- The Heavens Proclaim: Astronomy and the Vatican (Vatican Observatory Publications, 2009)
- Would You Baptize an Extraterrestrial?: ...and Other Questions from the Astronomers' In-box at the Vatican Observatory (with Paul Muller, Crown Publishing Group, 2014)
- Lecture, From Galileo to Laudato Si’: Why Science Needs Faith, Linda Hall Library, March 29, 2017.
- Finding God in the Universe (Fortress Press, 2022)
- A Jesuit’s Guide to the Stars, (Loyola Press, 2025)

== See also ==
- List of Jesuit scientists
- List of Roman Catholic scientist-clerics

Catholic Church titles
Preceded by José Gabriel Funes	Director of the Vatican Observatory; 2015 - 2025	Succeeded by Richard Anthony D’Souza
