= Pinaleño Mountains =

Mountain range in southeastern Arizona, United States

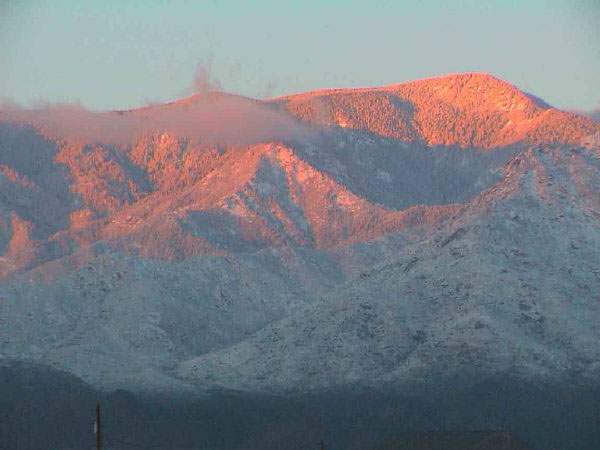

Highest point
- Peak: Mount Graham
- Elevation: 10,720 ft (3,270 m)
- Coordinates: 32°42′05″N 109°52′18″W

Geography
- Country: United States
- State: Arizona

The Pinaleño Mountains (in Yavapai: Walkame—"pine mountains" or in Western Apache: Dził Nnilchí' Diyiléé—"pine-burdened mountain") are a remote mountain range in southeastern Arizona, near Safford (Ich'į' Nahiłtį́į́), Arizona. The mountains have over 7,000 feet (2,100 m) of vertical relief, more than any other range in the state. The mountains are surrounded by the Sonoran-Chihuahuan Desert. Subalpine forests cover the higher elevations. According to The Nature Conservancy, they traverse five ecological communities and contain "the highest diversity of habitats of any mountain range in North America." The highest point is Mount Graham (Western Apache: Dził Nchaa Sí'an—"Big Seated Mountain") at 10,720 feet (3,267 m). Locals often refer to the whole mountain range as "Mount Graham", in which case the peak is referred to as "High Peak". The mountains cover 300 square miles (780 km^{2}) and are part of the Coronado National Forest, Safford ranger district.

The Pinaleño/Pinal Band (Spanish term: "Pinery People", Western Apache: Tiis Ebah Nnee—"Cottonwoods Gray in the Rocks People") of the San Carlos Apache (Tsékʼáádn—"Metate People"), one of the subgroups of the Western Apache people and their kin and close allies, the Hwaalkamvepaya/Walkamepa Band ("Pine Mountains People") of the Guwevkabaya/Kwevkepaya ("Southern People"), one of the three Yavapai regional groupings were either named after the Pinaleño Mountains or the mountains were named after them (both people used this range as primary source for pine nuts, which have long been a staple food for many Native American tribes).

The mountains are a Madrean sky island range that is typical of southern Arizona, specifically south-central Arizona, and especially the complete southeastern quadrant of Arizona, from Tucson, and Globe to Nogales, Douglas, and the Chiricahuas. Sky island ranges are mountains isolated by desert valleys. The deserts, as well as differences in elevation, prevent flora and fauna from traveling to or from nearby ecosystems. As a result, the mountain ecosystems are isolated, and distinct subspecies can develop. This is similar to what Charles Darwin discovered with species he collected from different islands in the Galápagos, a discovery that played a major role in his theory of natural selection. The Mount Graham red squirrel is an isolated population of red squirrels and possibly a subspecies as well.

Safford and Willcox, Arizona are the nearest towns to the Pinaleños.

== Flora and fauna ==
The diversity of the flora and fauna in the Pinaleños make them an especially notable range. Trees that grow there include: Douglas fir, Engelmann spruce, quaking aspen, Ponderosa pine, silverleaf oaks (south-facing slopes), box elder, and bigtooth maple. Frequently seen animals include mule deer, Coue's white tail deer, hawks, and black bear. The Mount Graham red squirrel was once considered to be extinct, but was "rediscovered" in the 1970s and as of June 3, 1987, is officially listed as endangered.

=== Pre-Columbian flora ===
Unlike many of the other mountains in the area, the Pinaleños have no lava deposits. The lava-based mountains found throughout Arizona tend to be barren, whereas the Pinaleños (and others) have a large number of trees, including many that pre-date Columbus's arrival in the Americas. "Researchers from the University of Arizona Tree Ring Laboratory have discovered living trees that date back to 1257 and 1270 AD. Botanists say the Douglas firs have survived because the rocky cliffs of the mountains have served as a fire barrier for them. The scientists also found dead firs that dated as far back as 1102 AD."

== Climate ==
Columbine is a Remote Automated Weather Station in the Pinaleño Mountains, located on Mount Graham near the Columbine Corrals Campground. At an elevation of 9521 ft (2902 m), Columbine has a humid continental climate (Köppen Dfb), but the climate transitions to a subalpine climate (Köppen Dfc) at higher elevations, nearer the peak of Mount Graham.

Climate data for Columbine (RAWS), Arizona, 1992–2020 normals: 9521ft (2902m)
Month	Jan	Feb	Mar	Apr	May	Jun	Jul	Aug	Sep	Oct	Nov	Dec	Year
Record high °F (°C)	66 (19)	65 (18)	68 (20)	72 (22)	81 (27)	84 (29)	86 (30)	81 (27)	79 (26)	73 (23)	69 (21)	71 (22)	86 (30)
Mean maximum °F (°C)	58.9 (14.9)	56.5 (13.6)	58.8 (14.9)	63.6 (17.6)	70.6 (21.4)	78.7 (25.9)	79.3 (26.3)	76.0 (24.4)	72.6 (22.6)	67.4 (19.7)	63.0 (17.2)	59.1 (15.1)	79.6 (26.4)
Mean daily maximum °F (°C)	42.8 (6.0)	41.7 (5.4)	45.9 (7.7)	51.7 (10.9)	60.2 (15.7)	69.9 (21.1)	70.1 (21.2)	68.4 (20.2)	64.3 (17.9)	56.6 (13.7)	48.9 (9.4)	42.3 (5.7)	55.2 (12.9)
Daily mean °F (°C)	31.6 (−0.2)	31.3 (−0.4)	35.7 (2.1)	40.4 (4.7)	48.6 (9.2)	57.1 (13.9)	59.0 (15.0)	57.5 (14.2)	53.4 (11.9)	45.2 (7.3)	37.7 (3.2)	31.4 (−0.3)	44.1 (6.7)
Mean daily minimum °F (°C)	20.4 (−6.4)	20.8 (−6.2)	25.4 (−3.7)	29.0 (−1.7)	36.5 (2.5)	44.2 (6.8)	48.0 (8.9)	46.5 (8.1)	42.4 (5.8)	33.9 (1.1)	26.6 (−3.0)	20.4 (−6.4)	32.8 (0.5)
Mean minimum °F (°C)	5.3 (−14.8)	6.9 (−13.9)	11.4 (−11.4)	16.9 (−8.4)	25.2 (−3.8)	33.8 (1.0)	41.4 (5.2)	40.8 (4.9)	33.4 (0.8)	22.5 (−5.3)	12.1 (−11.1)	3.9 (−15.6)	0.6 (−17.4)
Record low °F (°C)	−11 (−24)	−14 (−26)	2 (−17)	10 (−12)	18 (−8)	29 (−2)	31 (−1)	34 (1)	24 (−4)	11 (−12)	3 (−16)	−6 (−21)	−14 (−26)
Source: XMACIS2

== Heliograph station ==
Heliograph Peak was home to a 19th-century heliograph station.

During General Nelson Miles' mid-1880s campaign against the Apaches led by Geronimo, a U.S. Signal Corps officer named Colonel William A. Glassford established an innovative signal system. Atop mountain peaks throughout southeastern Arizona and southwestern New Mexico, soldiers manned stations using mirrors, or heliographs, to flash messages across great distances. Heliograph Peak, as one of the highest mountains in southeast Arizona, served as one of the peaks in that system. Miles cornered Geronimo in 1886 and had him sent into exile in Florida. the Apache scouts that had helped defeat Geronimo were also sent into exile along with him because of questions about their loyalty. Shortly thereafter, the heliograph system was abandoned along with a number of forts used in the Apache campaign.

== Civilian Conservation Corps ==
The Civilian Conservation Corps (CCC) completed many projects in the 1930s. "Men from all over the country came to the area to work in numerous camps, several located on Mount Graham." Treasure Park and Columbine were used during the summer months, and Arcadia, Noon Creek and other sites were used during the winter months. "Many of the improvements at campgrounds, as well as hiking trails, roads and other facilities now enjoyed by many visitors to Mount Graham, were built by the CCC personnel."

One of their projects included the construction of a 99-foot (30 m) steel framed lookout tower on Heliograph Peak to watch for fires in the Pinaleños and nearby mountain ranges including the Galiuros, Dos Cabezas, White Mountains, Gilas, Rincons and Santa Catalinas. The tower still stands as of 2006, however, most fire watching efforts in Arizona are conducted from the ground or by airplane.

== 2004 fire ==
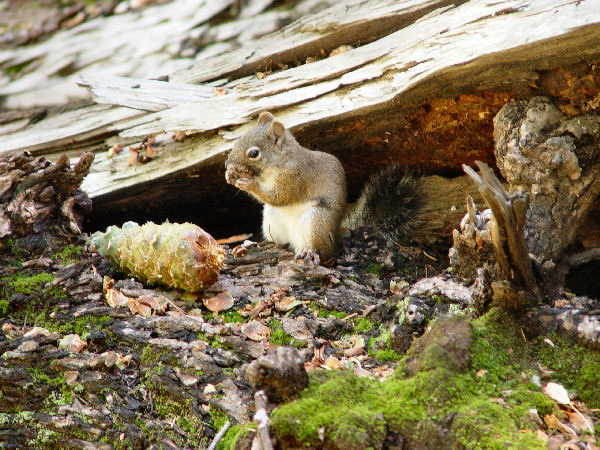
The Mount Graham Red Squirrel is possibly an endemic (found nowhere else) subspecies, found only in the Pinaleños. The squirrel was a focal point of a controversy related to installing the observatory on Mount Graham.

In the summer of 2004 the Nuttall Complex Fire burned over 30,000 acres (12,000 ha) in the Pinaleños. Monsoon rains helped firefighters in their efforts. The firefighting cost over $8.5 million and engaged over 800 firefighters. "Crews were able to prevent the fire from damaging the Mount Graham International Observatory and the cabins. There were only two structures damaged by the fires. A historic fire lookout was partially burned, and an electronic equipment storage shack was damaged Tuesday when the Gibson fire hit Heliograph Peak."

Arizona's Governor Janet Napolitano visited the area at the time of the fire. "This is a big, major fire, and it concerns us all," she said. Regarding her aerial tour, the governor said, "The fire looks a lot better today than it did a week ago. I flew over Mount Graham on July 4 and all I could see was smoke. Now, I can clearly see the perimeters the firefighters have been burning." Napolitano provided for inmate wildland fire crews to provide fire suppression and forest thinning services.

== Fragile ecosystem ==
Because the Pinaleños are a sky island mountain range, they are by definition unique. The U.S. Forest Service claims that "prior to about 1870, the Pinaleños maintained healthy, resilient ecosystems that were adapted to naturally occurring fire regimes (primarily frequent, low-intensity wildfires)." They go on to explain that "After European settlement, the natural ecosystem processes were interrupted by passive (overgrazing) and active fire suppression, and harvest of large-diameter trees. The result is that today the forests are composed of overly dense, small-diameter trees and snags with excessive amounts of downed wood. The composition of the mixed-conifer forest between about 8,500 and 10,000 feet (3,000 m) elevation has shifted from fire-adapted to fire-intolerant tree species."

=== Potential threats from global climate change ===
Because they are a fragile eco-system, even small climate changes can have a profound effect. With potentially larger climate changes underway, the ecology of the Pinaleños could be threatened. This is the interpretation of the Forest Service. In particular some view the fires of 2004 as an event possibly driven in part by global warming. The agency states that "global climate change and drought are helping to poise the Pinaleños for epidemic insect or disease outbreaks and catastrophic, stand-replacing fires. Indeed, both of these events have taken place in recent years. The flora and fauna have not evolved to tolerate these new conditions or catastrophic events, so there is a need to use silvicultural management and prescribed burning to begin to restore the natural balance in the remaining forests and woodlands."

== Mount Graham Observatory ==
Sitting atop the highest mountain in the Pinaleños is Mount Graham International Observatory (MGIO), a division of the Steward Observatory primarily maintained by the University of Arizona. The observatory is home to some of the most sophisticated astronomical instruments and telescopes in the world.

=== Large Binocular Telescope Controversy ===
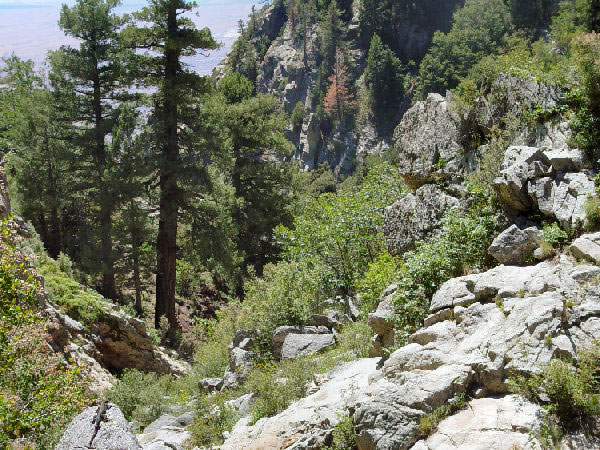
A view of steep, southwestern-facing slopes of the Pinaleños from near Hospital Flat and Treasure Park.

The Large Binocular Telescope (LBT) is a large optical telescope that uses two 8.4 m (330 inch) wide mirrors. It saw first light with one mirror on October 12, 2005 and with both mirrors on January 11, 2008.

Construction of the LBT was authorized by the United States Congress in 1988. There were two sources of controversy related to the telescope.

First, some Native Americans consider the site to be sacred. They argued that it was unacceptable to deface the sacred mountains with an additional telescope.

Second, some environmentalists worried that construction of the site would adversely affect the endangered population of the Mount Graham Red Squirrel. The Mount Graham subspecies was thought to have been extinct in the 1950s, but small numbers of squirrels were "rediscovered" in the 1970s. The squirrel was added to the federal endangered species list in 1987 by the U.S. Fish and Wildlife Service, when the estimated population in 1986 was fewer than 400. The Mount Graham subspecies has been isolated from other subspecies of red squirrels since the end of the Pleistocene glacial periods. It is still rather unclear if the Mt. Graham red squirrel is distinct or not from red squirrels elsewhere. Studies on genetic data are in progress.

Astronomers and other personnel working at the site have faced protests, threats of physical violence, and attempts at sabotage on the mountain. As a result of this conflict, a "squirrel permit" must be obtained by anyone visiting the observatory at a facility towards the base of the mountain.

== Swift Trail ==
The Swift Trail (Arizona Route 366) is a modern highway making the Pinaleños very accessible. The road is 36 miles (58 km) long with 23 paved miles plus 13 miles (21 km) of graded dirt. In the course of an afternoon you can experience climate zones you would see in a drive from Mexico to Canada. This switchbacking mountain road was named for T. T. Swift, the first supervisor of the Coronado National Forest. Initially just a trail, the route has been improved many times. Two notable eras of improvent came in the 1930s and the 1990s. The Arizona Department of Transportation celebrated the latest improvements on June 30, 1992.

== Peaks of the Pinaleños ==
1. Mount Graham 10,720 ft (3,270 m) (other sources say Mount Graham is 10,713 ft (3,265 m) high).
2. Hawk Peak 10,627 ft (3,239 m)
3. Plain View Peak 10,370 ft (3,160 m)
4. Heliograph Peak 10,022 ft (3,055 m)
5. Merrill Peak 9,288 ft (2,831 m)
6. Ladybug Peak 8,780 ft (2,680 m)
7. Greasewood Mountain 7,094 ft (2,162 m)

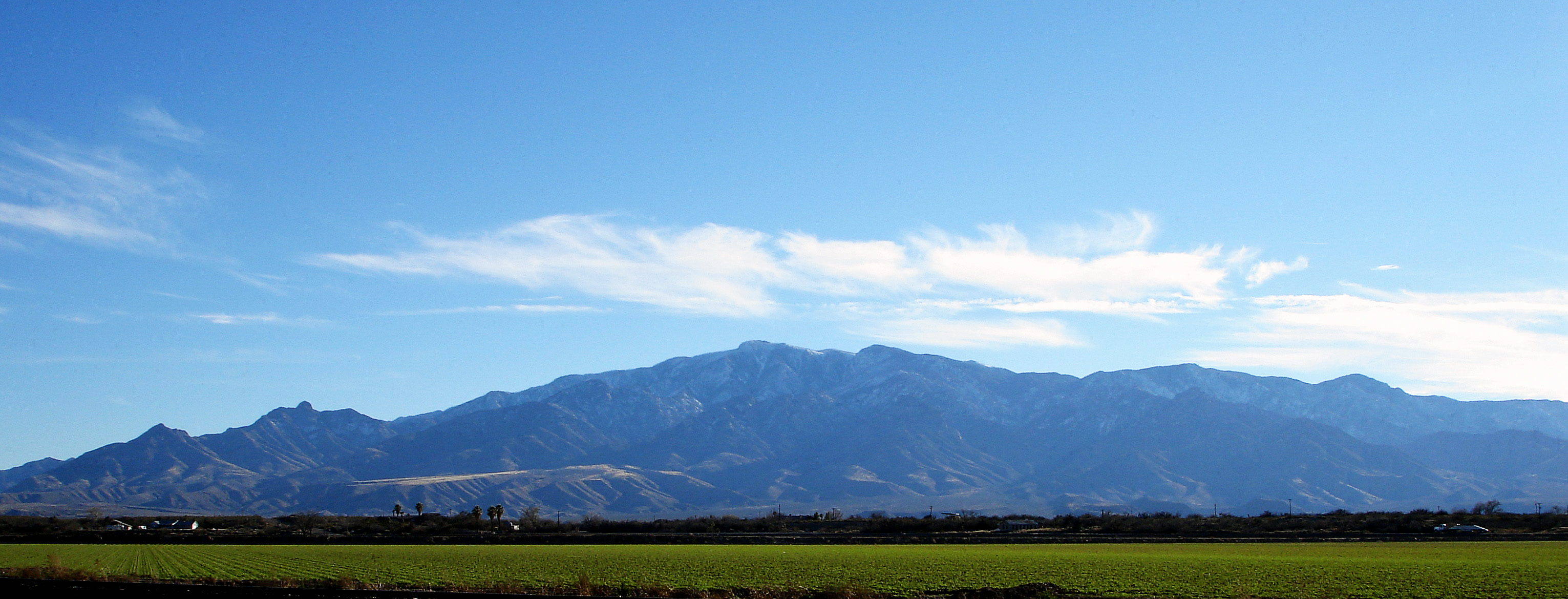
