= Francesco Denza =

Italian meteorologist and astronomer (1834–1894)

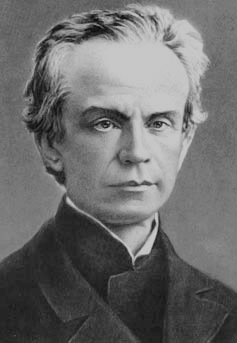
- Born: 7 June 1834; Naples, Kingdom of Naples
- Died: 14 December 1894 (aged 60); Rome, Kingdom of Italy
- Education: University of Turin
- Scientific career
- Fields: Astronomy; Meteorology

Francesco Denza (7 June 1834 – 14 December 1894) was an Italian meteorologist and astronomer.

== Biography ==
Francesco Denza was born on 7 June 1834 in Naples. He joined the Barnabites at the age of sixteen, and during his theological course at Rome studied at the same time meteorology and astronomy under Angelo Secchi. From 1856 until 1890 he was attached to the Barnabite college at Moncalieri where he became widely known for his work in meteorology, a science which he advanced not merely by his personal observations and studies but also by the interest which he roused in it throughout Italy. In 1859 Denza founded the Bullettino mensile di Meteorolgia (Monthly Bulletin of Meteorology), which was continued until 1894, and established a meteorological observatory at Moncalieri; it was largely through his influence that similar observatories, more than 200 in number, were gradually built in various parts of Italy. The success which attended his efforts gave him a national reputation, and in 1866 Senator Matteucci and Signor Berti, minister of public instruction, urged him to take charge of the department of meteorology at Florence. Denza did not accept the post, but in the following year, at Berti's invitation, he read a paper on meteors at the "Instituto Superiore" in Florence.

In 1872 he began a series of researches on terrestrial magnetism with special reference to magnetic declination, which illness, however, prevented him from completing. In 1883 the Duke of Aosta invited him to take charge of the scientific education of his three sons. In the same year he was director of the literary and scientific section of the National Exposition at Turin and chairman of its jury of awards. He represented Leo XIII in 1884 at the Congress of Scientific Societies of France, presiding over the meteorological section. He visited England and the Netherlands on this occasion. He likewise represented the pope at the Paris astronomical congress of 1887, when the plan was formulated of making a photographic map of all the stars in the heavens down to the fourteenth magnitude; through his influence the Vatican Observatory was one of the eighteen chosen to carry out this important project. Denza was appointed director of the Vatican Observatory in September 1890, and thenceforth lived at the Vatican. Here he inaugurated the work of this observatory in stellar photography. At the time of his death, which was due to apoplexy, he was President of the Accademia dei Nuovi Lincei.

== Published works ==
- Meteore cosmiche in Scienza di popolo (Milan, 1869);
- Stelle cadente del periodo di Agosto 1868 (ibid.);
- Le aurore pol. d. 1869 ed i fonom. cosmiche che accompagnarono (1869);
- Distribuzione di pioggia in Italia (1871–72);
- Valeurs de l'électricité et l'ozone à Moncalieri à l'époque du choléra in Comptes Rendus (1868) LXVI;
- Le armonie dei cieli, Nozioni di astron. (1881);
- Amplitudes d'oscillations diurn. magnet. à Moncalieri 1880–81;
- Osserv. di declin. magnet. ad Aosta, Moncalieri e Firenze in occas. d'eclisse sol 26/5 1873 in Proc. Acc. dei Nuov. Lincei.

== See also ==
- List of Roman Catholic scientist-clerics

== Bibliography ==
- Cites:
  - Civiltà cattolica, Ser. 16 (1895), I, 93, 94;
  - Kneller, Karl Alois (1904). Das Christentum u. die Vertreter der neueren Naturwissenschaft. Freiburg.
- Monaco, Giuseppe (1990). "DENZA, Francesco". Dizionario Biografico degli Italiani (in Italian). Vol. 38: Della Volpe–Denza. Rome: Istituto dell'Enciclopedia Italiana. ISBN 978-88-12-00032-6.
