= GRB 070125 =

Gamma-ray burst in constellation Gemini

- Event type: Gamma-ray burst
- Constellation: Gemini
- Other designations: GRB 070125

GRB 070125 is a gamma-ray burst (GRB) that was observed on January 25, 2007, by the InterPlanetary Network, which lasted for around 70 seconds. It is unique in that it did not occur in a galaxy, but in intergalactic space. This is unusual, since they are caused by the hypernovae of young massive stars, which usually means having to reside in a galaxy, as almost all stars are formed in galaxies, particularly high mass ones. It has a redshift of 1.55, which equals to a light travel distance of 9.5 billion years.

It is theorized that the star formed in the tidal tail resulting from the interaction of two nearby galaxies, deep in intergalactic space.

A month after it was detected, the Large Binocular Telescope observed a 26th magnitude optical afterglow from the gamma ray burst.
