= Steward Observatory =

Observatory in Tucson, Arizona (US)

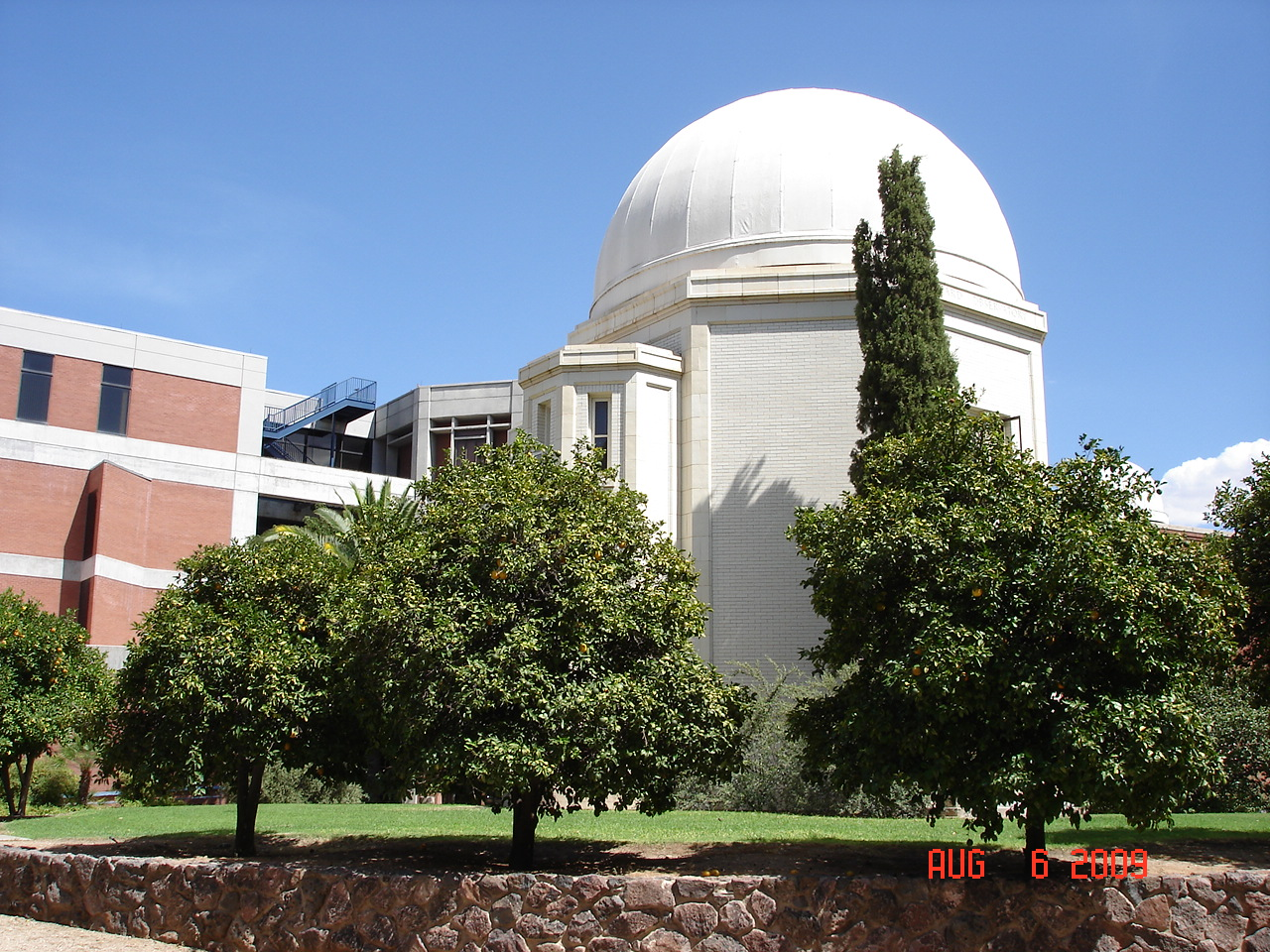
- The observatory on the campus of the University of Arizona in Tucson
- Organization: University of Arizona
- Observatory code: 692
- Location: Tucson, Arizona
- Coordinates: 32.2333°N 110.9490°W
- Altitude: 792 meters (2,598 ft)
- Established: 1916
- Website: Steward Observatory

Telescopes
- Mount Graham: 10 m Submillimeter Telescope; 1.8 m VATT; 2 x 8.4 m Large Binocular Telescope
- Catalina Station: 1.6 m Kuiper Telescope; 0.7 m Schmidt camera
- Mount Lemmon: 1.5 m NASA Telescope; 1.0 m telescope
- Kitt Peak: ARO 12m Radio Telescope; 2.3 m Bok Telescope; 1.8 m Spacewatch telescope 0.9 m Spacewatch telescope Super-LOTIS
- Mount Hopkins: 6.5 m MMT
- Related media on Commons

Steward Observatory is the research arm of the Department of Astronomy at the University of Arizona. Its offices are located on the Arizona campus in Tucson, Arizona (US). Established in 1916, the first telescope and building were formally dedicated on April 23, 1923. It operates, or is a partner in telescopes at five mountain-top locations in Arizona, one in New Mexico, one in Hawaii, and one in Chile. It has provided instruments for three different space telescopes and numerous terrestrial ones. Steward has one of the few facilities in the world that can cast and figure the very large primary mirrors used in telescopes built in the early 21st century.

== History ==
Steward Observatory owes its existence to the efforts of American astronomer and dendrochronologist Andrew Ellicott Douglass. In 1906, Douglass accepted a position as Assistant Professor of Physics and Geography at the University of Arizona in Tucson, Arizona. Almost immediately upon his arrival in Tucson, Douglass established astronomical research programs using an 8-inch refracting telescope on loan from the Harvard College Observatory and actively began to pursue funding to construct a large research-class telescope in Tucson. Over the next 10 years, all of Douglass’ efforts to secure funding from the University and the Arizona Territorial (and later State) Legislatures ended in failure. During this time period, Douglass served UArizona as Head of the Dept. of Physics and Astronomy, Interim President, and finally Dean of the College of Letters, Arts, & Sciences.

Then on October 18, 1916, University President Rufus B. von KleinSmid announced that an anonymous donor had given the University $60,000 “…to be used to buy a telescope of huge size.” That donor was later revealed to be Mrs. Lavinia Steward of Oracle, Arizona. Mrs. Steward was a wealthy widow who had an interest in astronomy and a desire to memorialize her late husband, Mr. Henry Steward. Douglass made plans to use the Steward gift to construct a 36-inch diameter Newtonian reflecting telescope. The Warner & Swasey Company of Cleveland, Ohio was contracted to build the telescope, but the United States entry into World War I delayed the contract since Warner & Swasey had war contracts that took priority. The situation was further delayed by the fact that up until this time, the expertise in large telescope mirror making was in Europe. The war made it impossible to contract with a European company. So Douglass had to find an American glass company that was willing to develop this expertise. After a couple of failed castings, the Spencer Lens Co. of Buffalo, New York ultimately produced a 36-inch mirror for the Steward Telescope.

The telescope was finally installed in the observatory building in July 1922, and the Steward Observatory was officially dedicated on April 23, 1923. In his dedication address, Douglass recounted the trials and tribulations of establishing the observatory, then gave the following eloquent justification for the scientific endeavor:

In concluding I wish to leave with you a more general view. This installation is to be devoted to scientific research. Scientific research is business foresight on a large scale. It is knowledge obtained before it is needed. Knowledge is power, but we cannot tell which fact in the domain of knowledge is the one which is going to give the power, and we therefore develop the idea of knowledge for its own sake, confident that some one fact or training will pay for all the effort. This I believe is the essence of education wherever such education is not strictly vocational. The student learns many facts and has much training. He can only dimly see which fact and which training will be of eminent use to him, but some special part of his education will take root in him and grow and pay for all of the effort which he and his friends have put into it. So it is with the research institutions. In this Observatory I sincerely hope and expect that the boundaries of human knowledge will be advanced along astronomical lines. Astronomy was the first science developed by our primitive ancestors thousands of years ago because it measured time. Performing that same function, it has played a vast part in human history, and today it is telling us facts, forever wonderful, about the size of our universe; perhaps tomorrow it will give us practical help in showing us how to predict climatic conditions in the future.

== Observatories ==
Steward Observatory manages three different observing locations in southern Arizona: Mount Graham International Observatory (MGIO), Mount Lemmon Station, and Catalina Station on Mount Bigelow. It also operates telescopes at two additional important observatories: Kitt Peak National Observatory (KPNO) and Fred Lawrence Whipple Observatory on Mount Hopkins. Steward is a partner in the Sloan Digital Sky Survey-III, which is located in New Mexico at Apache Point Observatory. Steward used to maintain a student observatory on Tumamoc Hill approximately 5 kilometers (3.1 mi) west of the campus, but that is no longer in operation. The original observatory dome in Tucson now houses the Ray White Jr. 21-inch telescope and is used for public outreach and undergraduate education.

The Arizona Radio Observatory, a part (sub-unit) of Steward Observatory, operates the SMT 10m diameter millimeter-wavelength radio telescope on Mount Graham and UArizona 12m diameter millimeter-wavelength radio telescope on Kitt Peak.

Steward Observatory participates in many partnered projects. It is a full member in the twin Magellan Telescopes located at Las Campanas Observatory in northern Chile. It is also a member in organizations that originated two projects planned for same region: the Large Synoptic Survey Telescope, now the Vera Rubin Observatory, and the Giant Magellan Telescope, a next generation extremely large telescope. The Richard F. Caris Mirror Laboratory completed the primary and tertiary mirrors for LSST and is fabricating the primary mirror segments, each 8.4m in diameter, for the GMT.

== Research groups ==
The Richard F. Caris Mirror Lab, located under the east side of Arizona Stadium, has pioneered new techniques of large mirror production, including spin-casting lightweight honeycomb mirrors in a rotating furnace, and stressed-lap polishing. The Mirror Laboratory completed the second mirror for the Large Binocular Telescope in September, 2005. The Mirror Lab also cast the 8.4 meter diameter primary/tertiary mirror for the Vera C. Rubin Observatory, and has cast the central mirror and five of the seven off-axis primary mirrors for the Giant Magellan Telescope.

The Infrared Detector Laboratory built the Near Infrared Camera and Multi-Object Spectrometer (NICMOS) instrument for the Hubble Space Telescope and the Multiband Imaging Photometer (MIPS) instrument for the Spitzer Space Telescope. For the James Webb Space Telescope, Steward built the Near-Infrared Camera (NIRCam) and helped build the Mid-IR Instrument (MIRI).

Other groups include the Center for Astronomical Adaptive Optics (CAAO), the Imaging Technology Laboratory (ITL), the Steward Observatory Radio Astronomy Laboratory (SORAL), the Earths in Other Solar Systems (EOS) group, and the Astrochemistry/Spectroscopy Laboratory.

== Gallery ==
Kuiper telescope image of Plutonian system

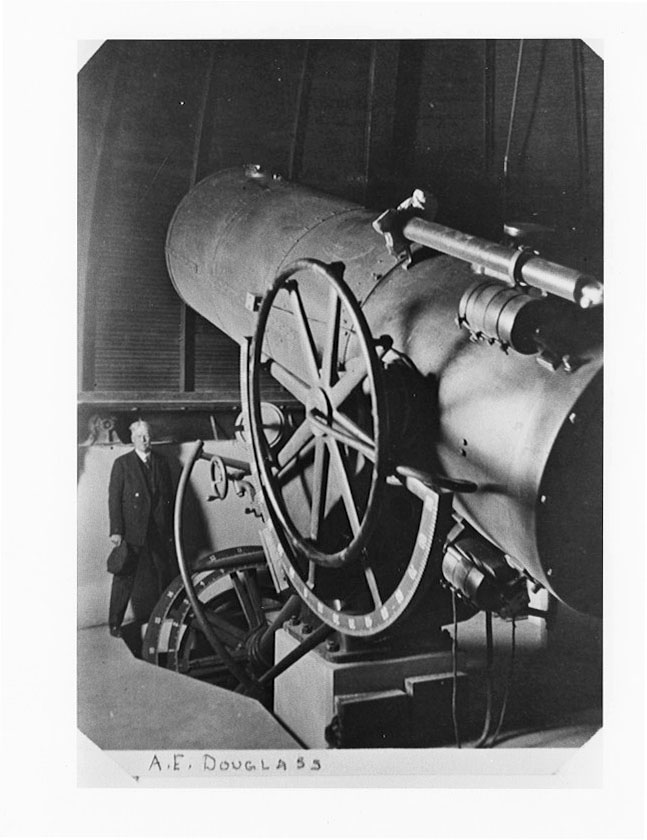
36-inch telescope in 1922 (in 1963 moved to Kitt Peak)

== See also ==
- Lowell Observatory
- List of astronomical observatories
