= ARGOS (optics system) =

Multi-star optics system

Advanced Rayleigh Guided Ground Layer Adaptive Optics System (ARGOS) is a multi-star adaptive optics system which is built for use with the Large Binocular Telescope (LBT). With ARGOS, both sides of the LBT will be equipped with a multi-laser beacon system and corresponding wavefront sensors. The artificial beacons are created by Rayleigh scattering the Earth's atmosphere using high power pulsed green lasers. The purpose of ARGOS is to generate six artificial laser guides stars to correct the ground layer turbulence above the LBT mirrors. This will decrease the distortions induced by the atmospheric turbulence, and therefore the imaging and spectroscopic capability of LUCIFER, the LBT spectrograph.
