= Mount Graham International Observatory =

Observatory in Graham County, Arizona

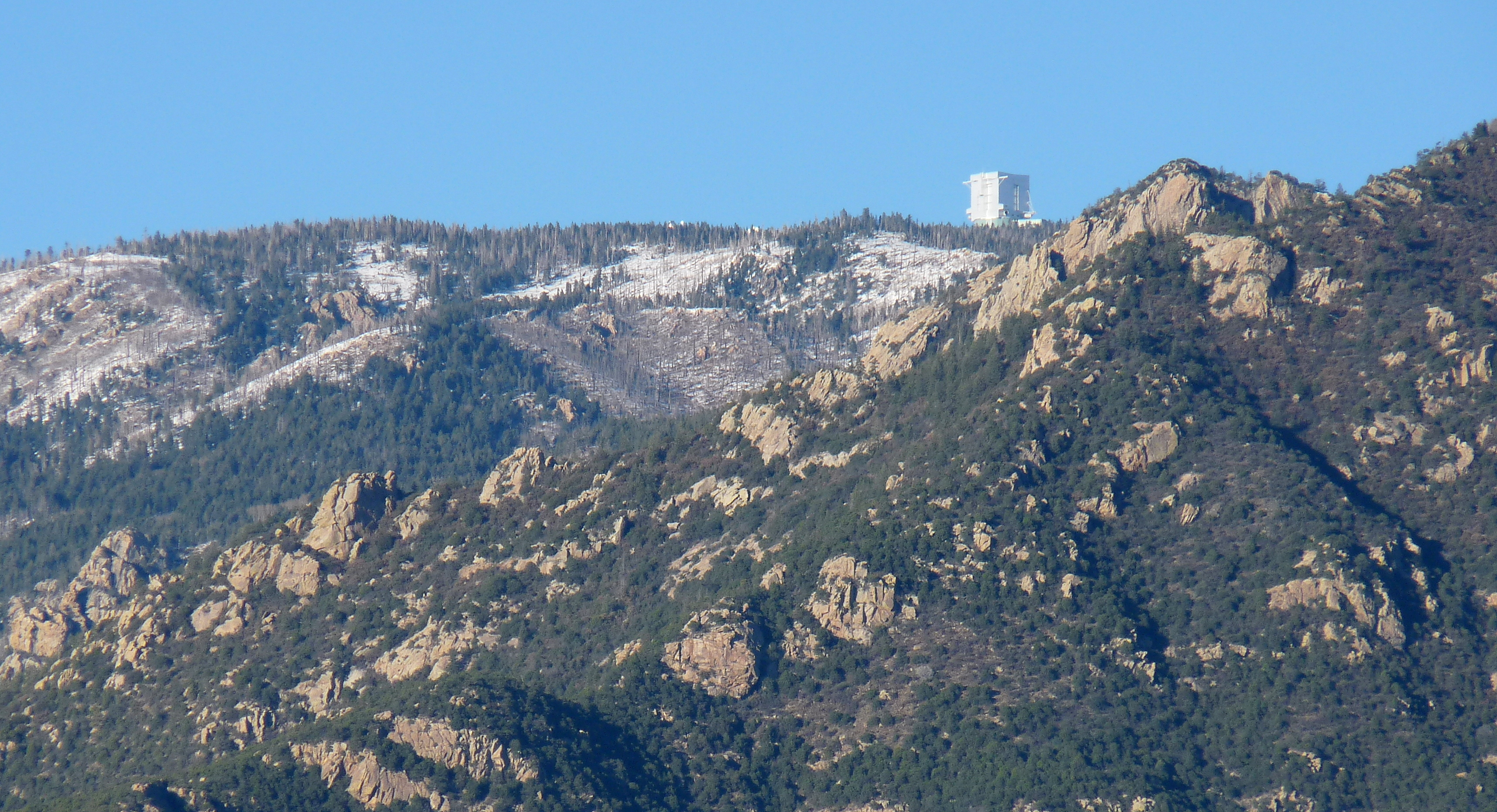
- The Large Binocular Telescope is visible on top of the ridge, right of center. At the center, the Vatican Advanced Technology Telescope and the Heinrich Hertz Submillimeter Telescope are visible in the full-size image.
- Alternative names: MGIO
- Organization: Steward Observatory
- Location: Mount Graham, Graham County, Arizona
- Coordinates: 32°42′04″N 109°53′31″W
- Altitude: 3,191 m (10,469 ft)
- Website: mgio.arizona.edu
- Telescopes: Heinrich Hertz Submillimeter Telescope; Large Binocular Telescope; Vatican Advanced Technology Telescope
- Location of Mount Graham International Observatory
- Related media on Commons

Mount Graham International Observatory (MGIO) is a division of Steward Observatory, the research arm for the Department of Astronomy at the University of Arizona, in the United States. It is located in southeastern Arizona's Pinaleño Mountains near Mount Graham. During development, it was first called the Columbus Project.

Construction of MGIO began in 1989. MGIO operates and maintains facilities for three scientific organizations. The first two telescopes, the Vatican Advanced Technology Telescope and the Heinrich Hertz Submillimeter Telescope began operation in 1993. The Large Binocular Telescope, one of the world's largest and most powerful optical telescopes, began operations using its mirrors independently in 2004, with joint operations between the two mirrors beginning in 2008.

Public tours of the MGIO are conducted by the Eastern Arizona College's (EAC) Discovery Park Campus between mid-April and mid-October (weather permitting and subject to reservations).

The construction and presence of the structures continues to be controversial for environmentalists, University of Arizona students, and Indigenous tribes, as the Observatory is built on grounds sacred to, and ancestrally used by Western Apache peoples. To environmentalists, the concern was primarily the endemic Mount Graham red squirrel. Several news articles reported that the San Carlos Apache Tribal Council approved formal opposition to building the telescopes and a 2021 article detailed a brief history of the mountain leading up to its acquisition as an astronomical research facility. The long and bitter reputation of the observatory has left a mark, taking place alongside other projects that have presented similar struggles between indigenous peoples and scientists such as the Mauna Kea Observatories.

== List of facilities ==
- Large Binocular Telescope operated by the Large Binocular Telescope Corporation.
- Heinrich Hertz Submillimeter Telescope, operated by Arizona Radio Observatory.
- Vatican Advanced Technology Telescope, operated by the Vatican Observatory.

== See also ==
- List of astronomical observatories
