= Vatican Advanced Technology Telescope =

Gregorian telescope in Graham County, Arizona

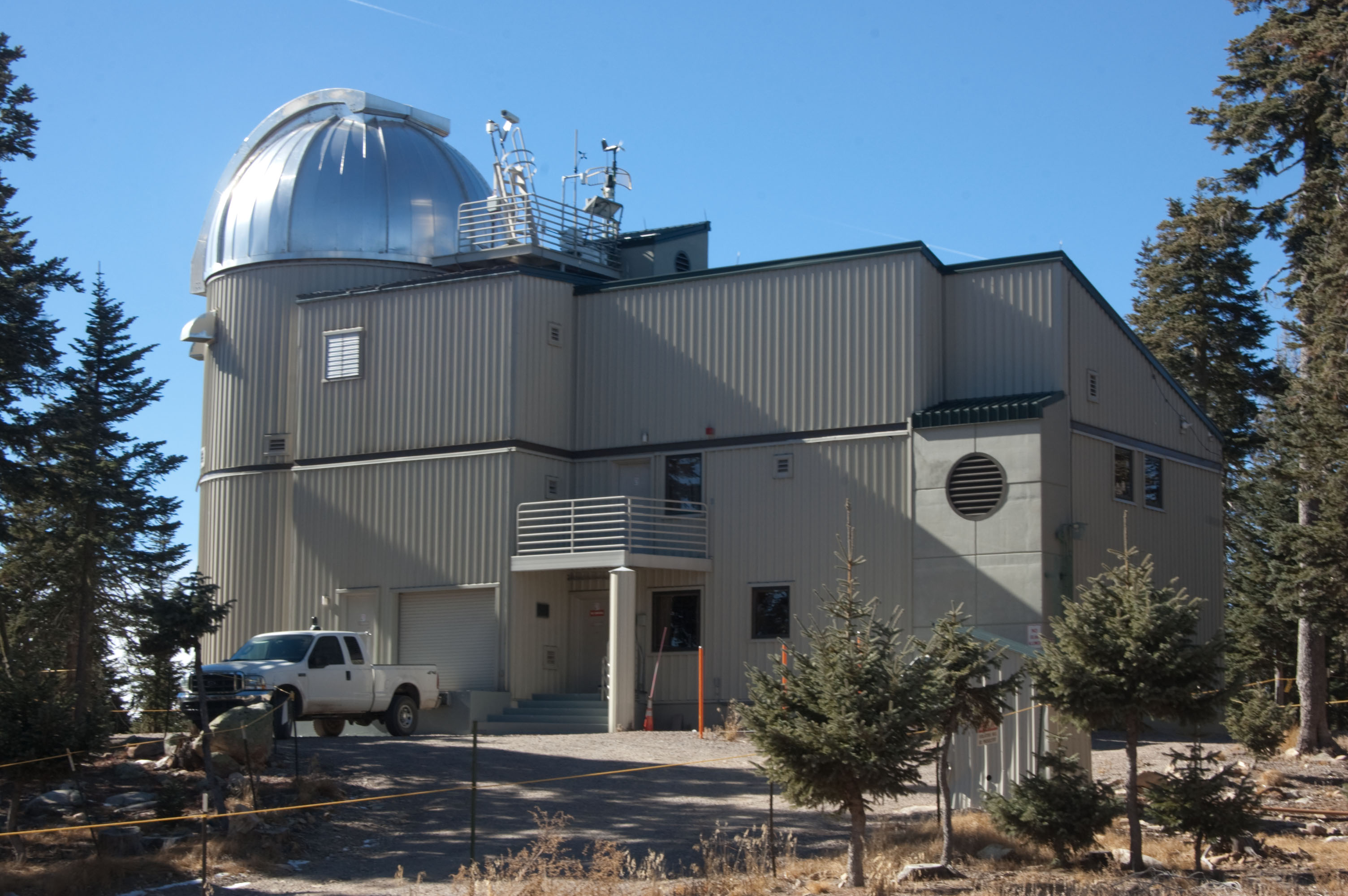
- The Vatican Advanced Technology Telescope (VATT)
- Alternative names: Thomas J. Bannan Astrophysics Facility
- Location(s): Graham County, Arizona
- Coordinates: 32°42′05″N 109°53′31″W
- Altitude: 3,178 m (10,427 ft)
- Diameter: 1.83 m (6 ft 0 in)
- Secondary diameter: 0.38 m (1 ft 3 in)
- Focal length: 16.48 m (54 ft 1 in)
- Website: www.vovatt.org
- Location of Vatican Advanced Technology Telescope
- Related media on Commons

The Alice P. Lennon Telescope and its Thomas J. Bannan Astrophysics Facility, known together as the Vatican Advanced Technology Telescope (VATT), is a Gregorian telescope observing in the optical and infrared situated on Mount Graham in southeast Arizona, United States. Measuring 1.83 m (6 ft 0 in) primary diameter, the telescope achieved its first light in 1993.

VATT is part of the Mount Graham International Observatory and is operated by the Vatican Observatory, one of the oldest astronomical research institutions in the world, in partnership with The University of Arizona.

== Design ==
Optical system	Aplanatic Gregorian f/9
Focal length	16.48 m
Primary mirror	f/1.0, diameter 1.83 m
Secondary mirror	f/0.9, diameter 0.38 m (focus control: 0.1 micrometre)
Field of view	72 mm (15')
Scale	12.52 "/mm
Image quality	0.1' – 6.8"
Mount	Alt-Az + derotator

The heart of the telescope is an f/1.0 honeycombed-construction borosilicate primary mirror. The VATT's mirror is unusually "fast" at f/1, which means that its focal distance is equal to its diameter. Because it has such a short focal length, a Gregorian design could be employed which uses a concave secondary mirror at a point beyond the primary focus; this allows unusually sharp focusing across the field of view.

The unusual optical design and novel mirror fabrication techniques mean that both the primary and secondary mirrors are among the most exact surfaces ever made for a ground-based telescope. In addition, the skies above Mount Graham are among the most clear, steady, and dark in continental North America. Seeing of better than one arc-second even without adaptive optics can be achieved on a regular basis.

== Construction ==
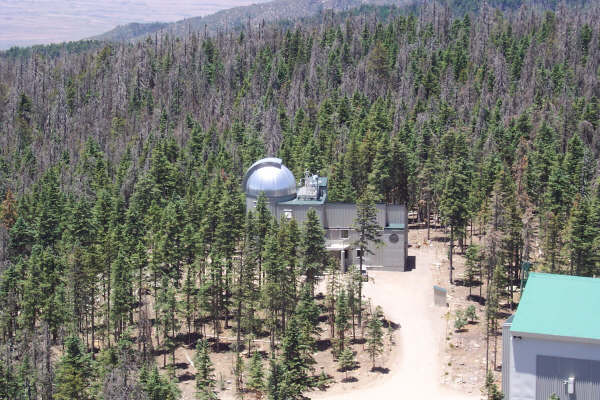
VATT from the balcony of the nearby LBT

The primary mirror was manufactured at The University of Arizona's Steward Observatory Mirror Laboratory, which pioneered both the spin-casting and the stressed-lap polishing techniques which are being used for telescope mirrors that include the 6.5-meter-aperture MMT and Magellan telescopes, and the two 8.4-meter mirrors of the Large Binocular Telescope.

== Research ==
Given its excellent optical qualities, the telescope has been used primarily for imaging and photometric work, in which it regularly outperforms much larger telescopes located elsewhere. Among the results from this telescope have been the discovery of MACHOs in the Andromeda Galaxy; the validation of the Stromvil photometric filter system; evidence for how the shape and dimensions of galaxies have changed over the age of the universe; discovery of the first binary "Vesta chip" asteroid; and the characterization and classification by visible colors of some 100 trans-Neptunian objects, most of them fainter than magnitude 21.

== Funding ==
The government of the Vatican City supports the Vatican Observatory staff and regular research costs, but the cost to build and maintain the VATT itself has come from private donors: the major donors supporting the construction of the VATT were Fred and Alice P. Lennon and Thomas J. Bannan. Benefactors to the Vatican Observatory Foundation continue to support the operating costs of the VATT.

== Other MGIO facilities ==
- Large Binocular Telescope
- Heinrich Hertz Submillimeter Telescope

== See also ==
- Catholic Church and science#Vatican Observatory
- Index of Vatican City-related articles
- List of astronomical observatories
- Mount Graham International Observatory
- Safford, Arizona
