= Large Binocular Telescope =

Telescope for optical astronomy

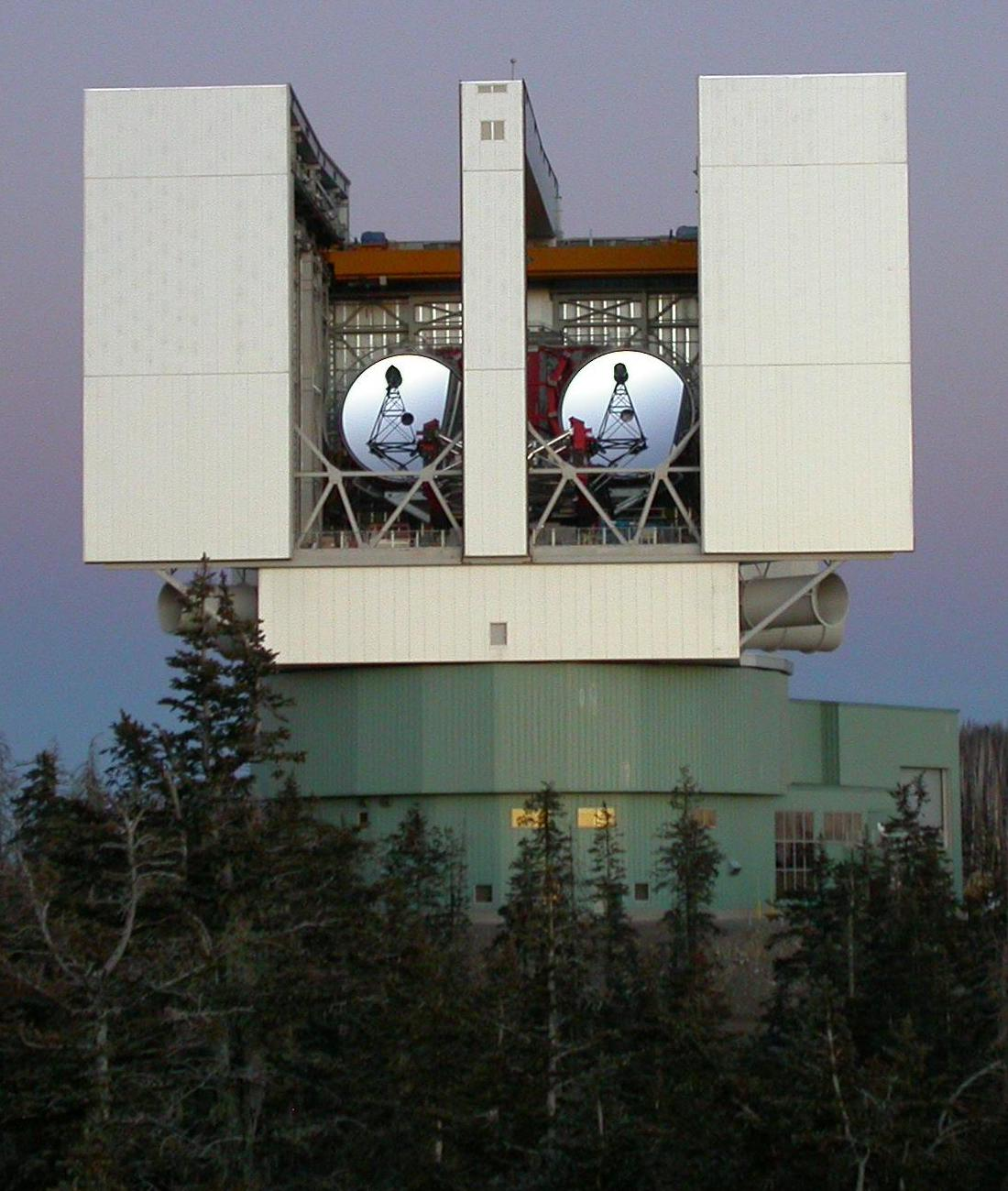
- Alternative names: First Light
- Part of: Mount Graham International Observatory
- Location(s): Mount Graham, Graham County, Arizona
- Coordinates: 32°42′05″N 109°53′21″W
- Altitude: 3,221 m (10,568 ft)
- Diameter: 8.4 m (27 ft 7 in)
- Collecting area: 111 m^{2} (1,190 sq ft)
- Focal length: 9.6 m (31 ft 6 in)
- Website: www.lbto.org
- Location of Large Binocular Telescope
- Related media on Commons

The Large Binocular Telescope (LBT) is an optical telescope for astronomy located on 10,700-foot (3,300 m) Mount Graham, in the Pinaleno Mountains of southeastern Arizona, United States. It is a part of the Mount Graham International Observatory.

When using both 8.4 m (330 inch) wide mirrors, with centres 14.4 m apart, the LBT has the same light-gathering ability as an 11.8 m (464 inch) wide single circular telescope and the resolution of a 22.8 m (897 inch) wide one.

The LBT mirrors individually are the joint second-largest optical telescope in continental North America, next to the Hobby–Eberly Telescope in West Texas. It has the largest monolithic, or non-segmented, mirror in an optical telescope.

Strehl ratios of 60–90% in the infrared H band and 95% in the infrared M band have been achieved by the LBT.

== Project ==
The LBT was originally named the "Columbus Project". It is a joint project of these members: the Italian astronomical community represented by the Istituto Nazionale di Astrofisica, the University of Arizona, University of Minnesota, University of Notre Dame, University of Virginia, the LBT Beteiligungsgesellschaft in Germany (Max Planck Institute for Astronomy in Heidelberg, Landessternwarte in Heidelberg, Leibniz Institute for Astrophysics Potsdam (AIP), Max Planck Institute for Extraterrestrial Physics in Munich and Max Planck Institute for Radio Astronomy in Bonn); Ohio State University; and the Research Corporation for Science Advancement based in Tucson, Arizona, USA. The cost was around 100 million euro.

The telescope design has two 8.4 m (330 inch) mirrors mounted on a common base, hence the name "binocular". LBT takes advantage of active and adaptive optics, provided by Arcetri Observatory. The collecting area is two 8.4 meter aperture mirrors, which works out to about 111 m^{2} combined. This area is equivalent to an 11.8-meter (460 in) circular aperture, which would be greater than any other single telescope, but it is not comparable in many respects since the light is collected at a lower diffraction limit and is not combined in the same way. Also, an interferometric mode will be available, with a maximum baseline of 22.8 meters (75 ft) for aperture synthesis imaging observations and a baseline of 15 meters (49 ft) for nulling interferometry. This feature is along one axis with the LBTI instrument at wavelengths of 2.9–13 micrometres, which is the near infrared.

The telescope was designed by a group of Italian firms, and assembled by Ansaldo in its Milanese plant.

=== Mountain controversy ===
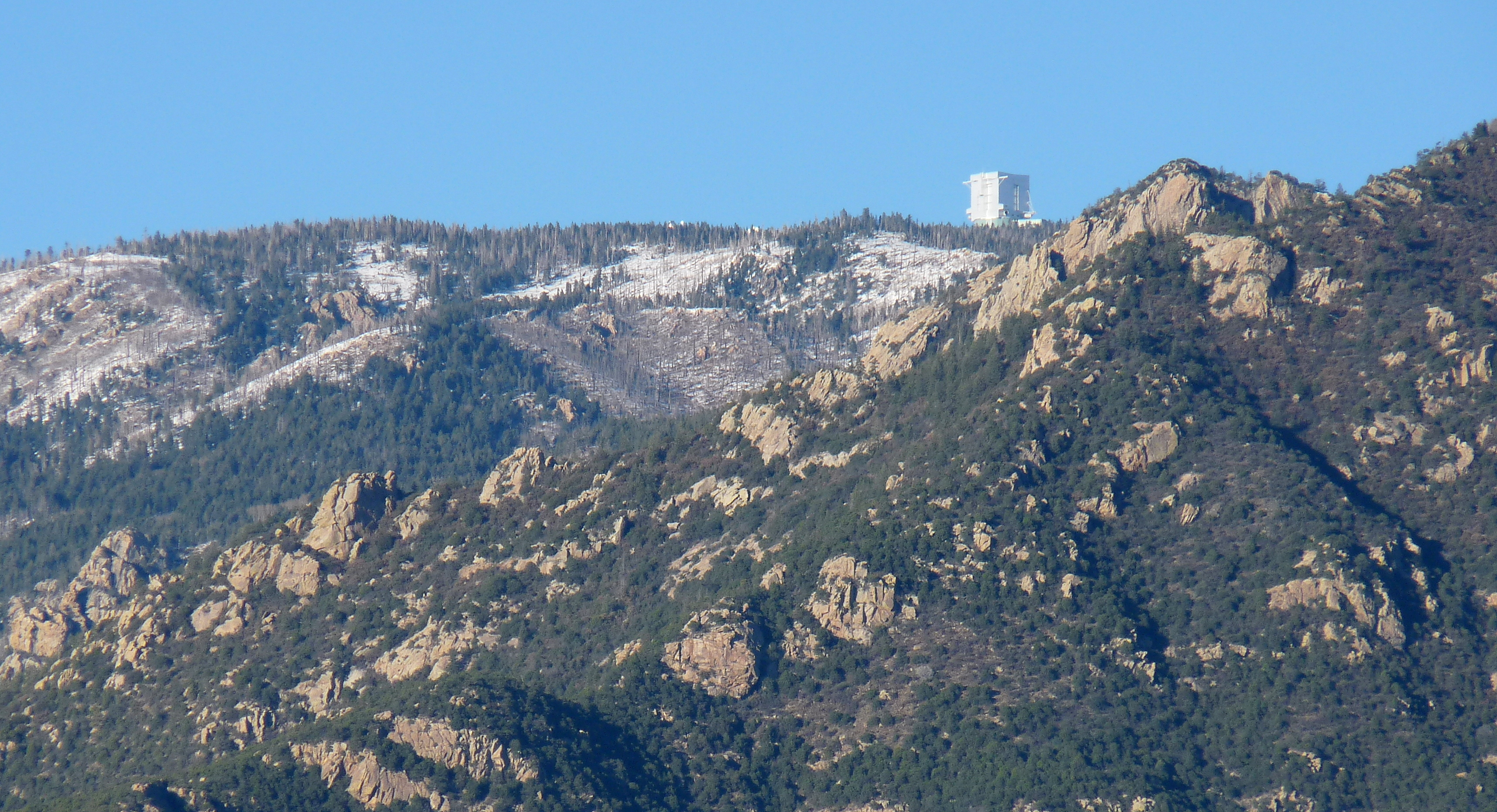
LBT perched on an Arizona mountain

The choice of location sparked considerable local controversy, both from the San Carlos Apache Tribe, who view the mountain as sacred, and from environmentalists who contended that the observatory would cause the demise of an endangered subspecies of the American red squirrel, the Mount Graham red squirrel. Environmentalists and members of the tribe filed some forty lawsuits – eight of which went before a federal appeals court – but the project ultimately prevailed after an act of the United States Congress.

The telescope and mountain observatory survived two major forest fires in thirteen years, the more recent in the summer of 2017. Likewise the squirrels continue to survive. Some experts now believe their numbers fluctuate dependent upon nut harvest without regard to the observatory.

== First light ==
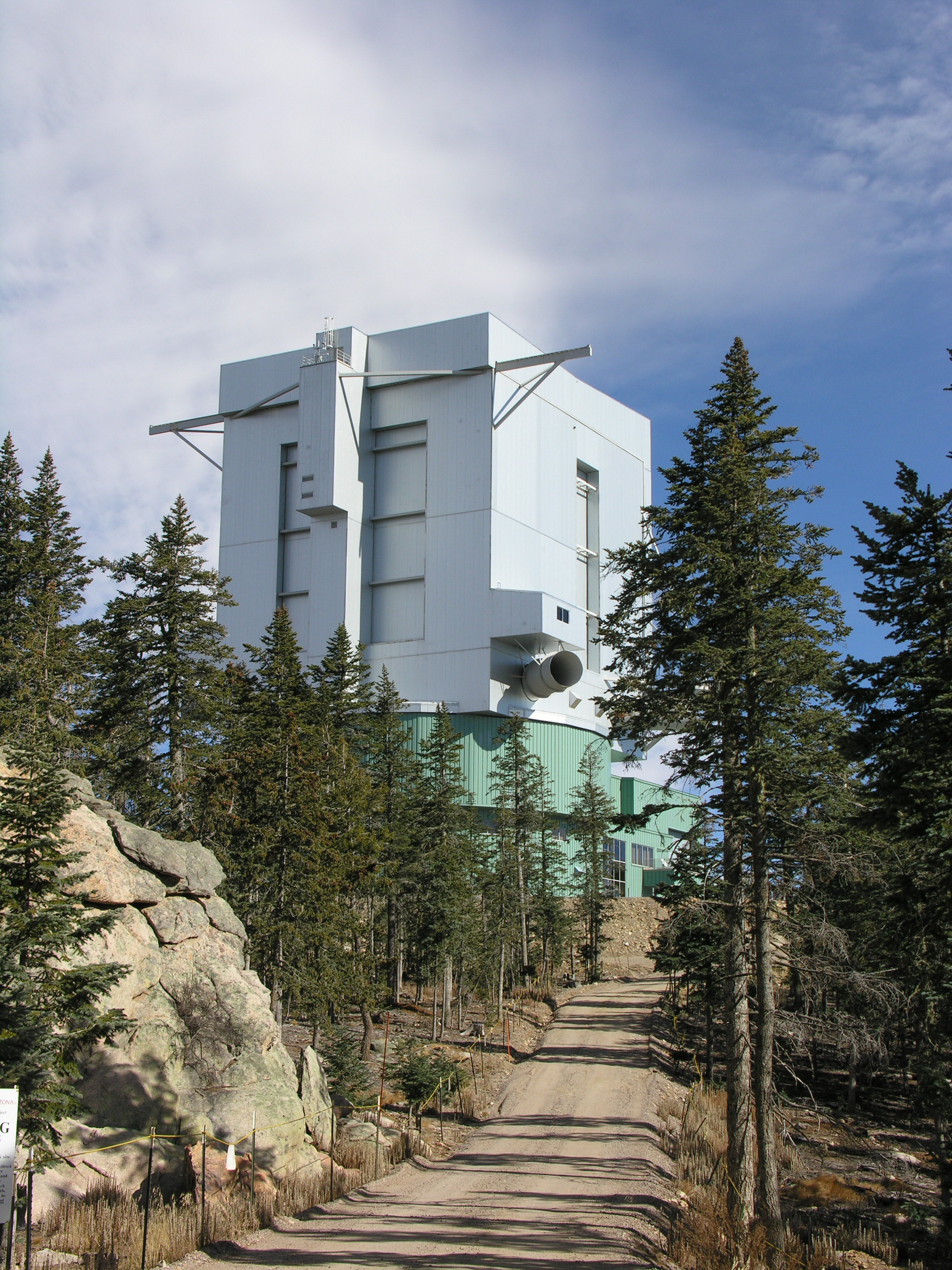
Dome during the day with doors closed

The telescope was dedicated in October 2004 and saw first light with a single primary mirror on October 12, 2005, which viewed NGC 891. The second primary mirror was installed in January 2006 and became fully operational in January 2008. The first light with the second primary mirror was on September 18, 2006, and for the first and second together it was on January 11–12, 2008.

The first binocular light images show three false-color renditions of the spiral galaxy NGC 2770. The galaxy is 88 million light years from the Milky Way galaxy, a relatively close neighbor. The galaxy has a flat disk of stars and glowing gas tipped slightly toward Earth's line of sight.

The first image taken combined ultraviolet and green light, and emphasizes the clumpy regions of newly formed hot stars in the spiral arms. The second image combined two deep red colors to highlight the smoother distribution of older, cooler stars. The third image was a composite of ultraviolet, green and deep red light and shows the detailed structure of hot, moderate and cool stars in the galaxy. The cameras and images were produced by the Large Binocular Camera team, led by Emanuele Giallongo at the Rome Astrophysical Observatory.

In binocular aperture synthesis mode LBT has a light-collecting area of 111 m^{2}, equivalent to a single primary mirror 11.8-meter (39 ft) in diameter, and will combine light to produce the image sharpness equivalent to a single 22.8-meter (75 ft) telescope. However, this requires a beam combiner that was tested in 2008, but has not been a part of regular operations. It can take images with one side at 8.4 m aperture, or take two images of the same object using different instruments on each side of the telescope.

== Adaptive optics ==
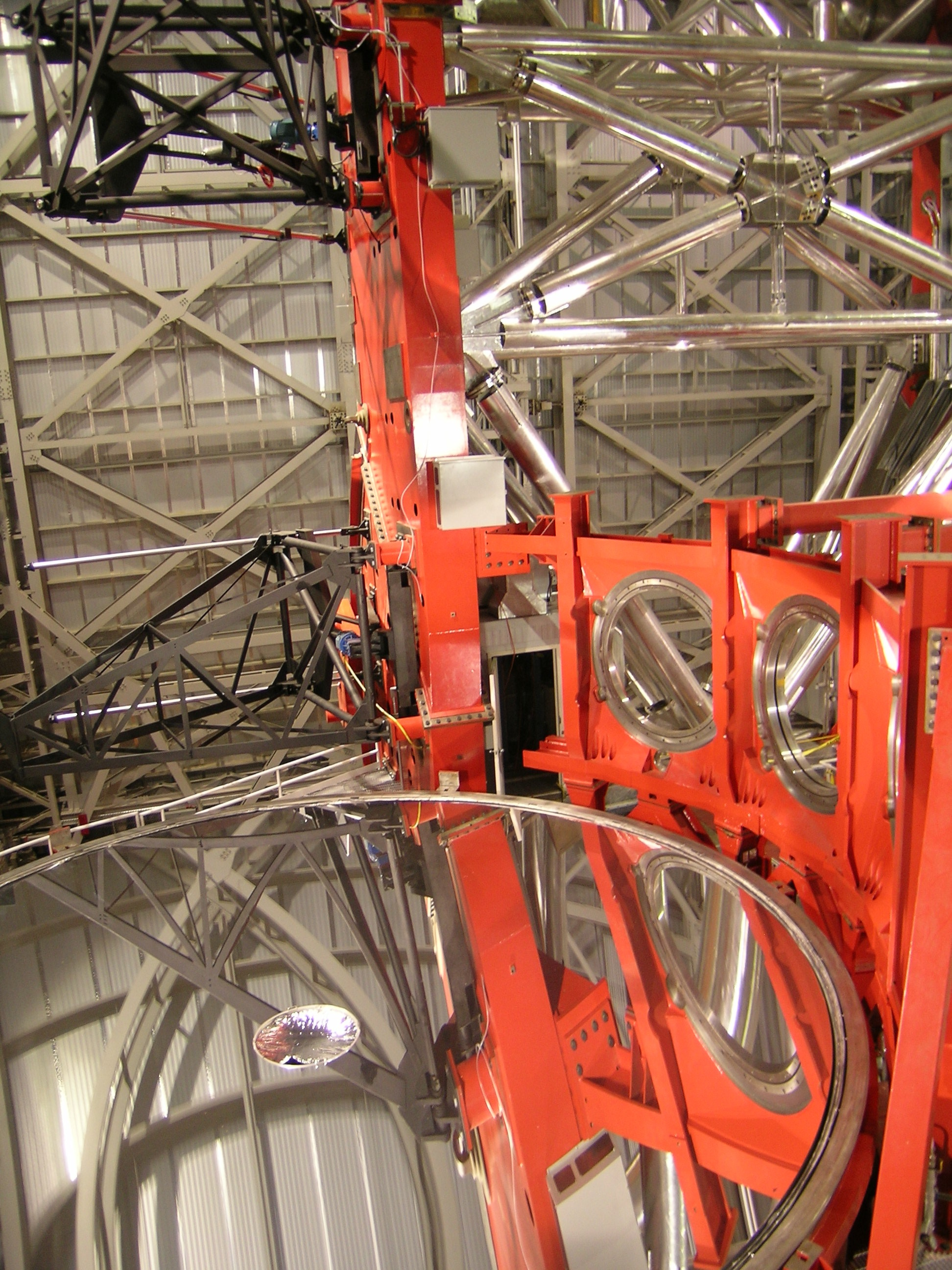
Interior looking down one of the primary mirrors

In the summer of 2010, the "First Light Adaptive Optics" (FLAO) – an adaptive optics system with a deformable secondary mirror rather than correcting atmospheric distortion further downstream in the optics – was inaugurated. Using one 8.4 m side, it surpassed Hubble sharpness (at certain light wavelengths), achieving a Strehl ratio of 60–80% rather than the 20–30% of older adaptive optic systems, or the 1% typically achieved without adaptive optics for telescopes of this size. Adaptive optics at a telescope's secondary (M2) was previously tested at MMT Observatory by the Arcetri Observatory and University of Arizona team.

== In the media ==
The telescope has made appearances on an episode of the Discovery Channel TV show Really Big Things, National Geographic Channel Big, Bigger, Biggest, and the BBC program The Sky At Night. The BBC Radio 4 radio documentary The New Galileos covered the LBT and the James Webb Space Telescope.

== Discoveries and observations ==
LBT, with the XMM-Newton, was used to discover the galaxy cluster 2XMM J083026+524133 in 2008, over 7 billion light years away from Earth. In 2007 the LBT detected a 26th magnitude afterglow from the gamma ray burst GRB 070125.

In 2017, LBT observed the OSIRIS-REx spacecraft, an uncrewed asteroid sample return spacecraft, in space while it was en route.

== Instruments ==
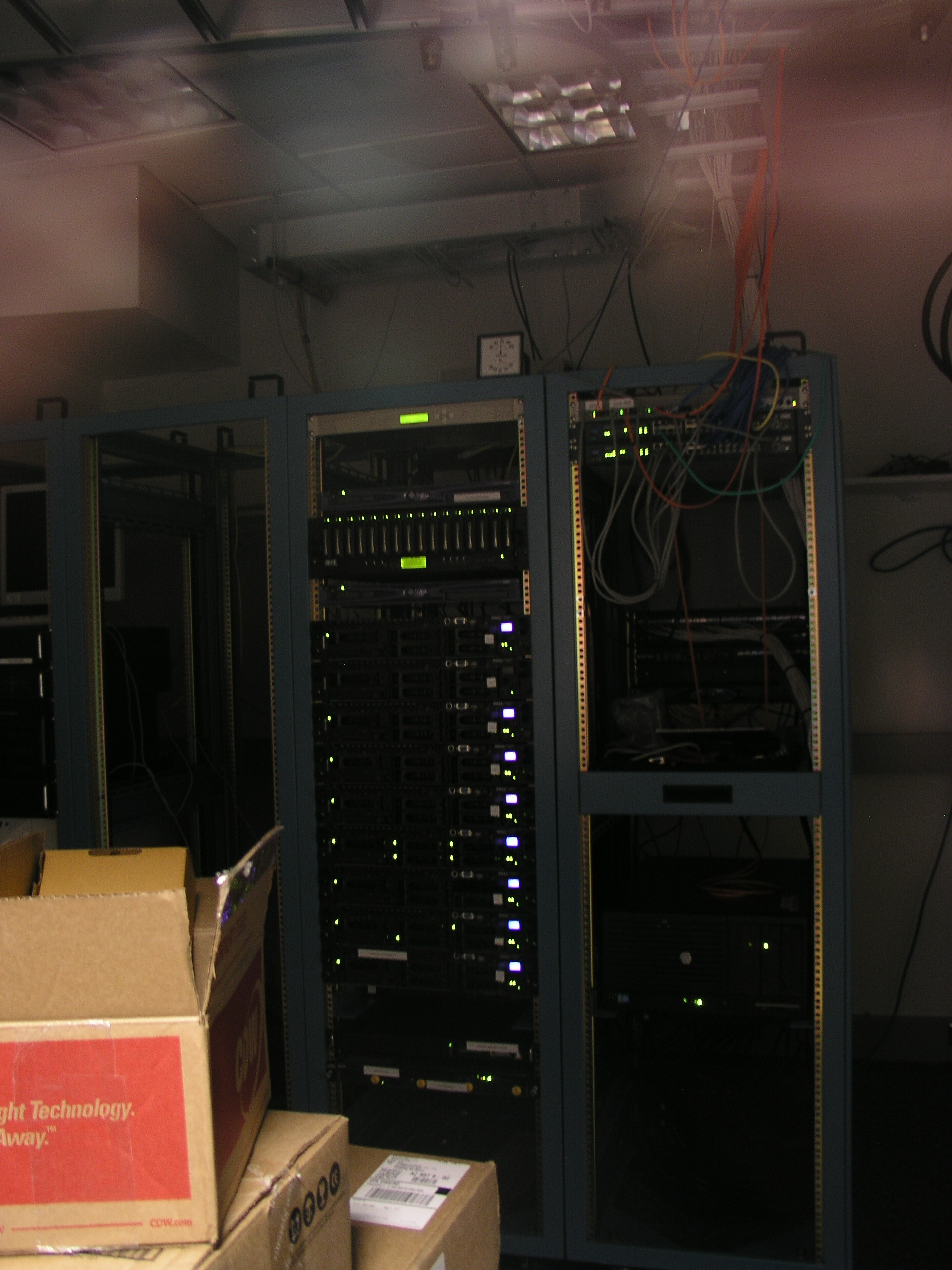
Computer systems for LBT

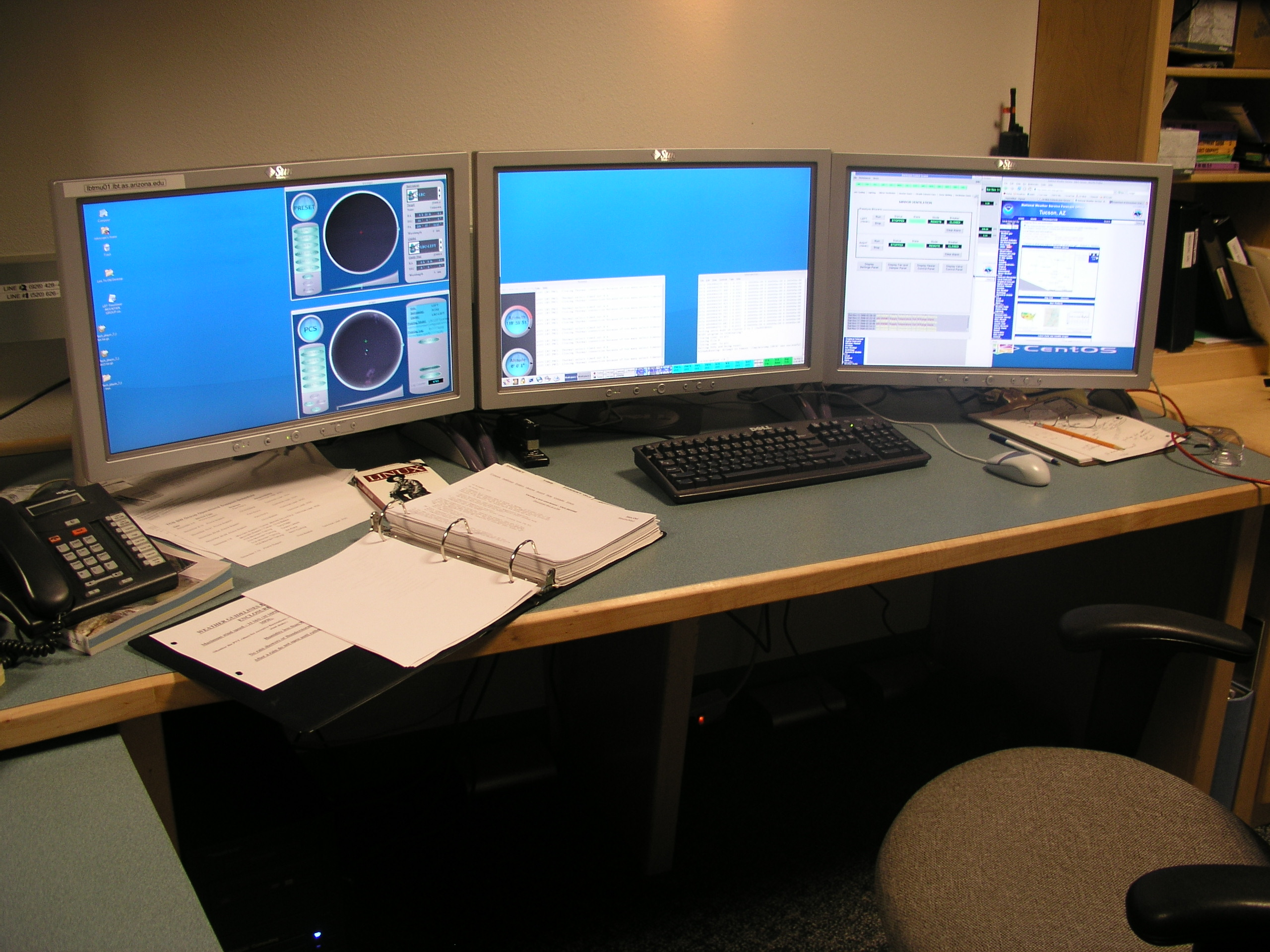
Computer workstation for LBT

Some current or planned LBT telescope instruments:

- LBC – optical and near ultraviolet wide field prime focus cameras. One is optimized for the blue part of the optical spectrum and one for the red. (Both cameras operational)
- PEPSI – A high resolution and very high-resolution optical spectrograph and imaging polarimeter at the combined focus. (In development)
- MODS – two optical multi object and longslit spectrographs plus imagers. Capable of running in a single mirror or binocular mode. (MODS1 operational – MODS2 in integration on the mountain)
- LUCI – two multi-object and longslit infrared spectrographs plus imagers, one for each side (associated with one of the 8m mirrors) of the telescope. The imager has 2 cameras and can observe in both seeing-limited and diffraction-limited (with adaptive optics) modes. End of commissioning and hand over to the LBTO was in 2018.
- LINC/Nirvana – wide-field interferometric imaging with adaptive optics at the combined focus (in commissioning).
- LBTI/LMIRCAM – 2.9 to 5.2 micron Fizeau imaging and medium resolution grism spectroscopy at the combined focus.
- LBTI/NOMIC – N band nulling imager for the study of protoplanetary and debris disks at the combined focus. (In commissioning phase – first stabilization of the fringes in December 2013)
- FLAO – first light adaptive optics to correct atmospheric distortion
- ARGOS – multiple laser guide star unit capable of supporting ground layer or multi conjugate adaptive optics. End of commissioning and handover to LBTO was in 2018.

=== LUCI ===
LUCI (originally LUCIFER: Large Binocular Telescope Near-infrared Spectroscopic Utility with Camera and Integral Field Unit for Extragalactic Research) is the near-infrared instrument for the LBT. The name of the instrument was changed to LUCI in 2012. LUCI operates in the 0.9–2.5 μm spectral range using a 2048 x 2048 element Hawaii-2RG detector array from Teledyne and provides imaging and spectroscopic capabilities in seeing- and diffraction-limited modes. In its focal plane area, long-slit and multi-slit masks can be installed for single-object and multi-object spectroscopy. A fixed collimator produces an image of the entrance aperture in which either a mirror (for imaging) or a grating can be positioned. Three camera optics with numerical apertures of 1.8, 3.75 and 30 provide image scales of 0.25, 0.12, and 0.015 arcsec/detector element for wide field, seeing-limited and diffraction-limited observations. LUCI is operated at cryogenic temperatures, and is therefore enclosed in a cryostat of 1.6 m diameter and 1.6 m height, and cooled to about −200 °C by two closed-cycle coolers.

== LBTO collaboration ==
Comparison of nominal sizes of apertures of the Large Binocular Telescope and some notable optical telescopes

Partners in the LBT project

- Arizona, USA (25%) – AZ
  - The University of Arizona (Headquarters) – Tucson
  - Arizona State University – Tempe
  - Northern Arizona University – Flagstaff
- Germany (25%) – LBTB
  - Landessternwarte – Heidelberg
  - Leibniz-Institut für Astrophysik Potsdam – Potsdam
  - Max-Planck-Institut für Astronomie – Heidelberg
  - Max-Planck-Institut für Extraterrestrische Physik – Munich
  - Max-Planck-Institut für Radioastronomie – Bonn
- Italy (25%) – INAF
  - Istituto Nazionale di Astrofisica
- Research Corporation for Science Advancement, USA (12.5%) – RC
  - The Ohio State University – Ohio
  - University of Notre Dame – Indiana
  - University of Minnesota – Minnesota
  - University of Virginia – Virginia
- The Ohio State University, Ohio, USA (12.5%) – OSU

== Other MGIO facilities ==
- Mount Graham Submillimeter Telescope
- Vatican Advanced Technology Telescope

== See also ==
- Extremely large telescope
- List of astronomical interferometers at visible and infrared wavelengths
- List of largest optical reflecting telescopes
- List of largest optical telescopes historically
- List of largest optical telescopes in the continental United States
- Lists of telescopes
- Mount Graham International Observatory
- Navigator Program
- Richard Green (astronomer)
- Safford, Arizona
