= Omega-hydroxypalmitate O-feruloyl transferase =

Identifiers
- EC no.: 2.3.1.188

Databases
- IntEnz: IntEnz view
- BRENDA: BRENDA entry
- ExPASy: NiceZyme view
- KEGG: KEGG entry
- MetaCyc: metabolic pathway
- PRIAM: profile
- PDB structures: RCSB PDB PDBe PDBsum
Search
- PMC: articles
- PubMed: articles
- NCBI: proteins

Omega-hydroxypalmitate O-feruloyl transferase (EC 2.3.1.188, hydroxycinnamoyl-CoA omega-hydroxypalmitic acid O-hydroxycinnamoyltransferase, HHT) is an enzyme with systematic name feruloyl-CoA:16-hydroxypalmitate feruloyltransferase. This enzyme catalyses the following chemical reaction

feruloyl-CoA + 16-hydroxypalmitate $\rightleftharpoons$ CoA + 16-feruloyloxypalmitate

p-Coumaroyl-CoA and sinapoyl-CoA also act as substrates.
