= ARO 12m Radio Telescope =

12-meter dish on Kitt Peak in Arizona, US

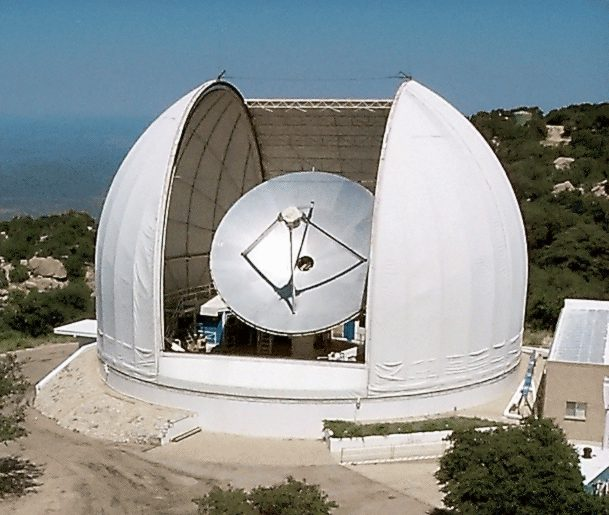
- Alternative names: ARO12m
- Location: Arizona
- Coordinates: 31°57′12″N 111°36′54″W
- Altitude: 1,914 m (6,280 ft)
- Diameter: 12 m (39 ft 4 in)
- Website: aro.as.arizona.edu?q=facilities%2Fuarizona-aro-12-meter-telescope
- Location within the United States
- Related media on Commons

The ARO 12m Radio Telescope (ARO12m or KP12m) is a 12-meter dish located on Kitt Peak, approximately 60 mi (97 km) from Tucson in Arizona at an elevation of 6,215.8 ft (1,894.6 m).

== History ==
The original dish was built in 1967 under the umbrella of the National Radio Astronomy Observatory (NRAO). At that time, it was 36 feet (11 meters) in diameter and was known as the 36-foot Telescope. In 1984, it was renovated with a new backup structure and a slightly larger dish. At this point its name was changed to the 12 Meter Telescope.

In 2000, the NRAO passed control of the telescope to the University of Arizona. The University of Arizona had been operating the Submillimeter Telescope (SMT) located on Mount Graham since 1992. When it took over operations of the 12m, it created the Arizona Radio Observatory (ARO), a part of Steward Observatory of the UArizona College of Science, which now runs both telescopes.

In 2013, the entire antenna (dish and mounting) was replaced with ESO's ALMA prototype antenna, which had been located in New Mexico. The new antenna is the same size (12 meters) but has a much better surface accuracy (thereby permitting use at shorter wavelengths), and a more precise mount with better pointing accuracy.

== Observatory Information ==
This table displays some of the characteristics of the telescope and the site.

Site
East Longitude	-111°	36'	53.475"
North Latitude	+31°	57'	12.000"
Elevation	1914 m (6280 ft)		
Telescope
Primary Reflector Diameter	12.0 m		
Focal Ratio (f/D)	Prime = 0.4, Cassegrain = 8.0		
Surface Accuracy	better than 60 μm rms		
Mount	Elevation over Azimuth		
Slew Rate	6.0°/minute		
Pointing Accuracy	2" rms		
Elevation Limit	3°		
Enclosure	Tracking astrodome with movable door		

== Science at the 12m Radio Telescope ==
In the almost 40 years since it was first built, the 12m Radio Telescope has been at the forefront of millimeter molecular astronomy: studying molecules in space through the use of molecular spectroscopy at millimeter wavelengths. Many of the molecules that have been discovered in the interstellar medium were discovered by the 12m.

== See also ==
- List of astronomical observatories
- Lists of telescopes
