= Daniel Joseph Kelly O'Connell =

Irish astronomer and Jesuit priest

Daniel O'Connell
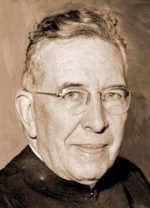
- Born: 25 July 1896; Rugby, England
- Died: October 15, 1982 (aged 86); Rome
- Education: University College Dublin, 1919, BSc University College Dublin, 1920, MSc National University of Ireland, 1949, DSc
- Organization: Society of Jesus Royal Astronomical Society Royal Society of New South Wales Pontifical Academy of Sciences
- Parent(s): Rosa Susannah Helena O’Connell, Daniel O'Connell

Daniel Joseph Kelly O'Connell was a seismologist, astronomer and Jesuit priest who is particularly known for his work in observational astronomy. He worked primarily observing binary star systems, and was involved in photographing the Green Flash. He was also the third president of the Pontifical Academy of Sciences.

== Early life ==
O’Connell was born on 25 July 1896 to an Irish father, also Daniel O’Connell, and an English mother, Rosa Susannah Helena O’Connell, in the English town of Rugby. However, by age 11, both had passed, and he moved to Ireland to attend a boarding school, Clongowes Wood College, which was run by the Society of Jesus. He later joined the society in 1913, which he was a part of for the rest of his life.

In 1915, he joined another school run by the Society of Jesus, Rathfarnham Castle, where he first encountered seismology while working with Father William O'Leary. They built a seismograph together, resulting in O'Connell purchasing a telescope which had previously belonged to Lord Rosse. Radios had been banned due to World War I, and the telescope was a transit tool, so he used it in order to keep the time for his and O'Leary's seismograph.

== Education and career ==
O'Connell studied mathematics and physics at University College Dublin, where he received a BSc in 1919 and an MSc in pure mathematics the year after. He intended to go into research at the University of Cambridge, where he had a scholarship, however, he was in ill health, due to a lung condition. As such, he was advised to continue his work in a warmer climate. This led to him moving to Australia, but not before he spent some time in St Ignatius' College, Valkenburg in the Netherlands. Here he studied philosophy and began observing variable stars.

Eventually, in 1922, he moved to St Ignatius' College, Riverview, in Australia, where he completed his regency for the Society of Jesus. To do this, he taught the students maths and physics. In 1923, he became assistant director of the Riverview Observatory, under Edward Francis Pigot, where he worked until 1926.

After this, O'Connell completed his theological studies, moving back to Ireland, Milltown Park. This led to him being ordained on 31 July 1928. In order to become a full member of the Society of Jesus, he had to complete a tertianship, which he did in St Bueno's College, Wales.

In 1931, on the advice of his former teacher, Johan Stein, O'Connell moved to Cambridge, Massachusetts, where he began work at the Harvard Observatory. His future work was influenced by his time here, where he attended lectures on photographic photometry (by Fred Wipple), and learnt about Cecilia Payne's work on variable stars. This influence is evident in his work from when he moved back to Riverview Observatory in 1933; he used photographic photometry to study variable stars, along with seismology and using different clocks to measure time. In 1935, he was elected a fellow of the Royal Astronomical Society and the Royal Society of New South Wales, and in 1938 he became the director of Riverview Observatory. In 1949, he achieved his DSc from the National University of Ireland.

In 1951, O'Connell published the paper, The so-called periastron effect in close eclipsing binaries, where he described the differences in maxima of the light curves of eclipsing binary stars which could not be explained by the previously described periastron effect. This paper lead to the O'Connell effect being named after him, although it does not yet have a physical explanation.

The next year, O'Connell left Australia, as he was appointed the director of the Vatican Observatory in Rome. When asked about his position as a man of both religion and science, he responded that "They're distinct. I mean, there's no opposition between them." He installed the observatory's largest telescope, a 60/90-cm Schmidt telescope, which was used to observe stars. His research led to him being nominated a member of the Pontifical Academy of Sciences on 24 September 1964, which he eventually became the president of in 1968. He organized two study weeks for the Pontifical Academy, one on Stellar Populations, and another on Nuclei of Galaxies in 1957 and 1970 respectively; he edited the proceedings of each into books. When Pope Pius XII was criticised for speaking in the second study week, O'Connell defended him, saying that the Pope "studied very carefully the technical material presented to him and made it his own, and moulded it so as to drive home the religious or ethical considerations he wished to put before his audience."

== Retirement ==
O'Connell retired from the Vatican Observatory in 1970 and from the Pontifical Academy of Sciences in 1972. In 1982, O'Connell died in Rome, at the headquarters of the Society of Jesus. As seen from his presence in both the church and scientific organisations, he was very involved with the community, which is shown in his obituary, where Coyne and McCarthy commemorated him saying "he still treasured immensely his friends and was, as a matter of fact, always nurturing new friendships."
