= Mount Graham =

Mountain in Arizona, United States

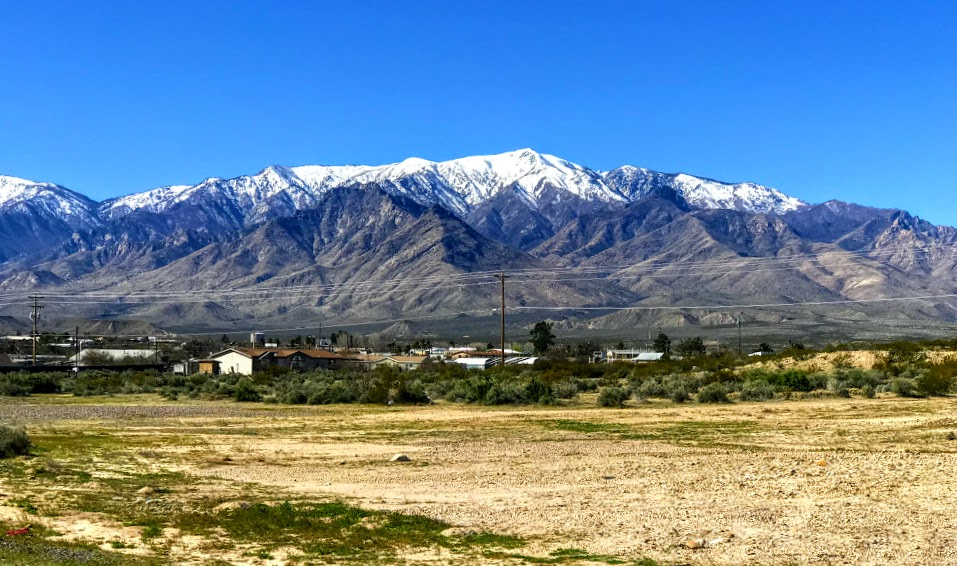
- Mount Graham, Safford

Highest point
- Elevation: 10,720 ft (3,270 m) NAVD 88
- Prominence: 6,320 ft (1,926 m) (#1 in Arizona)
- Listing: U.S. most prominent peaks 50th; Arizona county high point
- Coordinates: 32°42′06″N 109°52′17″W

Geography
- Location within Arizona Location within the United States
- Location: Graham County, Arizona, U.S.
- Parent range: Pinaleño Mountains
- Topo map: USGS Mount Graham

Mount Graham (called in Nnee biyati' (Western Apache) Dził Nchaa Sí'an – 'Big Seated Mountain') is a mountain in Graham County, Arizona, United States, approximately 70 miles (110 km) northeast of Tucson. The mountain reaches 10,720 feet (3,267 m) in height. It is the highest elevation in Graham County, Coronado National Forest and the Pinaleño Mountains. It is also the southernmost peak and land area in the continental United States above 10,000 feet (3,048 m). As the name "Mount Graham" is often used by locals to refer to the entire mountain range, the peak itself is frequently referred to as "High Peak". It is twentieth of the 57 ultra-prominent peaks of the lower 48 states, and the first of the five in Arizona.

== Description ==
Mount Graham summits are headwaters for numerous perennial streams that tumble through five major botanical zones. Located between the southern Rocky Mountains and Mexico's Sierra Madre Occidental, and biologically isolated for millennia, the higher elevations have provided refuge for relict populations of plants and animals with adaptive strategies rooted in Pleistocene ice age environmental conditions. Of particular note are stands of the oldest conifer trees in the U.S. Southwest and associated habitats for threatened and endangered species, especially the Mount Graham Red Squirrel.

Located near the northern limit of the Chiricahua Apache homeland and the southern margins of Western Apache territory, the range is one of the Western Apache's four holiest mountains and is considered sacred by all of the region's Native peoples. Since a determination by the Keeper of the Register in 2002, Dził Nchaa Sí'an, as it is known in the Western Apache language, ranks as the largest and most extensive (~330,000 acres) property listed on or formally determined eligible for the National Register of Historic Places.

In 1993, the St. Paisius Orthodox Monastery was founded at the base of the mountain.

Mount Graham hosts both species of Arizona native trout – Gila and Apache trout and three species of introduced trout.

== Climate ==
Climate data for Mount Graham 32.7019 N, 109.8738 W, Elevation: 10,482 ft (3,195 m) (1991–2020 normals)
Month	Jan	Feb	Mar	Apr	May	Jun	Jul	Aug	Sep	Oct	Nov	Dec	Year
Mean daily maximum °F (°C)	40.6 (4.8)	40.6 (4.8)	44.3 (6.8)	49.8 (9.9)	58.2 (14.6)	68.3 (20.2)	68.3 (20.2)	66.2 (19.0)	62.4 (16.9)	55.6 (13.1)	47.9 (8.8)	41.0 (5.0)	53.6 (12.0)
Daily mean °F (°C)	28.8 (−1.8)	28.6 (−1.9)	32.1 (0.1)	36.8 (2.7)	44.6 (7.0)	53.7 (12.1)	55.7 (13.2)	54.3 (12.4)	50.2 (10.1)	42.7 (5.9)	35.6 (2.0)	29.3 (−1.5)	41.0 (5.0)
Mean daily minimum °F (°C)	17.0 (−8.3)	16.6 (−8.6)	19.8 (−6.8)	23.7 (−4.6)	31.1 (−0.5)	39.2 (4.0)	43.1 (6.2)	42.4 (5.8)	38.1 (3.4)	29.9 (−1.2)	23.4 (−4.8)	17.6 (−8.0)	28.5 (−1.9)
Average precipitation inches (mm)	3.23 (82)	3.43 (87)	3.13 (80)	1.28 (33)	1.06 (27)	0.77 (20)	6.21 (158)	6.61 (168)	3.55 (90)	2.80 (71)	2.80 (71)	3.41 (87)	38.28 (974)
Source: PRISM Climate Group

== Mount Graham Observatory ==
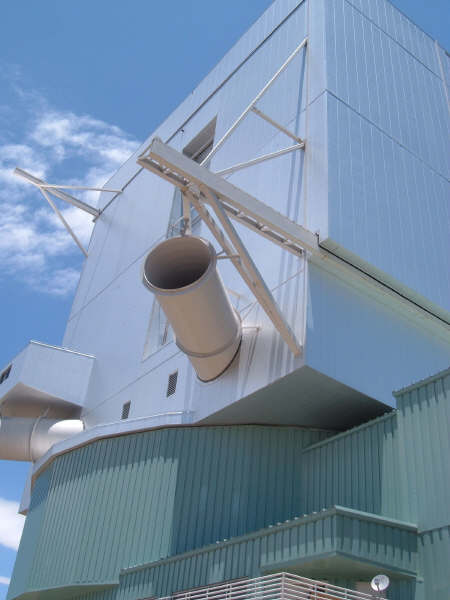
The Large Binocular Telescope of the Mount Graham International Observatory on Mount Graham, 2004

Mount Graham is home to the Mount Graham International Observatory area, where multiple organizations have set up large telescopes in a few separate observatories authorized by a rare peace-time Congressional waiver of U.S. environmental laws.

The United States Congress authorized construction of the observatories on the mountain in 1988, but there has been outcry from the four federally recognized tribes of the Western Apache Nation and Native American groups, who consider the site to be sacred. Environmental groups, including the Sierra Club, also oppose the Mount Graham International Observatory because the higher elevations are the last remaining habitat for the Mount Graham Red Squirrel.

== See also ==
- List of mountains in Arizona
- List of the most prominent summits of the United States
- Heinrich Hertz Submillimeter Telescope
- Large Binocular Telescope
- Vatican Advanced Technology Telescope
