= Heinrich Hertz Submillimeter Telescope =

Radio telescope in Graham County, Arizona

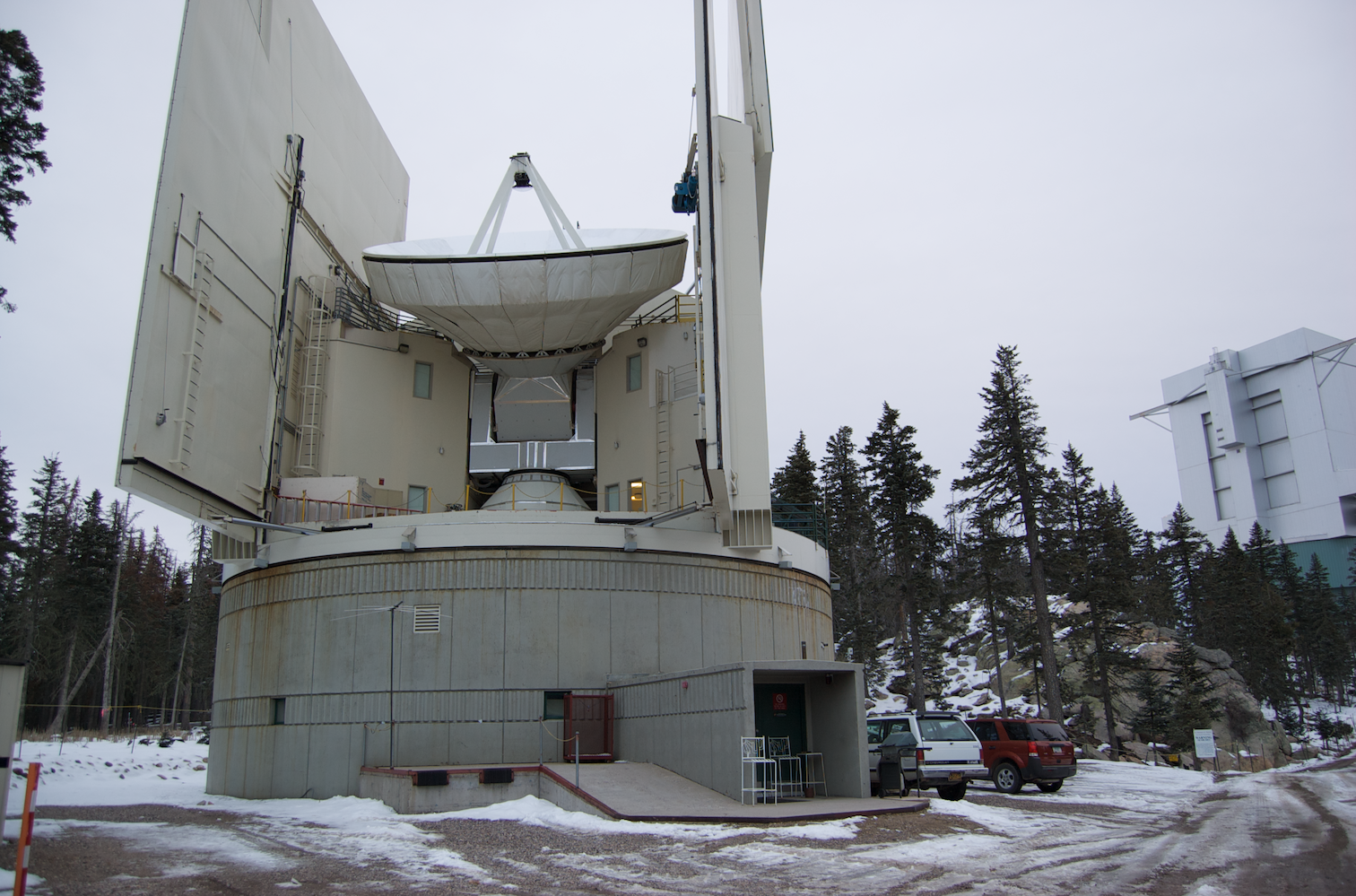
- Alternative names: Submillimeter Telescope
- Location(s): Arizona
- Coordinates: 32°42′06″N 109°53′28″W
- Altitude: 3,185 m (10,449 ft)
- Diameter: 10 m (32 ft 10 in)
- Secondary diameter: 0.69 m (2 ft 3 in)
- Mass: 44.76 t (44,760 kg)
- Focal length: 3.5 m (11 ft 6 in)
- Website: aro.as.arizona.edu
- Location of Heinrich Hertz Submillimeter Telescope
- Related media on Commons

The Submillimeter Telescope (SMT), formerly known as the Heinrich Hertz Submillimeter Telescope, is a submillimeter wavelength radio telescope located on Mount Graham, Arizona, US. It is a 10-meter-wide parabolic dish inside a building to protect it from bad weather. The building front doors and roof are opened when the telescope is in use. The telescope's construction was finished in 1993. Along with the 12 Meter Telescope on Kitt Peak, this telescope is maintained by the Arizona Radio Observatory, a division of Steward Observatory at the University of Arizona.

The dryness of the air around and above Mount Graham is important for extremely high frequency (EHF) radio and far-infrared observations – a region of the spectrum where the electromagnetic waves are strongly attenuated by any water vapor or clouds in the air.

This telescope is used nine to ten months of the year, and it is stowed only when there is too much water vapor in the atmosphere, primarily during the summertime. This telescope is one of the telescopes that make up Mount Graham International Observatory.

== See also ==
- Mount Graham International Observatory
- James Clerk Maxwell Telescope submillimeter telescope at Mauna Kea Observatory
- List of observatories
- Lists of telescopes
