= Gravity Probe =

Gravity Probe may refer to:

- Gravity Probe A
- Gravity Probe B
