= Leistner =

Leistner is a German surname. Notable people with the surname include:

- Achim Leistner, Australian master optician of the Avogadro project
- Claudia Leistner (born 1965), German female figure skater
- Hugo Leistner (1902–2002), American hurdler
- Toni Leistner (born 1990), German footballer
