= Timeline of Gravity Probe B =

The Gravity Probe B mission timeline describes the events during the flight of Gravity Probe B, the science phase of its experimental campaign, and the analysis of the recorded data.

== Mission progress ==
- April 20, 2004
  - Launch of GP-B from Vandenberg AFB and successful insertion into polar orbit.

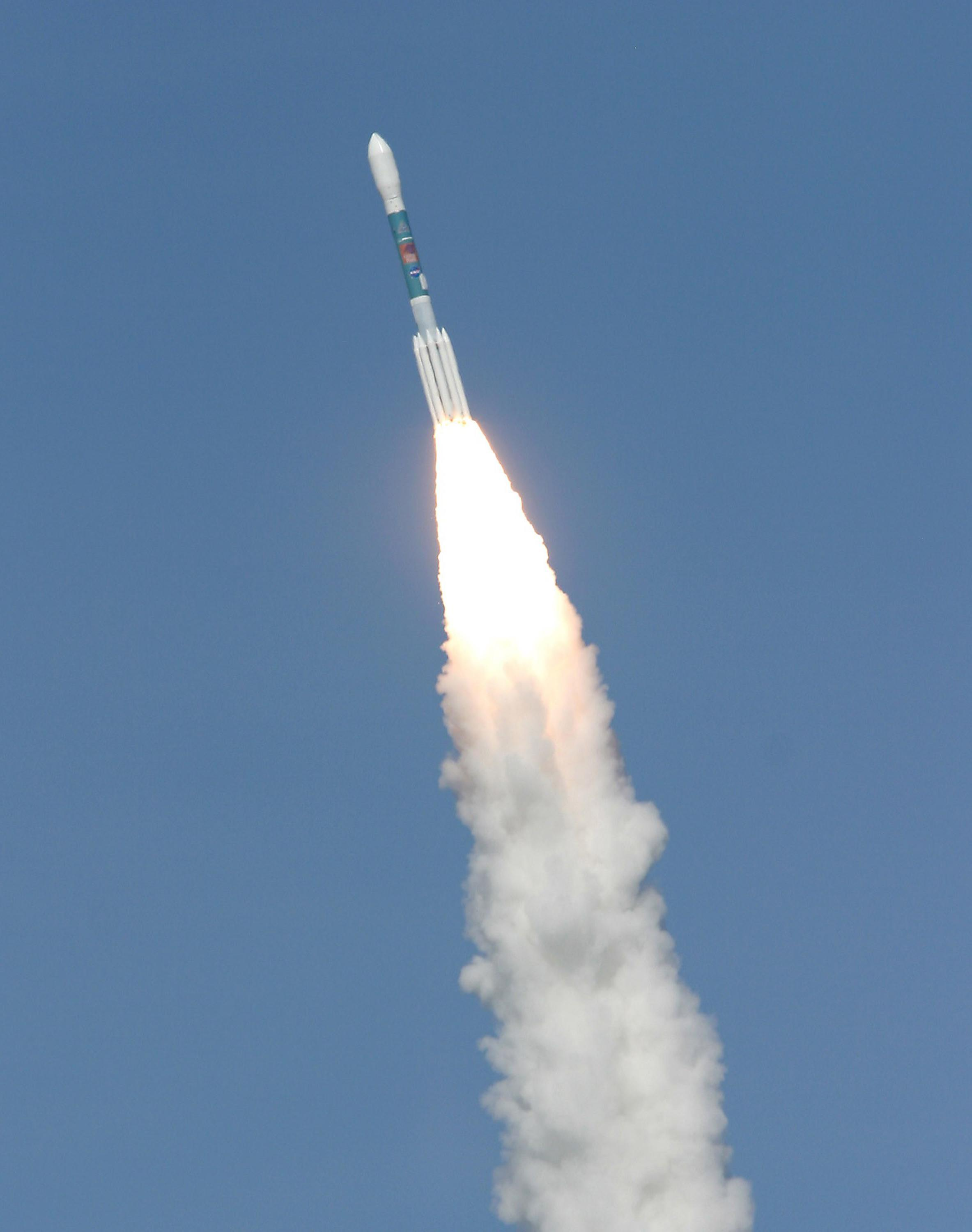
Launch of Gravity Probe B

- April 28, 2004
  - Mission controllers started the "Initialization and Orbit Checkout" phase (IOC), which was expected to last 40–60 days. At this point all gyros were spun up and the SQUID detectors were being checked. All other spacecraft subsystems performed well, including solar power and the attitude control system.
- May 1, 2004
  - During the IOC the primary computer of the spacecraft received too much radiation to cope with the built-in error correction mechanism. GP-B switched over to the backup computer as designed. Since the spacecraft crosses over the polar areas of the Earth with their high radiation, this was anticipated by the designers. The primary computer was repaired and put back into service. All science instruments on board were working perfectly throughout this incident.
- May 14, 2004
  - The spacecraft went into safe mode for a short period when some of the helium micro-thrusters behaved in an unstable way. This problem was addressed quickly and GP-B went back into IOC mode. The cause of this incident was a high-pressure condition in the dewar, which was reached due to warm (10 K) helium being used to remove magnetic flux from the gyroscopes. Mission members believed that the IOC phase would still be completed on time after a total 60 mission days.
- July 13, 2004
  - The preparations for the science phase of the mission reached a major milestone: One of the gyros (No. 4) reached the science-ready speed of 6,348 rpm (105.8 Hz) during a short test.
- July 16, 2004
  - An unexpectedly large slowdown of gyro 4 was detected during the full-speed spin-up of gyro 2. Although some "leakage" effect was expected, the amount seen led mission planners to search for ways to diminish the effect for this final step towards the science phase. This investigation took close to a week and delayed the planned spin-up of gyro 1 and 3.
  - Ground tests had indicated that a good signal-to-noise ratio for science data is reached, once the gyro spin rate exceeds 80 Hz. However, mission managers stress that a slightly lower number will also be sufficient for entering the science phase of GP-B.
- August 27, 2004
  - Mission managers announced that GP-B entered its science phase, today. On mission day 129 all systems were configured to be ready for data collection, with the only exception being gyro 4, which needs further spin axis alignment.
  - After weeks of testing it was decided to use the "back-up drag-free" mode around gyro 3. Back-up drag-free mode suspends the rotor electrically and flies the thrusters to drive the suspension correction to zero. This contrasts with main drag-free mode which uses no electrical suspension, and flies the thrusters to center the rotor. Also, the rotation period of GP-B was adjusted to 0.7742 rpm (from the original 0.52 rpm planned) in order to make better use of the lower than planned rotor speeds. The spacecraft roll rate is always chosen to avoid harmonic interferences with the sample rate, the orbital rate, the calibration rate and the telemetry data rate during data taking.
  - They also report that it was planned to continue tuning the drag-free performance of the Attitude and Translation Control (ATC) system in the early portion of the Science Phase to correct for an unknown force, which is causing excess helium flow from the Dewar through the micro thrusters.
- September 7, 2004
  - The main computer suffered a "double-bit" error in its memory. The location of this error was non-critical to the mission and the function of the spacecraft. A correction that fixed the problem was successfully uploaded. All other subsystems are reported to continue to perform well.
- September 16, 2004
  - Gyro #4 joined Gyros #1, #2, and #3 in science mode after its spin axis was successfully aligned with the guide star
- September 23, 2004
  - Due to problems with gyro 3, GP-B went into safe mode. The mission team was able to ensure minimal impact to the science by exercising the "safing" actions of the spacecraft, and switch the control system setup. It is now maintaining the drag-free orbit around gyro 1.
- September 24, 2004
  - The mission went back into science mode.
- October 19, 2004
  - Gyro 1 showed the same behavior as gyro 3 earlier, which prompted mission members to switch back to a drag-free orbit around gyro 3. Adjustments were made to both gyro suspension systems (GSS) to avoid future problems. All this was done in a span of three hours, and science data collection was interrupted only briefly.
- November 10, 2004
  - When passing over the South Atlantic Anomaly during a strong solar storm, a memory error in a critical region put GP-B into safe mode. This incident caused a computer to reboot and put the gyros into "analog mode." After about two days all memory problems were fixed and science data became available again. At first, it was assumed a proton hit from the storm was the cause, but later analysis showed that this was not the case. Instead, an earlier error at a presumed non-critical memory position was causing the safe mode, when the memory was accessed during routine maintenance.
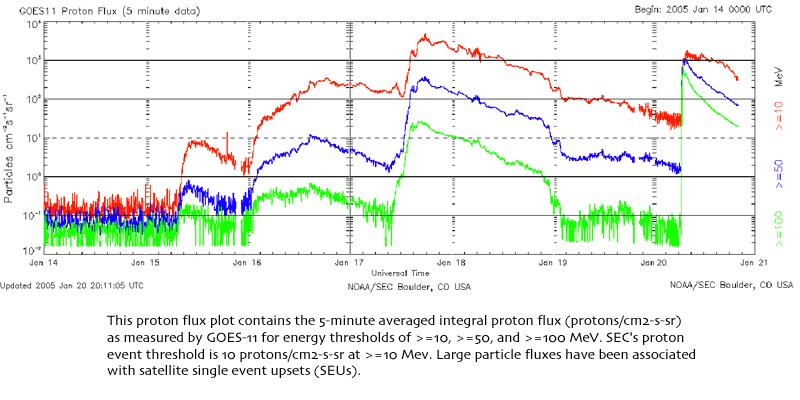
- Proton flux due to Solar flares, January 2005
  January 2005
  - A series of strong solar flares disrupted data taking for several days. On January 17 a very powerful radiation storm created multi-bit errors in the onboard computer memory, and saturated the telescope detectors so that GP-B lost track of the guide star. The science team, however, is confident that the temporary loss of science data will have no significant effect on the results. On January 20 the high level of proton flux was still generating "single bit errors" in GP-B memory, but the telescope is locked on the guide star again, and the gyroscope electronics seem to perform nominally.
- March 14, 2005
  - The onboard backup computer (B-side) rebooted after a safe mode event, which came two weeks after the switch-over from the nominal computer (A-side). Both events were triggered by the occurrence of Multi-Bit Errors (MBEs) in the memory of each computer. It took mission members about 29 hours to recover and transfer back to the nominal state, with the guide star locked in.
- May 6, 2005
  - Mission members deduce from a "heat pulse test" that there is enough liquid helium on board the spacecraft to cool the experiment until sometime between late August and early September 2005. They are preparing to start the calibration procedures, and thus end the science phase, in early August.
- August 15, 2005
  - The science phase of the mission ended and the spacecraft instruments transitioned to the final calibration mode.
- September 26, 2005
  - The calibration phase ended with liquid helium still in the dewar. The spacecraft was returned to science mode pending the depletion of the last of the liquid helium.
- September 29, 2005
  - The liquid helium in the dewar finally ran out, and the experiment began to warm up.
  - Drag-free mode turned off.
- February 2006
  - Phase I of data analysis complete
- July 10, 2006
  - uncommanded reboot of the backup CCCA flight computer
- August 2006
  - Completion of Phase II of data analysis
- September 2006
  - Analysis team realised that more error analysis, particularly around the Polhode motion of the gyros, was necessary than could be done in the time to April 2007, and applied to NASA for an extension of funding to the end of 2007.
- October 2006
  - United States Air Force Academy (USAFA) take control of satellite operations
- December 2006
  - Completion of Phase III of data analysis
- April 14, 2007
  - Announcement of best results obtained to date. Francis Everitt gave a plenary talk at the meeting of the American Physical Society announcing initial results: "The data from the GP-B gyroscopes clearly confirm Einstein's predicted geodetic effect to a precision of better than 1 percent. However, the frame-dragging effect is 170 times smaller than the geodetic effect, and Stanford scientists are still extracting its signature from the spacecraft data." (Source: Gravity Probe B web site)
- Spring 2008
  - Mission update

Increasing the Precision of the Results : "In reality, GP-B experienced six major or significant anomalies during the 353-day science data collection period, and these anomalies caused the experimental data set to be divided into seven major segments, with a total of 307 days of "good" science data when all seven segments are combined. This segmentation reduced the best precision obtainable from the 1% goal down to about 2% for the frame-dragging effect and 0.02% for the geodetic effect. This reduced level of precision, if achieved would be extraordinary."

- May 2011
  - Final results are published in a paper in Physical Review Letters and on the arXiv. The results of a geodetic drift rate of −6,601.8±18.3 mas/yr and a frame-dragging drift rate of −37.2±7.2 mas/yr are consistent with the GR predictions of −6,606.1 mas/yr and −39.2 mas/yr, respectively.

=== Program conclusion ===
The spacecraft was decommissioned on December 8, 2010. The GP-B program formally concluded on May 4, 2011, when NASA hosted a press conference and public announcement of the final experimental results at NASA Headquarters in Washington, D.C. The final results were published in the May 31, 2011 issue of Physical Review Letters.

== See also ==
- Frame-dragging
- Geodetic effect
- Gravity Probe B
- Tests of general relativity
- Timeline of gravitational physics and relativity
