= Achim Leistner =

Australian optician of German origin

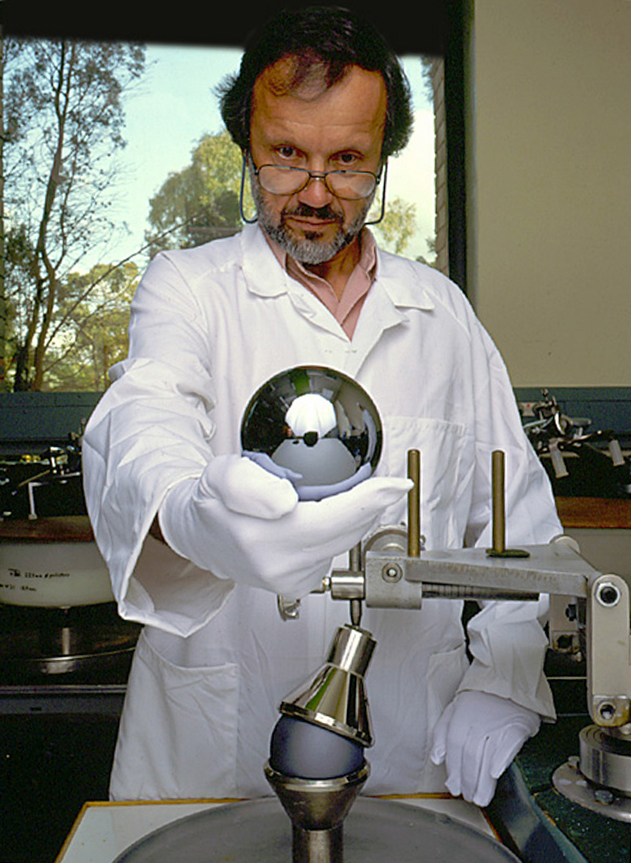
- Achim Leistner at the Australian Centre for Precision Optics, holding a 1 kg (2.2 lb), single-crystal silicon sphere for the Avogadro project.
- Known for: Avogadro project
- Scientific career
- Fields: Optics

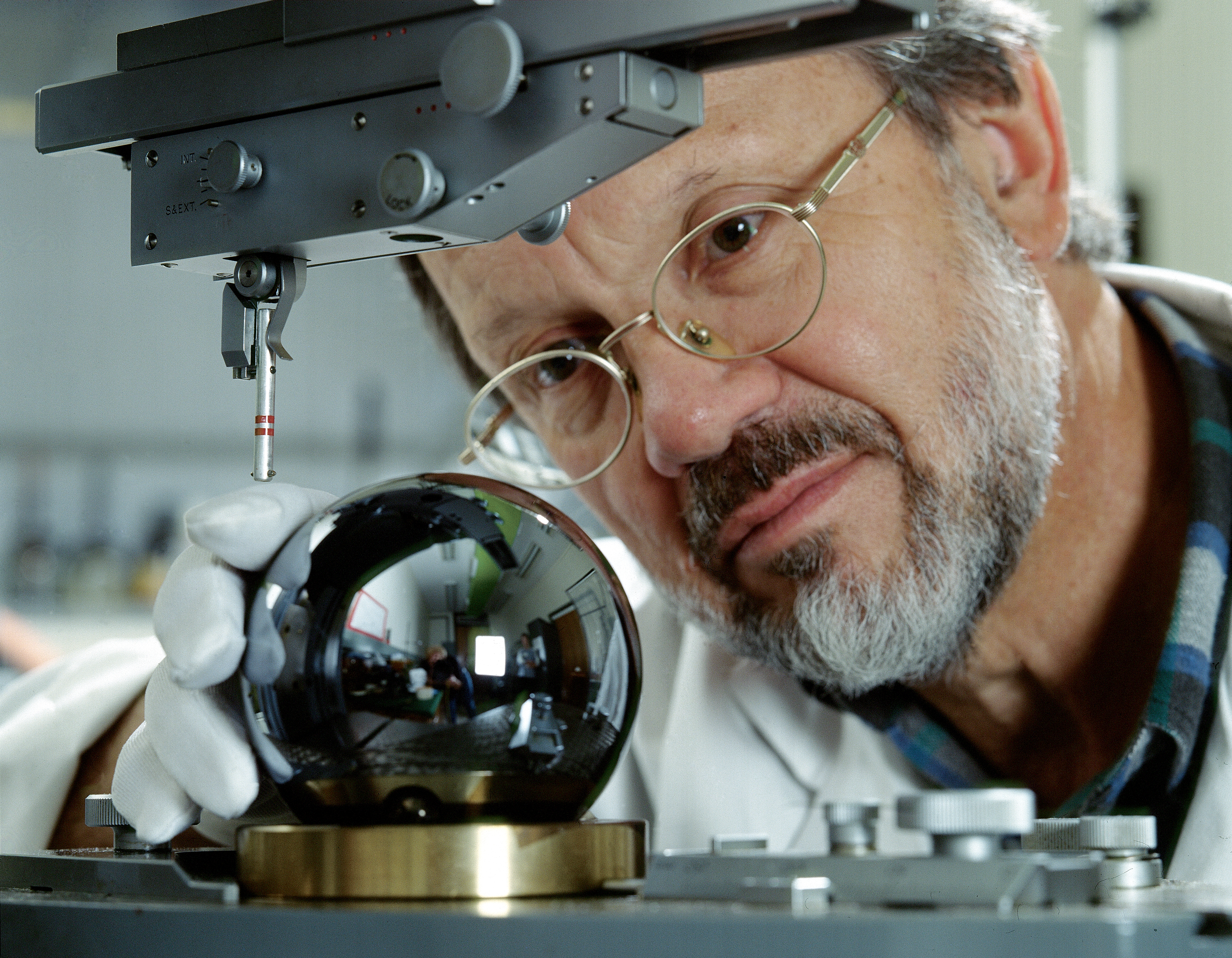
Silicon sphere used in the Avogadro project being inspected by Achim Leistner.

Achim Leistner is an Australian optician of German origin. During his retirement, he was asked to join the Avogadro project to craft a silicon sphere with high smoothness.

Leistner studied optics at Optik Carl Zeiss in Jena, Germany, and in 1953 qualified as a precision optical craftsman. He moved to Australia in 1957, and worked in CSIRO on optical fabrication methods.

In addition to precision instruments, Leistner uses his hands to feel for irregularities in the roundness of the sphere. The research team has called his extraordinary sense of touch "atomic feeling". As a result the sphere is the roundest man-made object ever. If it were scaled to the size of the Earth, it would have a high point of only 2.4 m (7 ft 10 in) above "sea level". (Note: The sphere shown in the photographs has an out-of-roundness value (peak to valley on the radius) of 50 nm (2.0×10^{−6} in). According to ACPO, they improved on that with an out-of-roundness of 35 nm (1.4×10^{−6} in). On the 93.6 mm (3.69 in) diameter sphere, an out-of-roundness of 35 nm (1.4×10^{−6} in) (deviation of ±17.5 nm (6.9×10^{−7} in) from the average) is a fractional roundness (∆r/r) = 3.7×10^{−7}. Scaled to the size of Earth, this is equivalent to a maximum deviation from sea level of only 2.4 m (7 ft 10 in). The roundness of that ACPO sphere is exceeded only by two of the four fused-quartz gyroscope rotors flown on Gravity Probe B, which were manufactured in the late 1990s and given their final figure at the W.W. Hansen Experimental Physics Lab at Stanford University. Particularly, "Gyro 4" is recorded in the Guinness database of world records (their database, not in their book) as the world's roundest man-made object. According to a published report (221 kB PDF, here ) and the GP‑B public affairs coordinator at Stanford University, of the four gyroscopes onboard the probe, Gyro 4 has a maximum surface undulation from a perfect sphere of 3.4 nm (1.3×10^{−7} in)±0.4 nm (1.6×10^{−8} in) on the 38.1 mm (1.50 in) diameter sphere, which is a ∆r/r = 1.8×10^{−7}. Scaled to the size of Earth, this is equivalent to a deviation the size of North America rising slowly up out of the sea (in molecular-layer terraces 11.9 cm (4.7 in) high), reaching a maximum elevation of 1.14 m (3 ft 9 in)±0.13 m (5.1 in) in Nebraska, and then gradually sloping back down to sea level on the other side of the continent.)

== Awards and recognition ==
Leistner holds certificates in precision optics, geometrical optics, optical design drawing, and mathematics from Optic Carl Zeiss Jena Technical College. He has served as a member of the Australian Optical Society and on international conference working committees for SPIE and the Optical Society of America.

In 2000 he was awarded OSA's David Richardson Medal, "for the development of novel optical fabrication techniques and the design improvement of optical test equipment. By refining the Teflon lap polishing technique and performing research into the mechanism of optical polishing, he has improved the quality and precision of superpolished optical surfaces, pushing the accuracy of shapes and surface roughness down to nearly atomic dimensions."

In 2010 he became an Honorary Fellow with the CSIRO Division of Material Science and Engineering
