= IM Pegasi =

Star in the constellation Pegasus

- Location of IM Pegasi (circled)

Observation data Epoch J2000.0 Equinox ICRS
- Constellation: Pegasus
- Right ascension: 22^{h} 53^{m} 02.26608^{s}
- Declination: +16° 50′ 28.2969″
- Apparent magnitude (V): 5.55 (5.60 – 5.85)

Characteristics
- Spectral type: K2 III + dG
- Variable type: RS CVn

Astrometry
Radial velocity (R_{v})	−14.43 km/s
Proper motion (μ)	RA: −20.73 mas/yr Dec.: −27.75 mas/yr
Parallax (π)	11.17±0.33 mas
Distance	292 ± 9 ly (90 ± 3 pc)

Orbit
Period (P)	24.64877±0.00003 d
Eccentricity (e)	0.00
Inclination (i)	65° ≤ i ≤ 80°°
Semi-amplitude (K_{1}) (primary)	34.29±0.04 km/s
Semi-amplitude (K_{2}) (secondary)	62.31±0.06 km/s

Details

primary
Mass	1.8 ± 0.2 M_{☉}
Radius	13.3 ± 0.6 R_{☉}
Luminosity	54 ± 9 L_{☉}
Temperature	4,550 ± 50 K
Rotation	24.4936 days

secondary
Mass	1.0 ± 0.07 M_{☉}
Radius	1.00 R_{☉}
Luminosity	0.9 ± 0.3 L_{☉}
Temperature	5,650 ± 200 K

Other designations
- IM Peg, HD 216489, HIP 112997, HR 8703, SAO 108231

Database references
SIMBAD	data

IM Pegasi is a variable binary star system approximately 329 light-years away in the constellation of Pegasus. With an apparent magnitude of 5.7, it is visible to the naked eye. Increased public awareness of it is due to its use as the guide star for the Gravity Probe B general relativity experiment. It was chosen for this purpose because its microwave radio emissions are observable with a large radio telescope network on the ground in such a manner that its precise position can be related by interferometry to distant quasars.

The two components of the binary system includes a K-type giant star and a G-type main sequence star. The primary star is estimated to be 1.8 times as massive and 13 times the diameter of the Sun. The secondary star is estimated to be similar to the Sun in size and mass. They orbit their common barycenter in a period precisely estimated to be 24.64877 days.

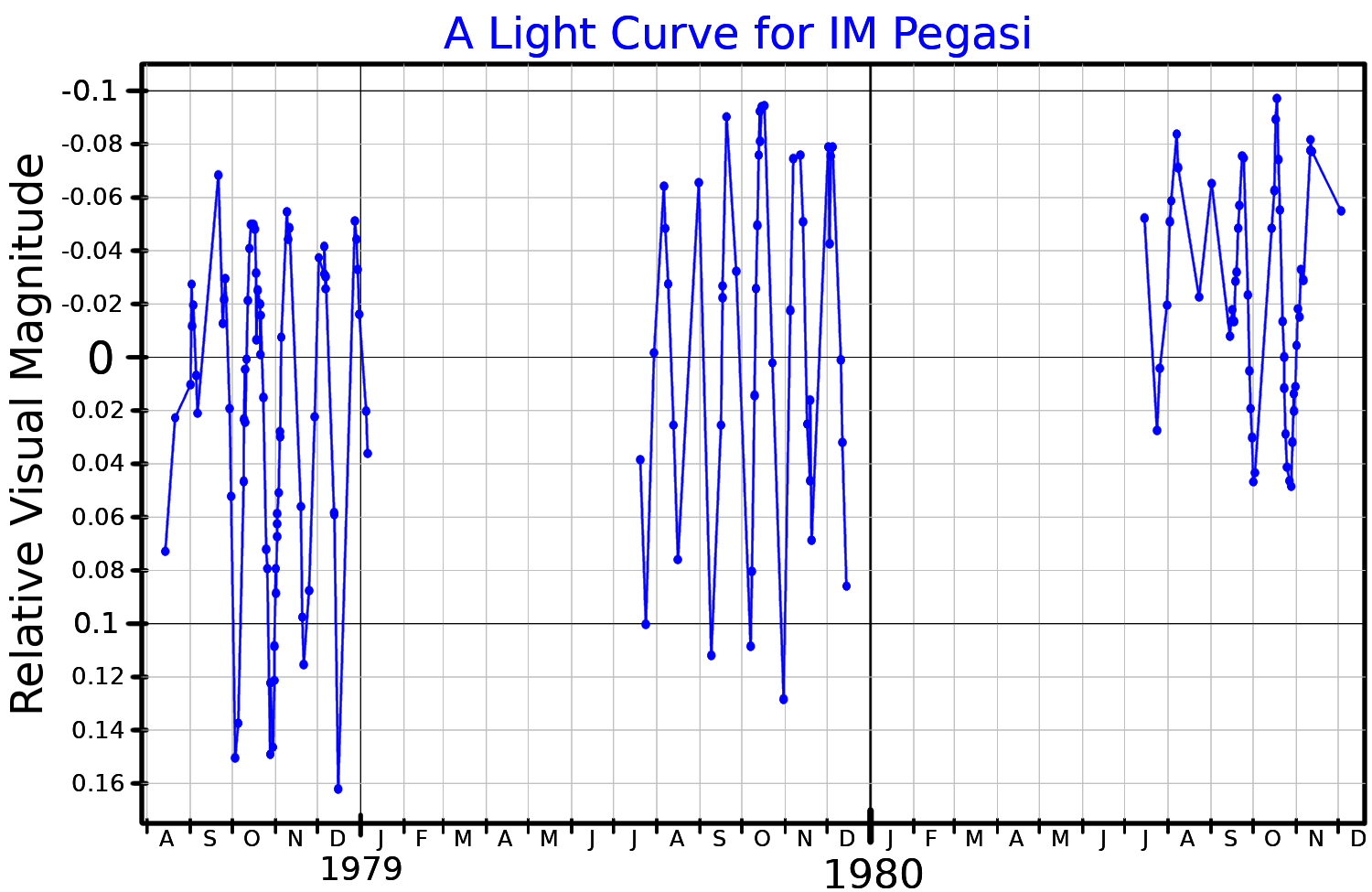
A visual band light curve for IM Pegasi, adapted from Eaton et al. (1983)

The variability of IM Pegasi is due to the active chromosphere of the giant primary star, which causes brightness changes of a few tenths of a magnitude as it rotates.
