= Alternative approaches to redefining the kilogram =

The scientific community examined several approaches to redefining the kilogram before deciding on a revision of the SI in November 2018. Each approach had advantages and disadvantages.

Prior to the redefinition, the kilogram and several other SI units based on the kilogram were defined by an artificial metal object called the international prototype of the kilogram (IPK). There was broad agreement that the older definition of the kilogram should be replaced.

The SI system after the 2019 revision: the kilogram is now fixed in terms of the second, the metre and the Planck constant.

The International Committee for Weights and Measures (CIPM) approved a redefinition of the SI base units in November 2018 that defines the kilogram as the fixed numerical value of the Planck constant "$h$" which is exactly equal to 6.62607015×10^{−34} J⋅Hz^{−1}. This approach effectively defines the kilogram in terms of the second and the metre, and took effect on 20 May 2019.

In 1960, the metre, previously similarly having been defined with reference to a single platinum-iridium bar with two marks on it, was redefined in terms of an invariant physical constant (the wavelength of a particular emission of light emitted by krypton, and later the speed of light) so that the standard can be independently reproduced in different laboratories by following a written specification.

At the 94th Meeting of the International Committee for Weights and Measures (CIPM) in 2005, it was recommended that the same be done with the kilogram.

In October 2010, the CIPM voted to submit a resolution for consideration at the General Conference on Weights and Measures (CGPM), to "take note of an intention" that the kilogram be defined in terms of the Planck constant, h (which has dimensions of energy times time) together with other physical constants. This resolution was accepted by the 24th conference of the CGPM in October 2011 and further discussed at the 25th conference in 2014. Although the Committee recognised that significant progress had been made, they concluded that the data did not yet appear sufficiently robust to adopt the revised definition, and that work should continue to enable the adoption at the 26th meeting, scheduled for 2018. Such a definition would theoretically permit any apparatus that was capable of delineating the kilogram in terms of the Planck constant to be used as long as it possessed sufficient precision, accuracy and stability. The Kibble balance is one way to do this.

As part of this project, a variety of very different technologies and approaches were considered and explored over many years. Some of these approaches were based on equipment and procedures that would have enabled the reproducible production of new, kilogram-mass prototypes on demand using measurement techniques and material properties that are ultimately based on, or traceable to, physical constants. Others were based on devices that measured either the acceleration or weight of hand-tuned kilogram test masses and which expressed their magnitudes in electrical terms via special components that permit traceability to physical constants. Such approaches depend on converting a weight measurement to a mass, and therefore require the precise measurement of the strength of gravity in laboratories. All approaches would have precisely fixed one or more constants of nature at a defined value.

== Kibble balance ==
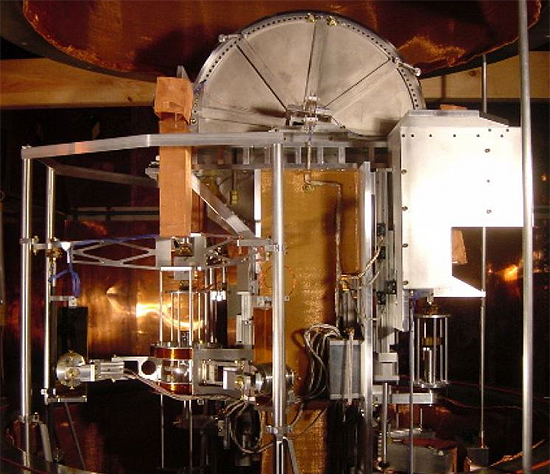
The NIST's Kibble balance is a project of the US government to develop an "electronic kilogram". The vacuum chamber dome, which lowers over the entire apparatus, is visible at top.

The Kibble balance (known as a "watt balance" before 2016) is essentially a single-pan weighing scale that measures the electric power necessary to oppose the weight of a kilogram test mass as it is pulled by Earth's gravity. It is a variation of an ampere balance, with an extra calibration step that eliminates the effect of geometry. The electric potential in the Kibble balance is delineated by a Josephson voltage standard, which allows voltage to be linked to an invariant constant of nature with extremely high precision and stability. Its circuit resistance is calibrated against a quantum Hall effect resistance standard.

The Kibble balance requires extremely precise measurement of the local gravitational acceleration g in the laboratory, using a gravimeter. For instance when the elevation of the centre of the gravimeter differs from that of the nearby test mass in the Kibble balance, the NIST compensates for Earth's gravity gradient of 309 μGal/m, which affects the weight of a one-kilogram test mass by about 316 μg/m.

In April 2007, the NIST's implementation of the Kibble balance demonstrated a combined relative standard uncertainty (CRSU) of 36 μg. (Note: The combined relative standard uncertainty (CRSU) of these measurements, as with all other tolerances and uncertainties in this article unless otherwise noted, are at one standard deviation (1σ), which equates to a confidence level of about 68%; that is to say, 68% of the measurements fall within the stated tolerance.) The UK's National Physical Laboratory's Kibble balance demonstrated a CRSU of 70.3 μg in 2007. That Kibble balance was disassembled and shipped in 2009 to Canada's Institute for National Measurement Standards (part of the National Research Council), where research and development with the device could continue.

The virtue of electronic realisations like the Kibble balance is that the definition and dissemination of the kilogram no longer depends upon the stability of kilogram prototypes, which must be very carefully handled and stored. It frees physicists from the need to rely on assumptions about the stability of those prototypes. Instead, hand-tuned, close-approximation mass standards can simply be weighed and documented as being equal to one kilogram plus an offset value. With the Kibble balance, while the kilogram is delineated in electrical and gravity terms, all of which are traceable to invariants of nature; it is defined in a manner that is directly traceable to three fundamental constants of nature. The Planck constant defines the kilogram in terms of the second and the metre. By fixing the Planck constant, the definition of the kilogram depends in addition only on the definitions of the second and the metre. The definition of the second depends on a single defined physical constant: the ground state hyperfine splitting frequency of the caesium-133 atom Δν(^{133}Cs)_{hfs}. The metre depends on the second and on an additional defined physical constant: the speed of light c. With the kilogram redefined in this manner, physical objects such as the IPK are no longer part of the definition, but instead become transfer standards.

Scales like the Kibble balance also permit more flexibility in choosing materials with especially desirable properties for mass standards. For instance, Pt‑10Ir could continue to be used so that the specific gravity of newly produced mass standards would be the same as existing national primary and check standards (≈21.55 g/ml). This would reduce the relative uncertainty when making mass comparisons in air. Alternatively, entirely different materials and constructions could be explored with the objective of producing mass standards with greater stability. For instance, osmium-iridium alloys could be investigated if platinum's propensity to absorb hydrogen (due to catalysis of VOCs and hydrocarbon-based cleaning solvents) and atmospheric mercury proved to be sources of instability. Also, vapor-deposited, protective ceramic coatings like nitrides could be investigated for their suitability for chemically isolating these new alloys.

The challenge with Kibble balances is not only in reducing their uncertainty, but also in making them practical realisations of the kilogram. Nearly every aspect of Kibble balances and their support equipment requires such precise and accurate technology that—unlike a device like an atomic clock—few countries currently fund their operation. For instance, the NIST's Kibble balance used four resistance standards in 2007, each of which was rotated through the Kibble balance every two to six weeks after being calibrated in a different part of NIST headquarters facility in Gaithersburg, Maryland. It was found that simply moving the resistance standards down the hall to the Kibble balance after calibration altered their values 10 ppb (equivalent to 10 μg) or more. Present-day technology is insufficient to permit stable operation of Kibble balances between even biannual calibrations. When the new definition takes effect, it is likely there will only be a few at most Kibble balances initially operating in the world.

== Other approaches ==
Several alternative approaches to redefining the kilogram that were fundamentally different from the Kibble balance were explored to varying degrees, with some abandoned. The Avogadro project, in particular, was important for the 2018 redefinition decision because it provided an accurate measurement of the Planck constant that was consistent with and independent of the Kibble balance method.

== Historical proposals and realization methods ==
Since 20 May 2019, the kilogram (kg) has been defined by fixing the numerical value of the Planck constant, $h$ = 6.62607015×10^{−34} J⋅Hz^{−1}, with realizations based on electromechanical experiments (Kibble balances) and on X-ray crystal density (XRCD) measurements of silicon spheres. The approaches below are retained as historical proposals that informed the redefinition and/or as realization methods used after 2019.

=== Avogadro project (XRCD realization) ===
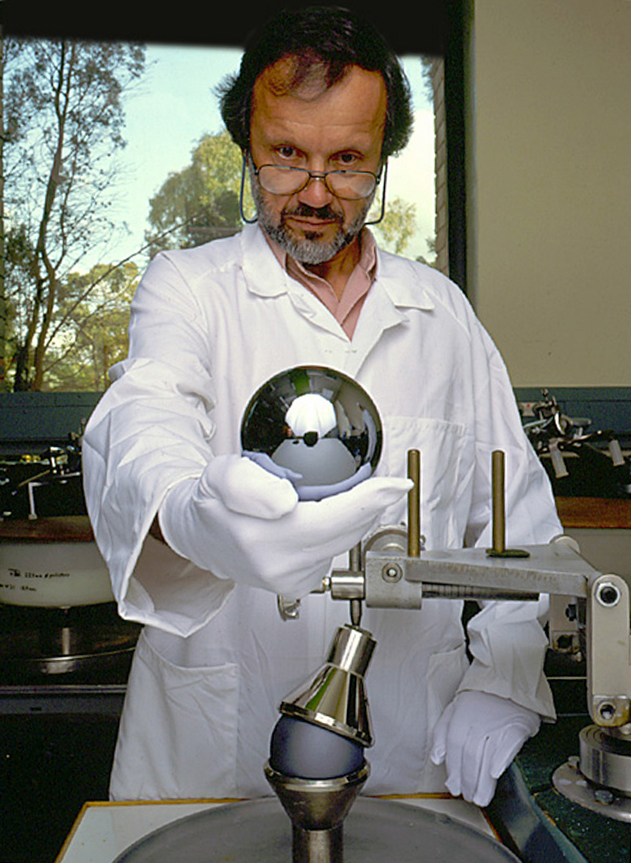
Achim Leistner at the Australian Centre for Precision Optics (ACPO) holds a 1 kg, single-crystal silicon sphere for the Avogadro project. Among the roundest man-made objects in the world, the sphere scaled to the size of Earth would have a high point of only 2.4 metres above "sea level". (Note: The sphere shown in the photograph has an out-of-roundness value (peak to valley on the radius) of 50 nm. According to ACPO, they improved on that with an out-of-roundness of 35 nm. On the 93.6 mm diameter sphere, an out-of-roundness of 35 nm (deviation of ±17.5 nm from the average) is a fractional roundness $\frac{\Delta r}{r}=3.7\times10^{-7}$. Scaled to the size of Earth, this is equivalent to a maximum deviation from sea level of only 2.4 m. The roundness of that ACPO sphere is exceeded only by two of the four fused-quartz gyroscope rotors flown on Gravity Probe B, which were manufactured in the late 1990s and given their final figure at the W.W. Hansen Experimental Physics Lab at Stanford University. Particularly, "Gyro 4" is recorded in the Guinness database of world records (their database, not in their book) as the world's roundest man-made object. According to a published report (221 kB PDF, here ) and the GP‑B public affairs coordinator at Stanford University, of the four gyroscopes onboard the probe, Gyro 4 has a maximum surface undulation from a perfect sphere of 3.4±0.4 nm on the 38.1 mm diameter sphere, which is a $\frac{\Delta r}{r}=1.8\times10^{-7}$ Scaled to the size of Earth, this is equivalent to a deviation the size of North America rising slowly up out of the sea (in molecular-layer terraces 11.9 cm high), reaching a maximum elevation of 1.14±0.13 m in Nebraska, and then gradually sloping back down to sea level on the other side of the continent.)

The International Avogadro Coordination (IAC) produced highly enriched ^{28}Si single-crystal spheres and measured their volume, lattice spacing and isotopic composition to determine the Avogadro constant by the X-ray crystal density (XRCD) method. These results, together with Kibble-balance measurements, provided the consistency needed to redefine the SI in 2019 by fixing $h$. After 2019, XRCD remains one of the accepted methods to realize the kilogram (i.e., to produce a mass value traceable to the fixed constants).

=== Carbon-12 ===
Prior to 2019, several proposals explored defining the kilogram via a fixed Avogadro constant and a specified number of ^{12}C atoms. With the 2019 revision, the Avogadro constant (N_{A} = 6.02214076×10^{23} mol^{−1}) and Planck constant ($h$) were both assigned exact values; the kilogram is now defined via $h$, while $N_A$ underpins the definition of the mole.

=== Ion accumulation (historical) ===
Experimental studies investigated defining a mass by counting deposited ions (e.g., Au or Bi) via electrical current, but the approach did not achieve the reproducibility and practicality required and was not adopted for the SI redefinition.

=== Ampere-based force concepts ===
Some proposals explored defining the kilogram through electromechanical force/acceleration relationships. In practice, the 2019 definition fixes $h$ and is realized with Kibble balances that equate mechanical and electrical power under quantum-electrical standards.
