= Bryan Kibble =

British metrologist (1938–2016)

Bryan Peter Kibble
- Born: 20 October 1938; Letcombe Regis, Berkshire, England (Oxfordshire since 1974)
- Died: 28 April 2016 (aged 77)
- Education: Abingdon School, Jesus College, Oxford
- Occupation: Physicist
- Employer: National Physical Laboratory

Bryan Peter Kibble (20 October 1938 – 28 April 2016) was a British physicist and a pioneering metrologist. He was the inventor of the Kibble balance, an improved version of the current balance, developed for the realisation of the S.I. unit of mass, the kilogram.

== Early years and family ==
Kibble was born in Letcombe Regis (formerly in Berkshire, now part of Oxfordshire) to Ellen and Herbert Kibble. His father was a police sergeant. He was the youngest of four children. From an early age he enjoyed repairing electrical and mechanical devices. He attended Abingdon School from 1950 to 1957, where he was a house prefect and gained significant academic success. He won numerous prizes for physics, mathematics and science and was awarded a Bennett Scholarship. He was a member of the Debating and Roysse Society in addition to playing for the hockey and rugby teams.

He was awarded an open scholarship to study Natural Science at Jesus College, Oxford. He met his future wife, Anne Greenfield, there and they married in 1964, the same year that he was awarded his DPhil on the subject of atomic spectroscopy. They had three children, Paul, Nicola and Stephen.

== Career ==
Kibble moved to Canada after completing his DPhil as a post-doctoral fellow at the University of Windsor, Ontario. Two years later, he returned to England and spent the following thirty years at the National Physical Laboratory (NPL) in Teddington as a senior research fellow.

In 1970, with G. J. Hunt, he measured the gyromagnetic ratio of the proton, which highlighted previous errors and greatly improved work on the S.I. definition of the ampère. The realisation of the ampère had been made with a current balance, a device that is difficult to use and contains inherent problems, including that the dimensions of the coils therein need to be measured accurately.

=== The Kibble balance ===
Kibble worked with Greville Rayner on coaxial a.c. bridges and the calculable capacitor from which the ohm could be realised, publishing in 1984. Prior to this he had been exercised by the problems with the current balance and had ideas for its improvement. Supported in his thinking during a visit by Robert D. Cutkosky of the National Institute of Standards and Technology of the US, Kibble invented the moving-coil watt balance in 1975. In 1978 the Mark I watt balance was built at NPL with Ian Robinson and Ray Smith. A more accurate realisation of the ampère was made, therefore the current balance had been superseded. This development led to the internationally accepted setting of the conventional Josephson and von Klitzing constants in 1990, obviating any further justification for national representations of these values which had previously inhibited trade. International teams developed their own versions of the balance.

In 1990, the Mark II watt balance was built, with the intent of measuring the Planck constant accurately enough to redefine the S.I. unit of the kilogramme from fundamental constants. Such an instrument equalises one force with another, specifically the weight of a [one-kilogramme, typically] test mass and the force produced by an electric current in a moving coil in a magnetic field. The magnitude of the upward force on the coil is controlled by changes to the current. The power of the moving mass is equal to the product of the current and potential difference measured in the coil, hence the term 'watt' balance (as the S.I. unit of power is the watt (W)).

To remove the inaccuracies due to measurements of the coil and the magnet, a second step involves moving the coil at a particular velocity through the magnetic field – without the test mass present or an applied current – and measuring the induced potential difference. The current is measured with a resistor, using the von Klitzing constant through the quantum Hall effect, and the potential difference is measured using the Josephson effect. Electrical power can be measured using the Planck constant and time, meaning that the S.I. units of length and time can be related to the mass along with the Planck constant, finally eliminating the need for usage of the platinum-iridium cylinder held at the International Bureau of Weights and Measures (B.I.P.M.) in Paris for the realisation of the S.I. unit of the kilogramme.

On 16 November 2018, at a meeting of the General Conference on Weights and Measures in Versailles, France, representatives of 60 countries voted to reform S.I. units permanently. The kilogramme will forthwith be defined using the Planck constant.

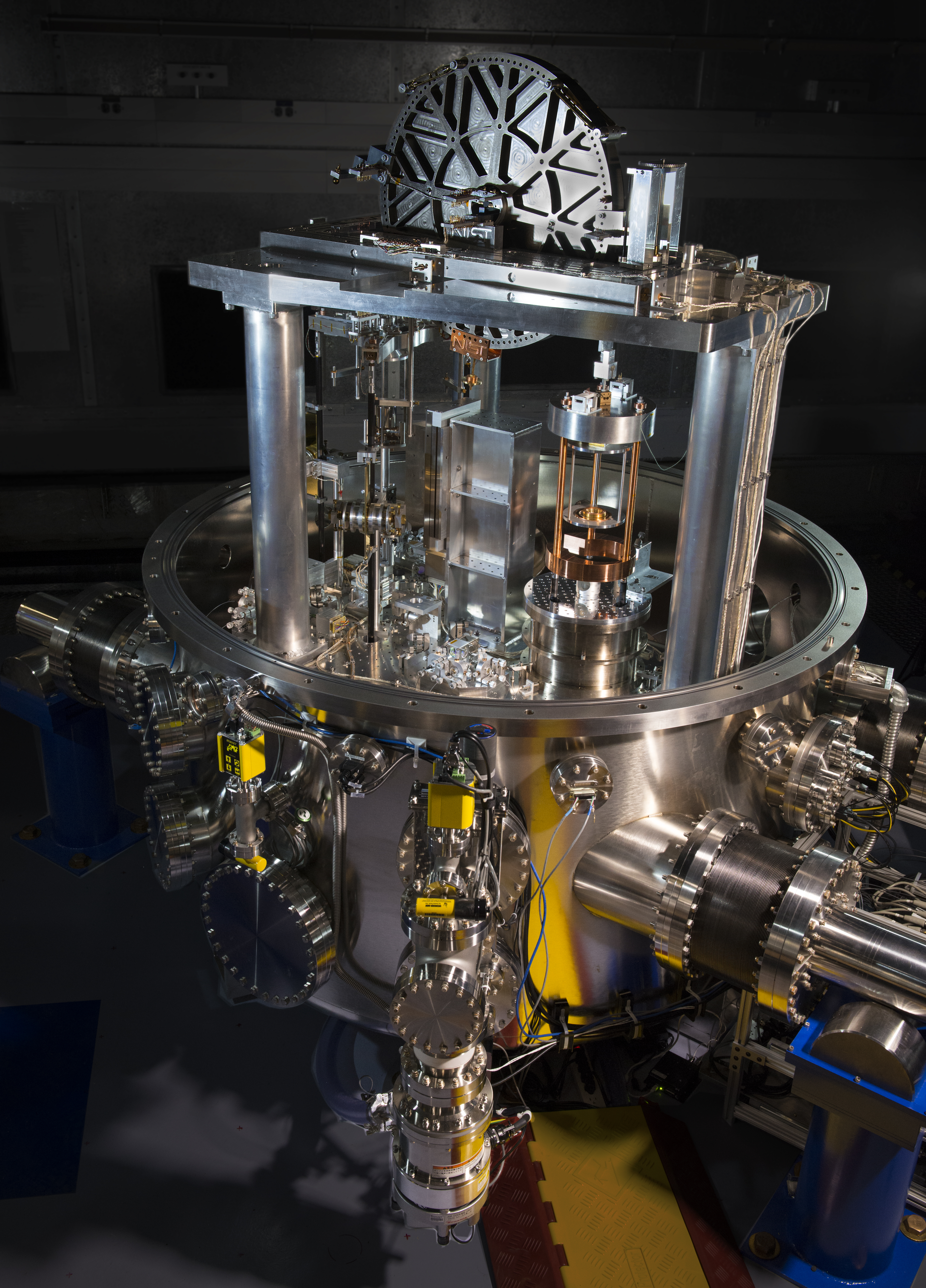
The NIST-4 Kibble balance

== Later years ==
Kibble retired from N.P.L. in 1998, but continued to work in the field at N.P.L., the Physikalisch-Technische Bundesanstalt in Braunschweig, the B.I.P.M., and he also visited many other metrological institutions worldwide with his wife, Anne. From 2009, he wrote for the IEEE Instrumentation and Measurement Magazine. In 2010, he published Coaxial Electrical Circuits for Interference-Free Measurements with Jurgen Schurr and Shakil Awan.

In 2014, Kibble and Robinson wrote an article in Metrologia showing how to build an accurate Kibble balance to encourage other metrologists worldwide to build their own. His final lecture at N.P.L. was in March 2016.

== Other interests ==
Kibble enjoyed playing the clarinet, umpiring hockey matches, and genealogy.

== Legacy ==
Two months after Kibble's death, at a meeting of the Consultative Committee for Units of the C.I.P.M., the watt balance was renamed the Kibble balance to honour its inventor and developer.

== Awards ==
- Gabor Medal and Prize (formerly the Duddell Medal and Prize), 1986
- I.U.P.A.C. SUNAMCO Senior Scientist Medal, 1992
- IEEE Joseph F. Keithley Award in Instrumentation and Measurement, 2009

== See also ==
- List of Old Abingdonians
