= Kibble balance =

Electromechanical weight measuring instrument

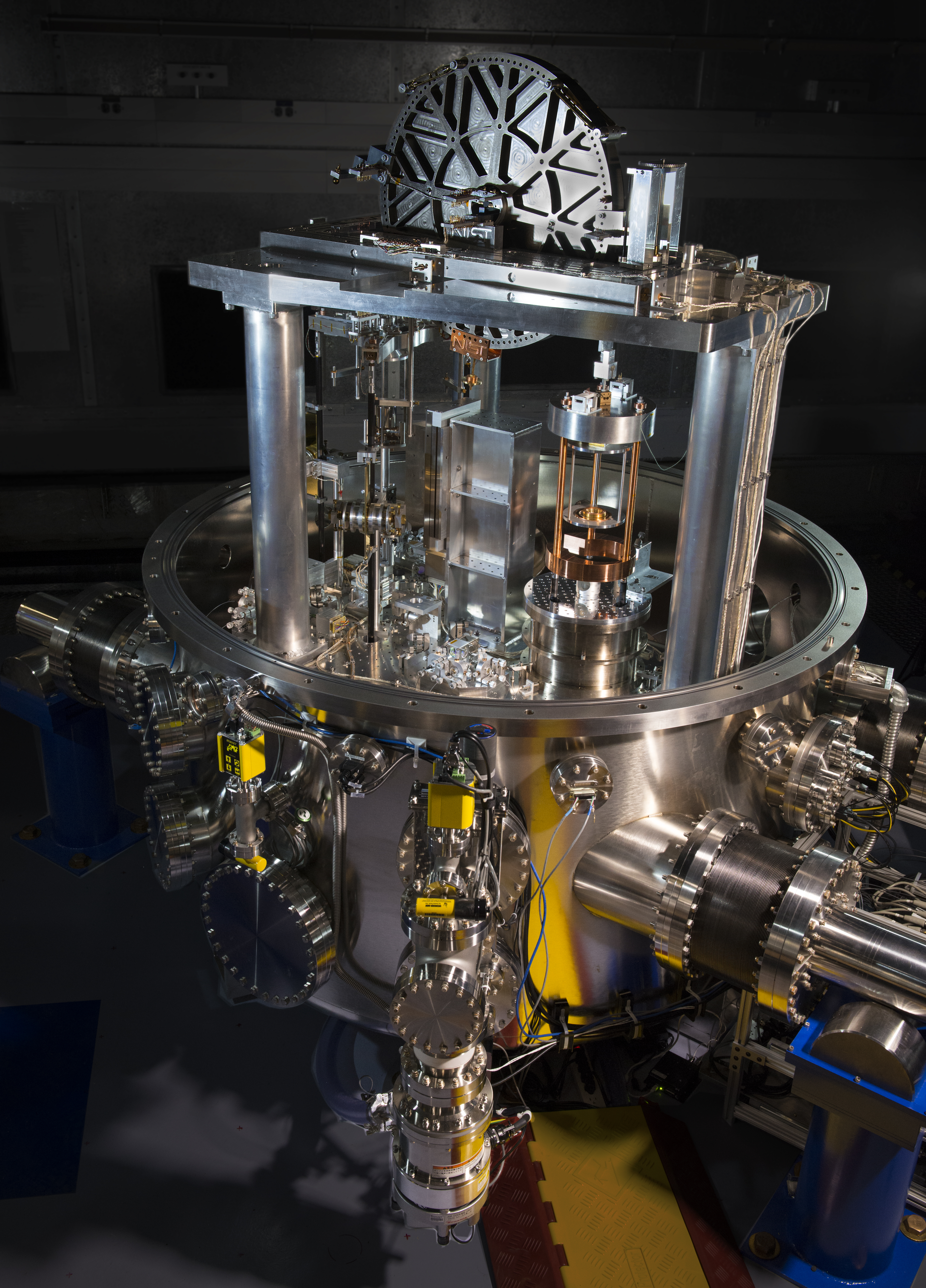
The NIST-4 Kibble balance, which began full operation in early 2015, measured the Planck constant to within 13 parts per billion in 2017, which was accurate enough to assist with the 2019 redefinition of the kilogram.

A Kibble balance (also formerly known as a watt balance) is an electromechanical measuring instrument that measures the weight of a test object very precisely by the electric current and voltage needed to produce a compensating force. It is a metrological instrument that can realize the definition of the kilogram unit of mass based on fundamental constants.

It was originally known as a watt balance because the weight of the test mass is proportional to the product of current and voltage, which is measured in watts. In June 2016, two months after the death of its inventor, Bryan Kibble, metrologists of the Consultative Committee for Units of the International Committee for Weights and Measures agreed to rename the device in his honor.

Prior to 2019, the definition of the kilogram was based on a physical object known as the International Prototype of the Kilogram (IPK). After considering alternatives, in 2013 the General Conference on Weights and Measures (CGPM) agreed on accuracy criteria for replacing this definition with one based on the use of a Kibble balance. After these criteria had been achieved, the CGPM voted unanimously on November 16, 2018, to change the definition of the kilogram and several other units, effective May 20, 2019, to coincide with World Metrology Day. There is also a method called the joule balance. All methods that use the fixed numerical value of the Planck constant are sometimes called the Planck balance.

== Design ==
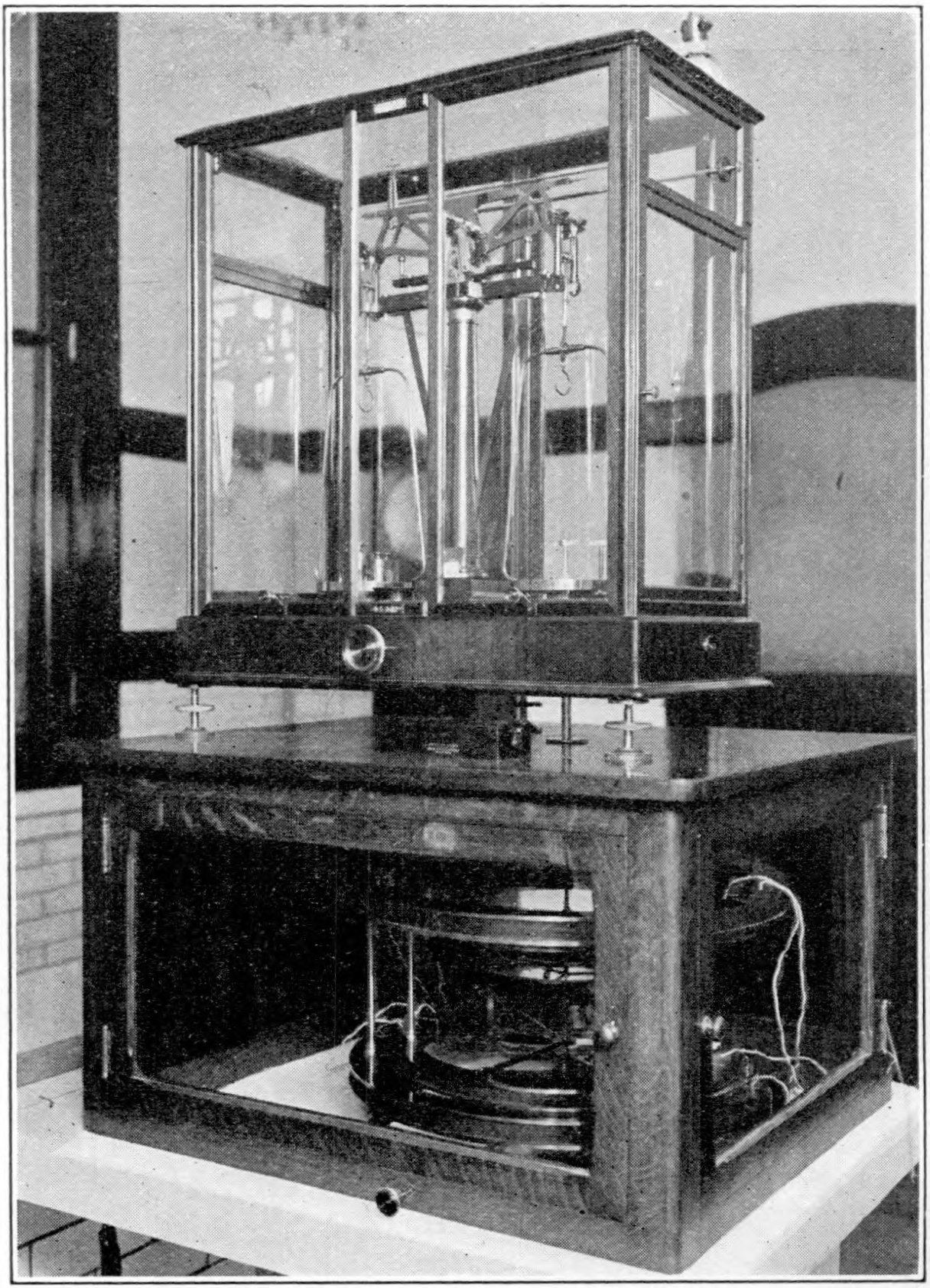
Precision ampere balance at the US National Bureau of Standards (now NIST) in 1927. The current coils are visible under the balance, attached to the right balance arm. The Kibble balance is a development of the Ampere balance.

The Kibble balance is an advanced and highly precise development of the earlier ampere balance, an instrument in which the force generated between two current-carrying coils is measured to determine the magnitude of an electric current. In contrast, the Kibble balance operates inversely: the current flowing through its coils is set with high precision using the fixed value of the Planck constant, and the resulting electromagnetic force is used to balance the weight of a test mass. The mass of the object is then determined by combining the electromagnetic measurements with an accurate determination of the local gravitational acceleration—including gravitational and centrifugal components—obtained using a gravimeter. This allows the mass to be defined in terms of electrical quantities such as current and voltage, enabling the instrument to "measure mass without recourse to the IPK (International Prototype Kilogram) or any physical object".

== Origin ==
The principle that is used in the Kibble balance was proposed by Bryan Kibble (1938-2016) of the UK National Physical Laboratory (NPL) in 1975 for measurement of the gyromagnetic ratio. In 1978 the Mark I watt balance was built at the NPL with Ian Robinson and Ray Smith. It operated until 1988.

The main weakness of the ampere balance method is that the result depends on the accuracy with which the dimensions of the coils are measured. The Kibble balance uses an extra calibration step to cancel the effect of the geometry of the coils, removing the main source of uncertainty. This extra step involves moving the force coil through a known magnetic flux at a known speed. This was possible by setting of the conventional values of the von Klitzing constant and Josephson constant, which are used throughout the world for voltage and resistance calibration. Using these principles, in 1990 Bryan Kibble and Ian Robinson invented the Kibble Mark II balance, which uses a circular coil and operates in vacuum conditions. Bryan Kibble worked with Ian Robinson and Janet Belliss to build this Mark Two version of the balance. This design allowed for measurements accurate enough for use in the redefinition of the SI unit of mass: the kilogram.

The Kibble balance originating from the National Physical Laboratory was transferred to the National Research Council of Canada (NRC) in 2009, where scientists from the two labs continued to refine the instrument. In 2014, NRC researchers published the most accurate measurement of the Planck constant at that time, with a relative uncertainty of 1.8×10^{−8}. A final paper by NRC researchers was published in May 2017, presenting a measurement of the Planck constant with an uncertainty of only 9.1 parts per billion, the measurement with the least uncertainty to that date. Other Kibble balance experiments are conducted in the US National Institute of Standards and Technology (NIST), the Swiss Federal Office of Metrology (METAS) in Berne, the International Bureau of Weights and Measures (BIPM) near Paris and Laboratoire national de métrologie et d'essais (LNE) in Trappes, France.

== Principle ==
A conducting wire of length $L$ that carries an electric current $I$ perpendicular to a magnetic field of strength $B$ experiences a Lorentz force equal to the product of these variables. In the Kibble balance, the current is varied so that this force counteracts the weight $w$ of a mass $m$ to be measured. This principle is derived from the ampere balance. $w$ is given by the mass $m$ multiplied by the local gravitational acceleration $g$. Thus,

$$w = mg = BLI.$$

The Kibble balance avoids the problems of measuring $B$ and $L$ in a second calibration step. The same wire (in practice, a coil) is moved through the same magnetic field at a known speed $v$. By Faraday's law of induction, a potential difference $U$ is generated across the ends of the wire, which equals $BLv$. Thus

$$U = BLv.$$

The unknown product $BL$ can be eliminated from the equations to give

$$UI = mgv$$
$$m = UI/gv.$$

With $U$, $I$, $g$, and $v$ accurately measured, this gives an accurate value for $m$. Both sides of the equation have the dimensions of power, measured in watts in the International System of Units; hence the original name "watt balance". The product $BL$, also called the geometric factor, is not trivially equal in both calibration steps. The geometric factor is only constant under certain stability conditions on the coil.

== Implementation ==
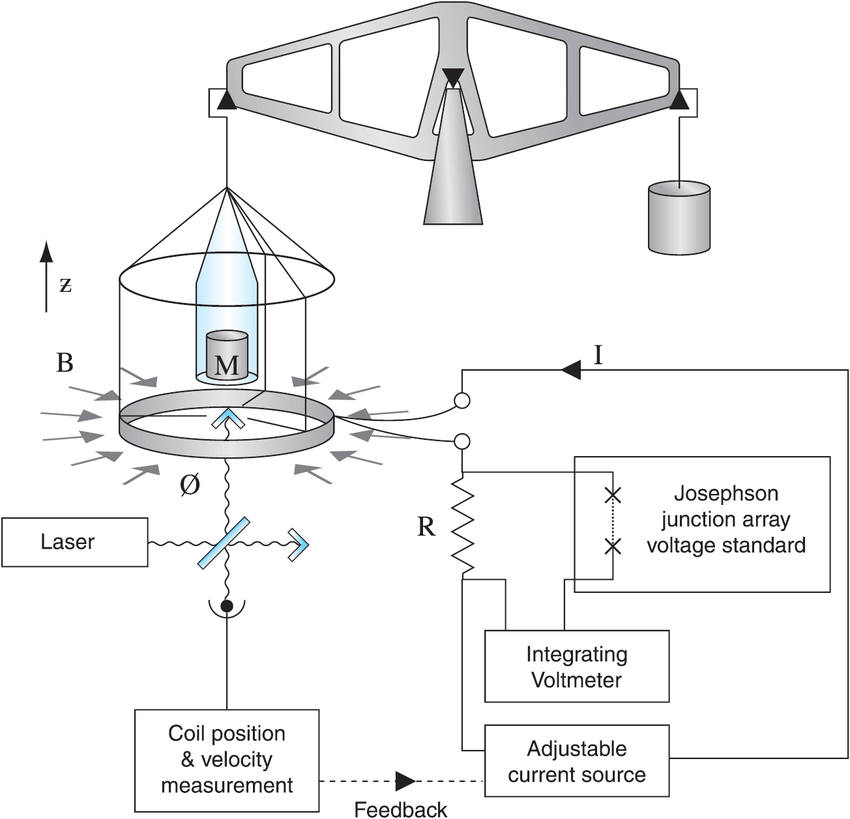
Weighing mode

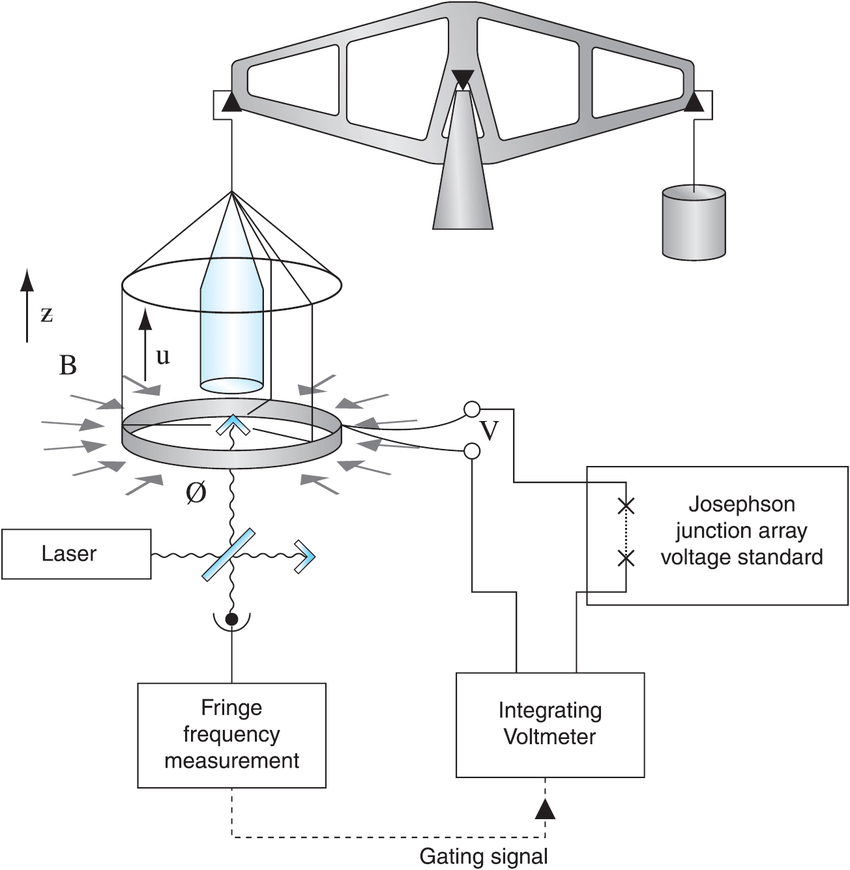
Moving mode

The Kibble balance is constructed so that the mass to be measured and the wire coil are suspended from one side of a balance scale, with a counterbalance mass on the other side. The system operates by alternating between two modes: "weighing" and "moving". The entire mechanical subsystem operates in a vacuum chamber to remove the effects of air buoyancy.

While "weighing", the system measures $I$, by controlling the current in the coil to keep the electromagnetic force on the coil balanced with the force of gravity. Coil position and velocity measurement circuitry uses an interferometer together with a precision clock input to determine the velocity and control the current needed to maintain it. The required current is measured, using an ammeter comprising a Josephson junction voltage standard and an integrating voltmeter.

While "moving", the system measures $U$ and $v$, by ceasing to provide current to the coil. This allows the counterbalance to pull the coil (and mass) upward through the magnetic field, which causes a voltage difference across the coil. The velocity measurement circuitry measures the speed $v$ of movement of the coil. This voltage is measured, using the same voltage standard and integrating voltmeter.

A typical Kibble balance measures $U$, $I$, and $v$, but does not measure the local gravitational acceleration $g$, because $g$ does not vary rapidly with time. Instead, $g$ is measured in the same laboratory using a highly accurate and precise gravimeter. In addition, the balance depends on a highly accurate and precise frequency reference such as an atomic clock to compute voltage and current. Thus, the precision and accuracy of the mass measurement depends on the Kibble balance, the gravimeter, and the clock.

Like the early atomic clocks, the early Kibble balances were one-of-a-kind experimental devices and were large, expensive, and delicate. As of 2019, work is underway to produce standardized devices at prices that permit use in any metrology laboratory that requires high-precision measurement of mass.

As well as large Kibble balances, microfabricated or MEMS watt balances (now called Kibble balances) have been demonstrated since around 2003. These are fabricated on single silicon dies similar to those used in microelectronics and accelerometers, and are capable of measuring small forces in the nanonewton to micronewton range traceably to the SI-defined physical constants via electrical and optical measurements. Due to their small scale, MEMS Kibble balances typically use electrostatic rather than the inductive forces used in larger instruments. Lateral and torsional variants have also been demonstrated, with the main application (as of 2019) being in the calibration of the atomic force microscope. Accurate measurements by several teams will enable their results to be averaged and so reduce the experimental error.

== Measurements ==
Accurate measurements of electric current and potential difference are made in conventional electrical units (rather than SI units), which are based on fixed "conventional values" of the Josephson constant and the von Klitzing constant, $K_\text{J-90}$ and $R_\text{K-90}$ respectively. The current Kibble balance experiments are equivalent to measuring the value of the conventional watt in SI units. From the definition of the conventional watt, this is equivalent to measuring the value of the product $K_\text{J}^2 R_\text{K}$ in SI units instead of its fixed value in conventional electrical units:

$$\frac{1}{K_\text{J}^2 R_\text{K}} = \frac{1}{K_\text{J-90}^2 R_\text{K-90}} \frac{\{mgv\}_\text{W}}{ \{UI \}_{W_{90}}}.$$

The importance of such measurements is that they are also a direct measurement of the Planck constant $h$:

$$h = \frac{4}{K_\text{J}^2 R_\text{K}}.$$

The principle of the electronic kilogram relies on the value of the Planck constant, which is as of 2019 an exact value. This is similar to the metre being defined by the speed of light. With the constant defined exactly, the Kibble balance is not an instrument to measure the Planck constant, but is instead an instrument to measure mass:

$$m = \frac{UI}{gv}.$$

== Effect of gravity ==
The local gravitational acceleration g is measured with exceptional precision with the help of a laser interferometer. The laser's pattern of interference fringes—the dark and light bands above—blooms at an ever-faster rate as a free-falling corner reflector drops inside an absolute gravimeter. The pattern's frequency sweep is timed by an atomic clock.

Gravity and the nature of the Kibble balance, which oscillates test masses up and down against the local gravitational acceleration g, are exploited so that mechanical power is compared against electrical power, which is the square of voltage divided by electrical resistance. However, g varies significantly—by nearly 1%—depending on where on the Earth's surface the measurement is made (see Earth's gravity). There are also slight seasonal variations in g at a location due to changes in underground water tables, and larger semimonthly and diurnal changes due to tidal distortions in the Earth's shape (earth tide and polar motion) caused by the Moon and the Sun. Although g is not a term in the definition of the kilogram, it is crucial in the process of measurement of the kilogram when relating energy to power in a Kibble balance. Accordingly, g must be measured with at least as much precision and accuracy as are the other terms, so measurements of g must also be traceable to fundamental constants of nature. For the most precise work in mass metrology, g is measured using dropping-mass absolute gravimeters that contain an iodine-stabilised helium–neon laser interferometer. The fringe-signal, frequency-sweep output from the interferometer is measured with a rubidium atomic clock. Since this type of dropping-mass gravimeter derives its accuracy and stability from the constancy of the speed of light as well as the innate properties of helium, neon, and rubidium atoms, the 'gravity' term in the delineation of an all-electronic kilogram is also measured in terms of invariants of nature—and with very high precision. For instance, in the basement of the NIST's Gaithersburg facility in 2009, when measuring the gravity acting upon Pt‑10Ir test masses (which are denser, smaller, and have a slightly lower center of gravity inside the Kibble balance than stainless steel masses), the measured value was typically within 8 ppb of 9.80101644 m/s^{2}.

== See also ==
- Alternative approaches to redefining the kilogram § Kibble balance
- Gouy balance
