= Ampere balance =

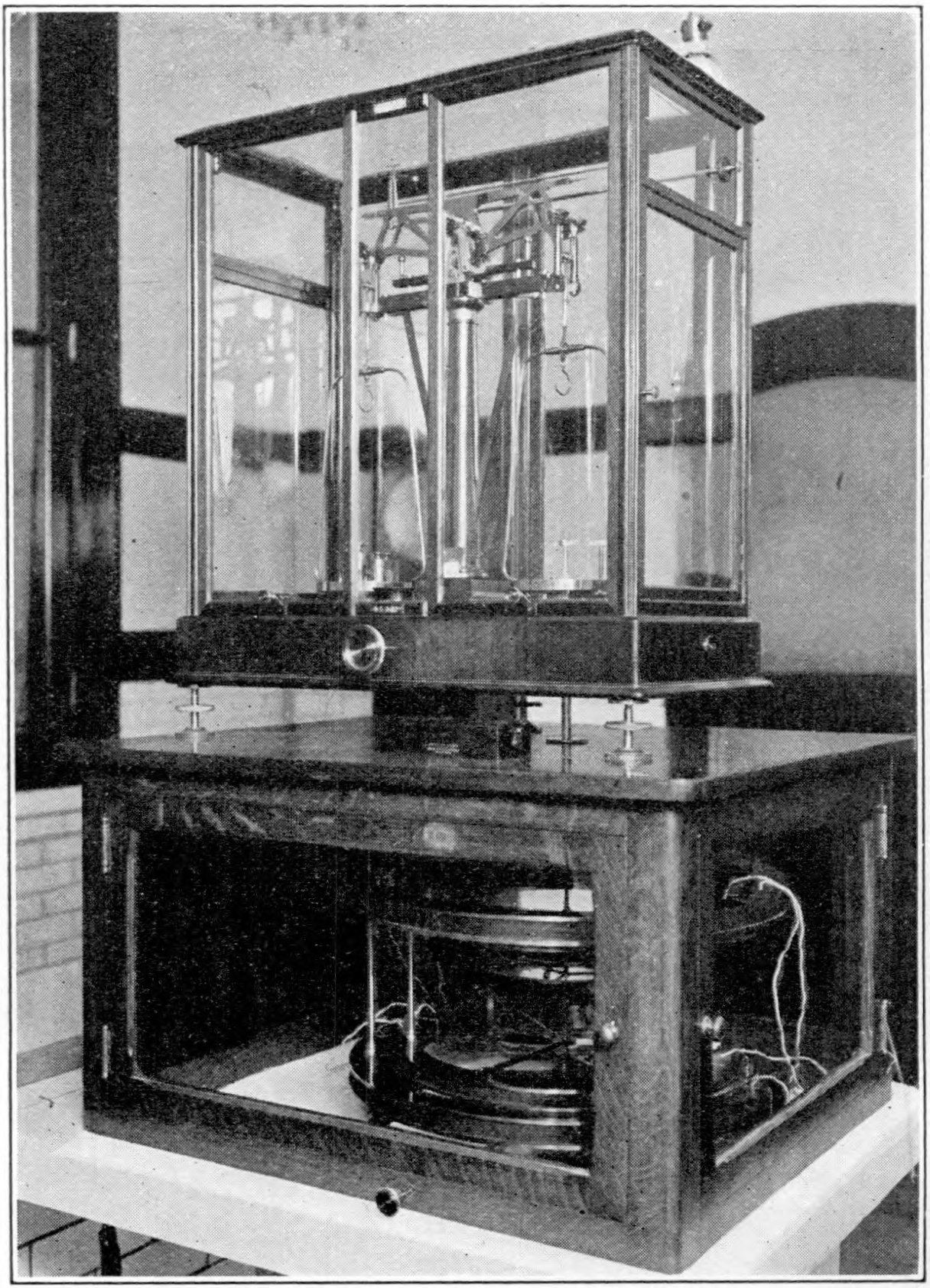
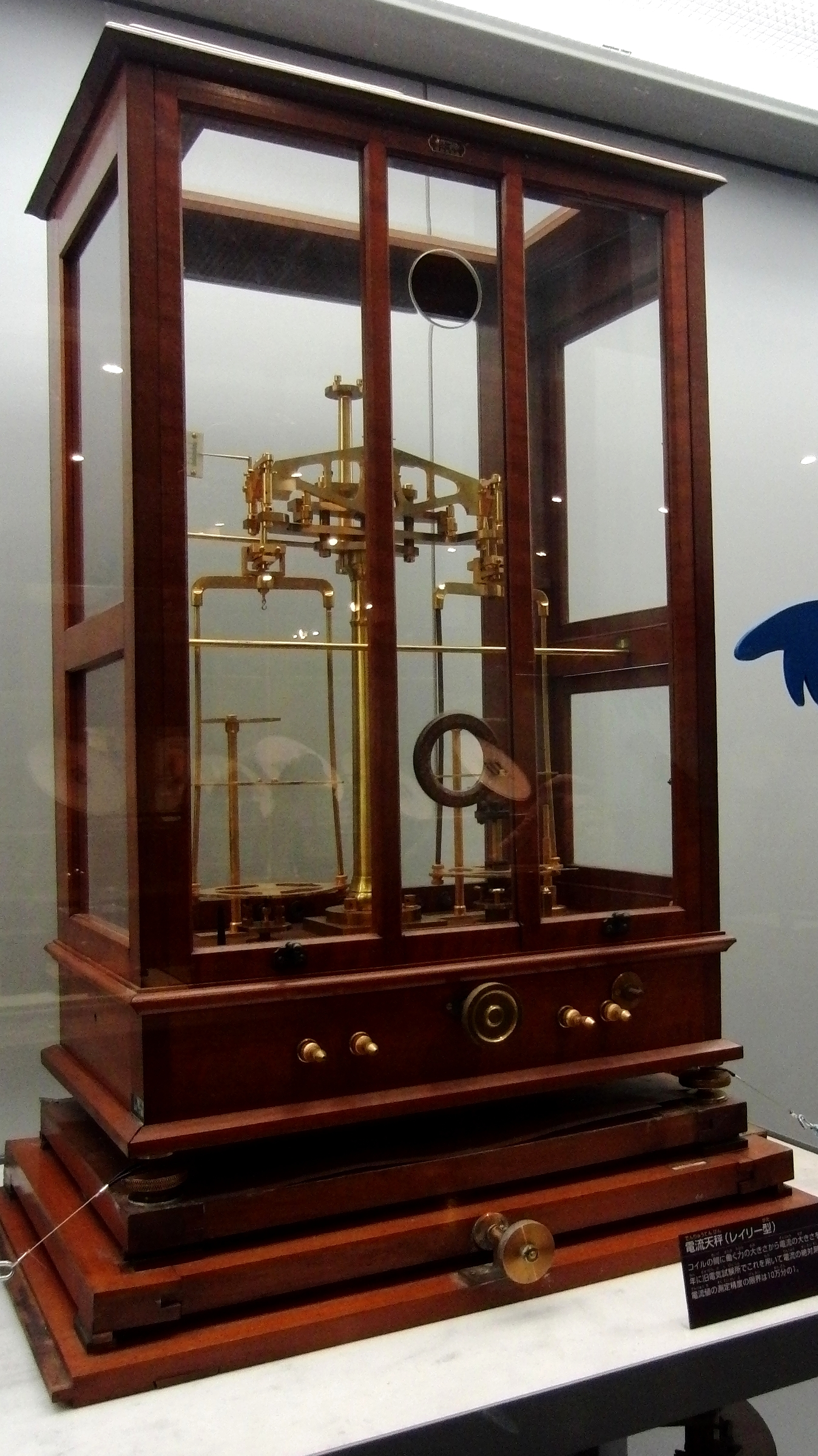
(left) Rosa-Dorsey type Ampere balance at the US National Bureau of Standards (now NIST) in 1927. The current coils are visible under the balance, attached to the right balance arm.
(right) Ampere balance constructed at the former National Institute of Advanced Industrial Science and Technology, Japan, now in the National Museum of Nature and Science, Tokyo, Japan.

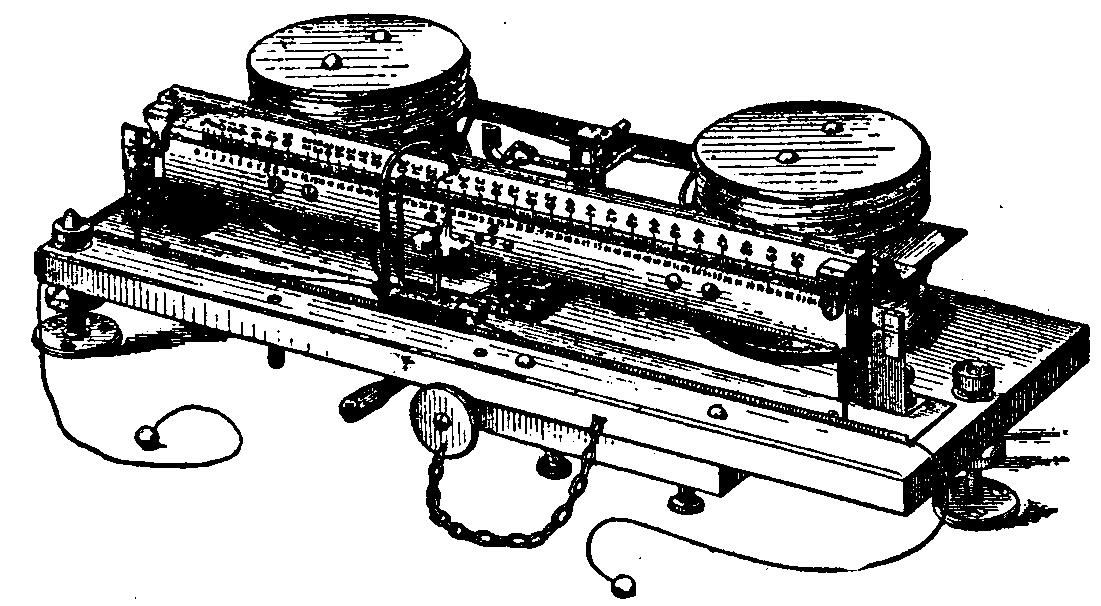
The ampere balance

The ampere balance (also current balance or Kelvin balance) is an electromechanical apparatus used for the precise measurement of the SI unit of electric current, the ampere. It was invented by William Thomson, 1st Baron Kelvin.

The current to be measured is passed in series through two coils of wire, one of which is attached to one arm of a sensitive balance. The magnetic force between the two coils is measured by the amount of weight needed on the other arm of the balance to keep it in equilibrium. This is used to calculate the numerical value of the current.

The main weakness of the ampere balance is that the calculation of the current involves the dimensions of the coils. So the accuracy of the current measurement is limited by the accuracy with which the coils can be measured, and their mechanical rigidity.

A more complicated version of an ampere balance, that removes this source of inaccuracy by a calibration step, is the Kibble balance, invented by Bryan Kibble in 1975. This experimental device was developed at government metrology laboratories worldwide with the goal of providing a more accurate definition of the kilogram, the world's standard of mass. In this application, the Kibble balance functions in the reverse sense to the Ampere balance: it was used to weigh the International Prototype of the Kilogram, defining the kilogram in terms of an electric current and a voltage. In 2019, the kilogram, ampere, kelvin, and mole were redefined in terms of fundamental constants, removing the dependence on physical objects.

== Usage ==
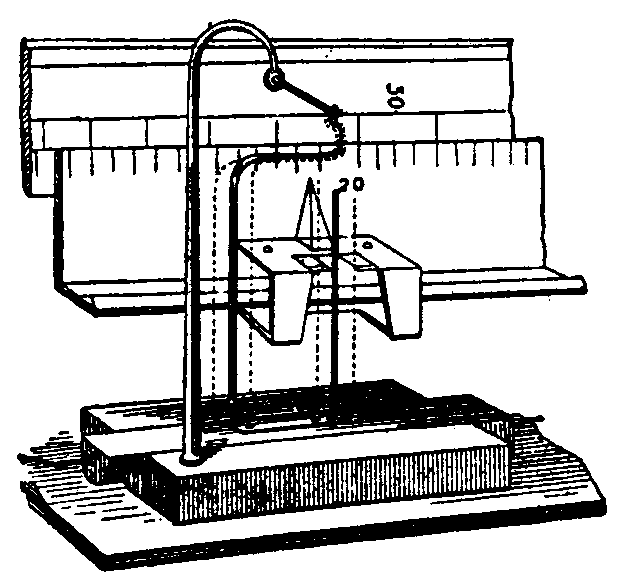
Slider of Kelvin's ampere balance

Approximate readings may be obtained by reading the position of the weight on the scale, or a more accurate reading may be obtained as follows: The upper edge of the shelf on which the weights slide is graduated into equal divisions, and the weight is provided with a sharp tongue of metal in order that its position on the shelf may be accurately determined. Since the current passing through the balance when equilibrium is obtained with a given weight is proportional to the square root of the couple due to this weight, it follows that the current strength when equilibrium is obtained is proportional to the product of the square root of the weight used and the displacement of this weight from its zero position. Each instrument is accompanied by a pair of weights and by a square root table, so that the product of the square roots of the number corresponding to the position of the sliding weight and the ascertained constant for each weight, gives at once the value of the current in amperes. Each of these balances is made to cover a certain range of reading. Thus, the centiampere balance ranges from 1 to 100 centiamperes, the deciampere balance from 1 to 100 deciamperes, the ampere balance from 1 to 100 amperes, etc.
