= Francis Everitt =

British physicist

C. W. Francis Everitt
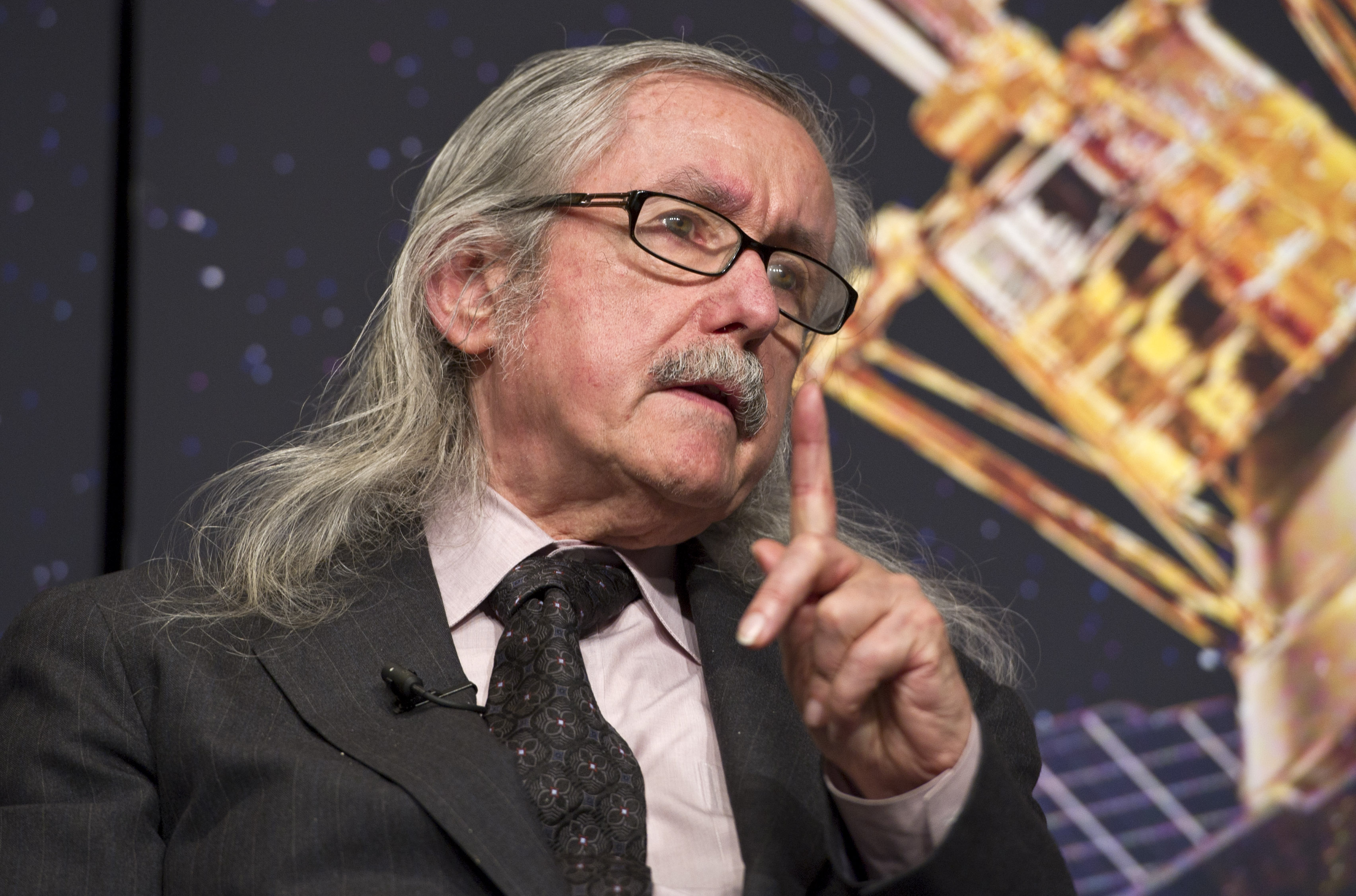
- Francis Everitt at a NASA press conference
- Born: 8 March 1934 (age 92)
- Education: Imperial College London
- Known for: Gravity Probe B, relativity
- Awards: Guggenheim Fellowship, History of Science and Technology 1976 NASA Distinguished Public Service Medal 2005
- Scientific career
- Fields: Physics
- Thesis: Studies in the magnetism of baked and igneous rocks (1959)
- Doctoral advisor: John Atherton Clegg

Charles William Francis Everitt (born 8 March 1934) is a US-based English physicist working on experimental testing of general relativity.

Everitt was educated at Imperial College London and the University of Pennsylvania in low-temperature physics. He is Professor at the Hansen Experimental Physics Laboratory of Stanford University and is also an Associate Member of the Kavli Institute for Particle Astrophysics and Cosmology (KIPAC).

Everitt is Principal Investigator of the Gravity Probe B mission mainly aimed to test frame-dragging at an expected accuracy of 1%. According to general relativity, it is an effect induced by the rotation of the Earth on orbiting gyroscopes. Everitt spent more than 40 years on the project and was awarded with the NASA Distinguished Public Service Medal. The results were published in Physical Review Letters in May 2011. The results confirm general relativity's predictions, though not to the project's ambitious goal of 1% precision.

In 1985, along with Remo Ruffini, Riccardo Giacconi, Abdus Salam, Paul Boynton, George Coyne, and Fang Li-Zhi, Professor Everitt co-founded the International Center for Relativistic Astrophysics. Everitt is the current Chairman of the ICRANet Steering Committee for the ICRANet Center at Stanford University.

== Bibliometric information ==
As of November 2013, according to the NASA ADS database, the h-index of C.W.F. Everitt is 18, with a total number of citations (self-citations excluded) of about 900. The tori index and the riq index are 12.1 and 62, respectively.
