= Gravity Probe B =

Orbital gravitational observatory

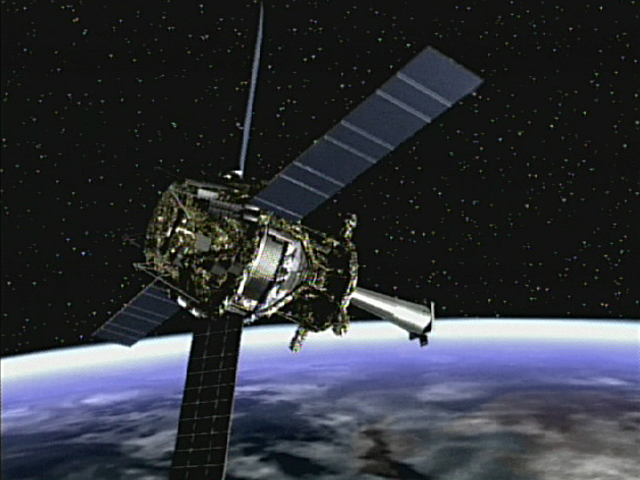
- Mission type: Astrophysics
- Operator: NASA/Stanford University
- COSPAR ID: 2004-014A
- SATCAT no.: 28230
- Website: einstein.stanford.edu
- Mission duration: 6 years, 7 months and 17 days

Spacecraft properties
- Manufacturer: Lockheed Martin
- Launch mass: 3,100 kg (6,800 lb)
- Dimensions: 6.4 m × 2.6 m (21.0 ft × 8.5 ft)
- Power: 606 W Spacecraft: 293 W Payload: 313 W

Start of mission
- Launch date: 20 April 2004, 16:57:24 UTC
- Rocket: Delta II 7920-10C
- Launch site: Vandenberg SLC-2W

End of mission
- Disposal: Decommissioned
- Deactivated: 8 December 2010

Orbital parameters
- Reference system: Geocentric
- Regime: Low Earth
- Semi-major axis: 7,027.4 km (4,366.6 mi)
- Eccentricity: 0.0014
- Perigee altitude: 641 km (398 mi)
- Apogee altitude: 645 km (401 mi)
- Inclination: 90.007º
- Period: 97.65 minutes
- Epoch: 2004-04-20 15:57:00 UTC
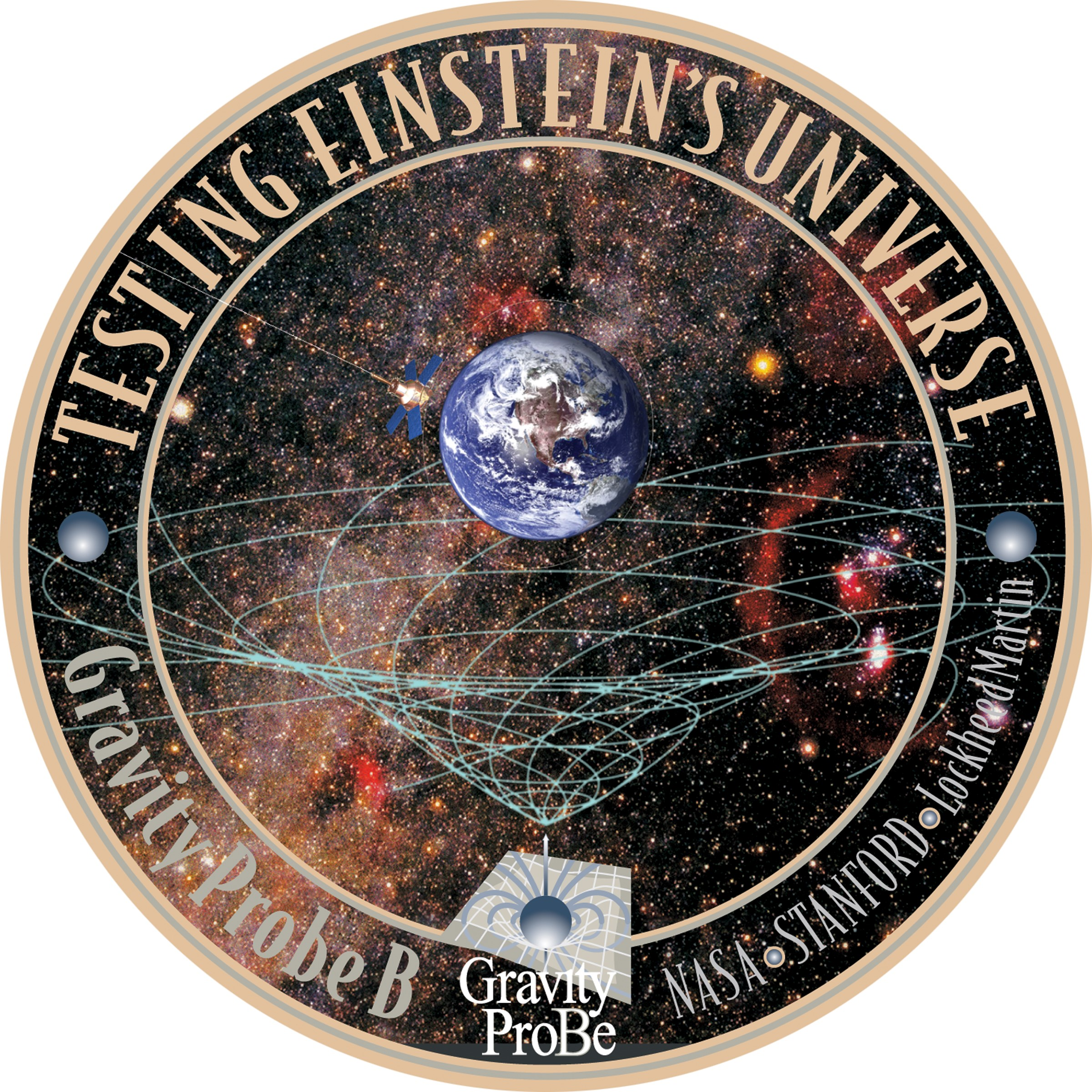

Gravity Probe B (GP-B) was a satellite-based experiment whose objective was to test two previously-unverified predictions of general relativity: the geodetic effect and frame-dragging. This was to be accomplished by measuring, very precisely, tiny changes in the direction of spin of four gyroscopes contained in an Earth-orbiting satellite at 650 km (400 mi) of altitude, crossing directly over the poles.

The satellite was launched on 20 April 2004 on a Delta II rocket. The spaceflight phase lasted until 2005; Its aim was to measure spacetime curvature near Earth, and thereby the stress–energy tensor (which is related to the distribution and the motion of matter in space) in and near Earth. This provided a test of general relativity, gravitomagnetism and related models. The principal investigator was Francis Everitt.

Initial results confirmed the expected geodetic effect to an accuracy of about 1%. The expected frame-dragging effect was similar in magnitude to the current noise level (the noise being dominated by initially unmodeled effects due to nonuniform coatings on the gyroscopes). Work continued to model and account for these sources of error, thus permitting extraction of the frame-dragging signal. By August 2008, the frame-dragging effect had been confirmed to within 15% of the expected result, and the December 2008 NASA report indicated that the geodetic effect was confirmed to be better than 0.5%.

In an article published in the journal Physical Review Letters in 2011, the authors reported analysis of the data from all four gyroscopes results in a geodetic drift rate of −6601.8±18.3 mas/yr and a frame-dragging drift rate of −37.2±7.2 mas/yr, in good agreement with the general relativity predictions of −6606.1±0.28% mas/yr and −39.2±0.19% mas/yr, respectively.

== Overview ==
Gravity Probe B was a relativity gyroscope experiment funded by NASA. Efforts were led by the Stanford University physics department with Lockheed Martin as the primary subcontractor. Mission scientists viewed it as the second relativity experiment in space, following the successful launch of Gravity Probe A (GP-A) in 1976.

The mission plans were to test two unverified predictions of general relativity: the geodetic effect and frame-dragging. This was to be accomplished by measuring, very precisely, tiny changes in the direction of spin of four gyroscopes contained in an Earth satellite orbiting at 650 km (400 mi) altitude, crossing directly over the poles. The gyroscopes were intended to be so free from disturbance that they would provide a near-perfect spacetime reference system. This would allow them to reveal how space and time are "warped" by the presence of the Earth, and by how much the Earth's rotation "drags" space-time around with it.

The geodetic effect is an effect caused by space-time being "curved" by the mass of the Earth. A gyroscope's axis when parallel transported around the Earth in one complete revolution does not end up pointing in exactly the same direction as before. The angle "missing" may be thought of as the amount the gyroscope "leans over" into the slope of the space-time curvature. A more precise explanation for the space curvature part of the geodetic precession is obtained by using a nearly flat cone to model the space curvature of the Earth's gravitational field. Such a cone is made by cutting out a thin "pie-slice" from a circle and gluing the cut edges together. The spatial geodetic precession is a measure of the missing "pie-slice" angle. Gravity Probe B was expected to measure this effect to an accuracy of one part in 10000, the most stringent check on general relativistic predictions to date.

The much smaller frame-dragging effect is an example of gravitomagnetism. It is an analog of magnetism in classical electrodynamics, but caused by rotating masses rather than rotating electric charges. Previously, only two analyses of the laser-ranging data obtained by the two LAGEOS satellites, published in 1997 and 2004, claimed to have found the frame-dragging effect with an accuracy of about 20% and 10% respectively, whereas Gravity Probe B aimed to measure the frame dragging effect to a precision of 1%. A recent analysis of Mars Global Surveyor data has claimed to have confirmed the frame dragging effect to a precision of 0.5%, although the accuracy of this claim is disputed.

The launch was planned for 19 April 2004 at Vandenberg Air Force Base but was scrubbed within 5 minutes of the scheduled launch window due to changing winds in the upper atmosphere. An unusual feature of the mission is that it only had a one-second launch window due to the precise orbit required by the experiment. On 20 April, at 9:57:23 AM PDT (16:57:23 UTC) the spacecraft was launched successfully. The satellite was placed in orbit at 11:12:33 AM (18:12:33 UTC) after a cruise period over the south pole and a short second burn. The mission lasted 16 months.

Some preliminary results were presented at a special session during the American Physical Society meeting in April 2007. NASA initially requested a proposal for extending the GP-B data analysis phase through December 2007. The data analysis phase was further extended to September 2008 using funding from Richard Fairbank, Stanford and NASA, and beyond that point using non-NASA funding only. Final science results were reported in 2011.

== Experimental setup ==
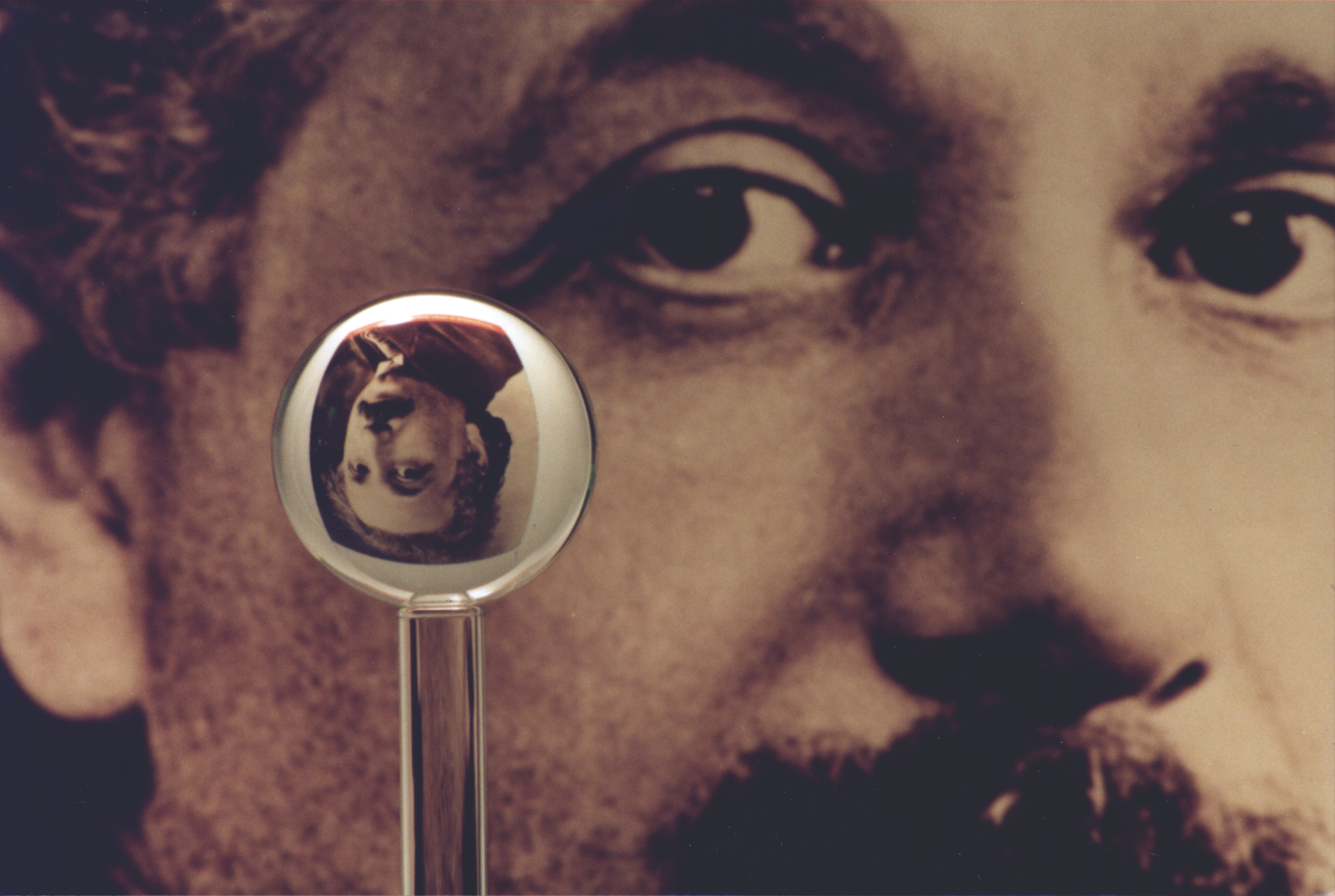
At the time, the fused quartz gyroscopes created for Gravity Probe B were the most nearly perfect spheres ever created by humans. The gyroscopes differ from a perfect sphere by no more than 40 atoms of thickness. One is pictured here refracting the image of Albert Einstein in background.

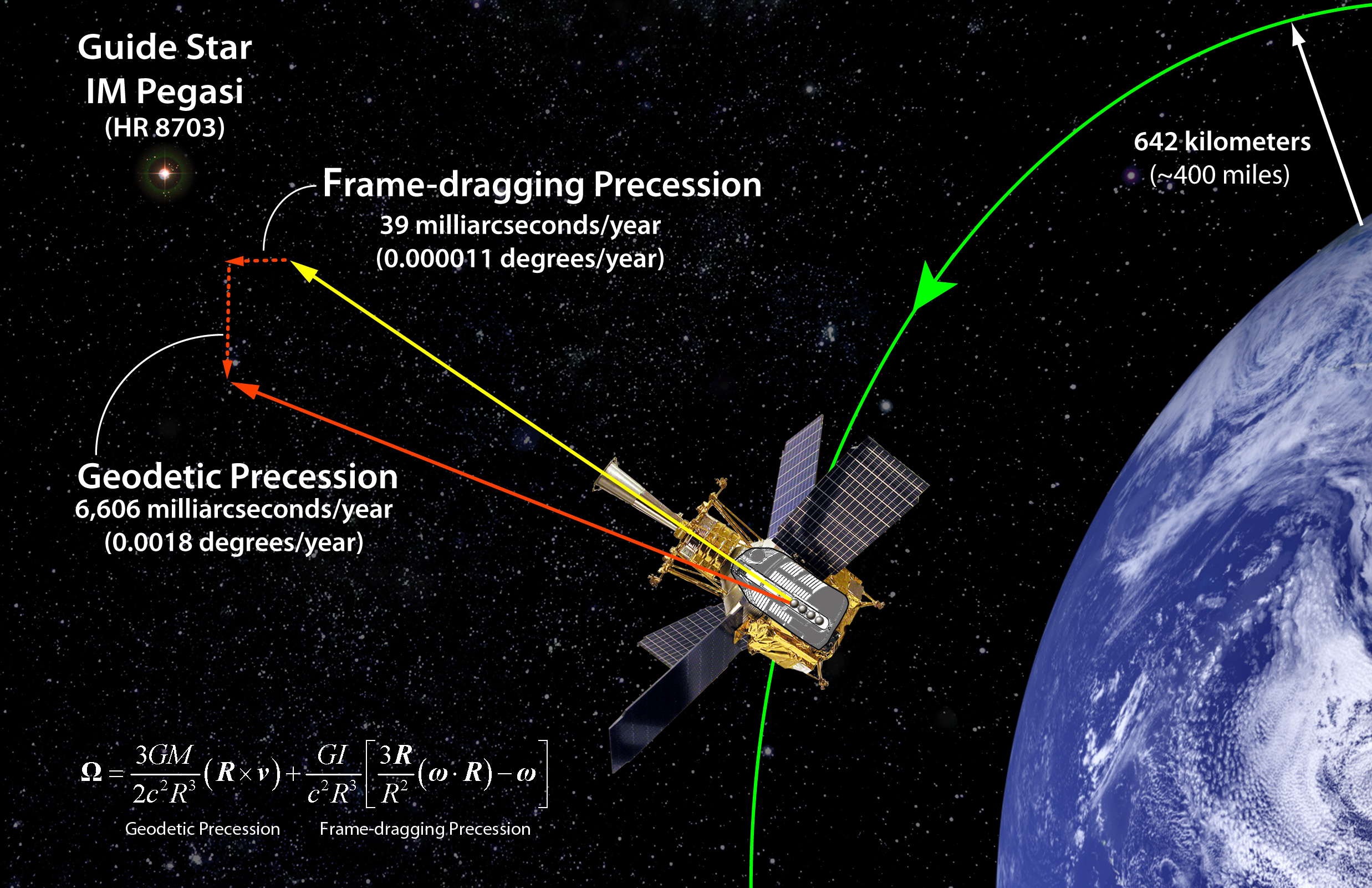

The Gravity Probe B experiment comprised four London moment gyroscopes and a reference telescope sighted on IM Pegasi, a binary star in the constellation Pegasus. In polar orbit, with the gyro spin directions also pointing toward IM Pegasi, the frame-dragging and geodetic effects came out at right angles, each gyroscope measuring both.

The gyroscopes were housed in a dewar of superfluid helium, maintaining a temperature of under 2 kelvins (−271 °C; −456 °F). Near-absolute zero temperatures were required to minimize molecular interference, and enable the lead and niobium components of the gyroscope mechanisms to become superconductive.

At the time of their manufacture, the gyroscopes were the most nearly spherical objects ever made (two gyroscopes still hold that record, but third place has been taken by the silicon spheres made by the Avogadro project). Approximately the size of ping pong balls, they were perfectly round to within forty atoms (less than 10 nm). If one of these spheres were scaled to the size of the Earth, the tallest mountains and deepest ocean trench would measure only 2.4 m (8 ft) high. The spheres were made of fused quartz and coated with an extremely thin layer of niobium. A primary concern was minimizing any influence on their spin, so the gyroscopes could never touch their containing compartment. They were held suspended with electric fields, spun up using a flow of helium gas, and their spin axes were sensed by monitoring the magnetic field of the superconductive niobium layer with SQUIDs. (A spinning superconductor generates a magnetic field precisely aligned with the rotation axis; see London moment.)

IM Pegasi was chosen as the guide star for multiple reasons. First, it needed to be bright enough to be usable for sightings. Then it was close to the ideal positions near the celestial equator. Also important was its well-understood motion in the sky, which was helped by the fact that this star emits relatively strong radio signals. In preparation for the setup of this mission, astronomers analyzed the radio-based position measurements with respect to far distant quasars taken over several years to understand its motion as precisely as needed.

== History ==
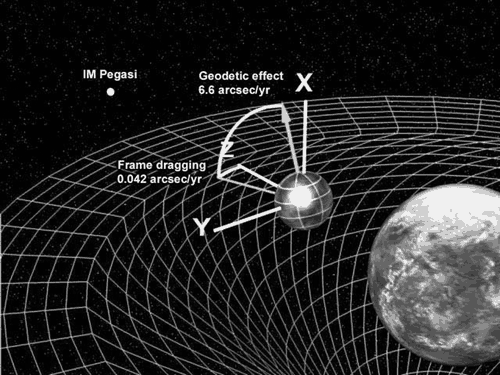
A representation of the geodetic effect.

The conceptual design for this mission was first proposed by an MIT professor, George Pugh, who was working with the U.S. Department of Defense in 1959 and later discussed by Leonard Schiff (Stanford) in 1960 at Pugh's suggestion, based partly on a theoretical paper about detecting frame dragging that Schiff had written in 1957. It was proposed to NASA in 1961, and they supported the project with funds in 1964. This grant ended in 1977 after a long phase of engineering research into the basic requirements and tools for the satellite.

In 1986 NASA changed plans for the Space Shuttle, which forced the mission team to switch from a shuttle-based launch design to one that was based on the Delta 2, and in 1995 tests planned of a prototype on a shuttle flight were cancelled as well.

Gravity Probe B marks the first time that Stanford University has been in control of the development and operations of a space satellite funded by NASA.

The total cost of the project was about $750 million.

== Mission timeline ==
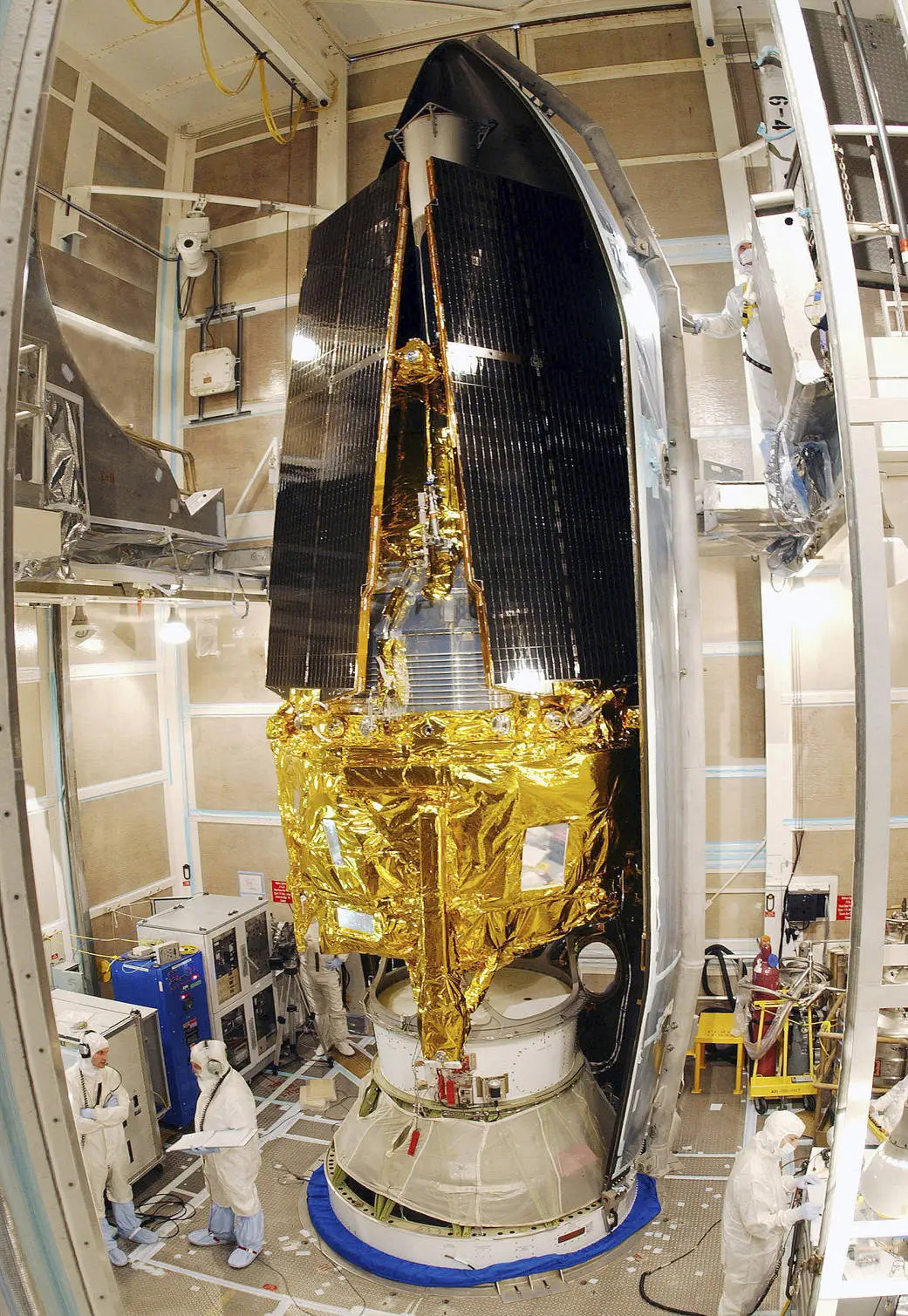
Gravity Probe B before launch

This is a list of major events for the GP-B experiment.

20 April 2004
Launch of GP-B from Vandenberg AFB and successful insertion into polar orbit.

27 August 2004
GP-B entered its science phase. On mission day 129 all systems were configured to be ready for data collection, with the only exception being gyro 4, which needed further spin axis alignment.

15 August 2005
The science phase of the mission ended and the spacecraft instruments transitioned to the final calibration mode.

26 September 2005
The calibration phase ended with liquid helium still in the dewar. The spacecraft was returned to science mode pending the depletion of liquid helium.

February 2006
Phase I of data analysis complete

September 2006
Analysis team realised that more error analysis was necessary (particularly around the polhode motion of the gyros) than could be done in the time to April 2007 and applied to NASA for an extension of funding to the end of 2007.

December 2006
Completion of Phase III of data analysis

14 April 2007
Announcement of best results obtained to date. Francis Everitt gave a plenary talk at the meeting of the American Physical Society announcing initial results: "The data from the GP-B gyroscopes clearly confirm Einstein's predicted geodetic effect to a precision of better than 1 percent. However, the frame-dragging effect is 170 times smaller than the geodetic effect, and Stanford scientists are still extracting its signature from the spacecraft data."

8 December 2010
GP-B spacecraft decommissioned, left in its 642 km (399 mi) polar orbit.

4 May 2011
GP-B Final experimental results were announced. In a public press and media event at NASA Headquarters, GP-B Principal Investigator, Francis Everitt presented the final results of Gravity Probe B.

19 November 2015
Publication of GP-B Special Volume (Volume 32, Issue 22) in the peer-reviewed journal, Classical and Quantum Gravity.

On 9 February 2007, it was announced that a number of unexpected signals had been received and that these would need to be separated out before final results could be released. In April it was announced that the spin axes of the gyroscopes were affected by torque, in a manner that varied over time, requiring further analysis to allow the results to be corrected for this source of error. Consequently, the date for the final release of data was pushed back several times. In the data for the frame-dragging results presented at the April 2007 meeting of the American Physical Society, the random errors were much larger than the theoretical expected value and scattered on both the positive and negative sides of a null result, therefore causing skepticism as to whether any useful data could be extracted in the future to test this effect.

In June 2007, a detailed update was released explaining the cause of the problem, and the solution that was being worked on. Although electrostatic patches caused by non-uniform coating of the spheres were anticipated, and were thought to have been controlled for before the experiment, it was subsequently found that the final layer of the coating on the spheres defined two-halves of slightly different contact potential, which gave the sphere an electrostatic axis. This created a classical dipole torque on each rotor, of a magnitude similar to the expected frame dragging effect. In addition, it dissipated energy from the polhode motion by inducing currents in the housing electrodes, causing the motion to change with time. This meant that a simple time-average polhode model was insufficient, and a detailed orbit by orbit model was needed to remove the effect. As it was anticipated that "anything could go wrong", the final part of the flight mission was calibration, where amongst other activities, data was gathered with the spacecraft axis deliberately misaligned for 24 hours, to exacerbate any potential problems. This data proved invaluable for identifying the effects. With the electrostatic torque modeled as a function of axis misalignment, and the polhode motion modeled at a sufficiently fine level, it was hoped to isolate the relativity torques to the originally expected resolution.

Stanford agreed to release the raw data to the public at an unspecified date in the future. It is likely that this data will be examined by independent scientists and independently reported to the public well after the final release by the project scientists. Because future interpretations of the data by scientists outside GP-B may differ from the official results, it may take several more years for all of the data received by GP-B to be completely understood.

=== NASA review ===
A review by a panel of 15 experts commissioned by NASA recommended against extending the data analysis phase beyond 2008. They warned that the required reduction in noise level (due to classical torques and breaks in data collection due to solar flares) "is so large that any effect ultimately detected by this experiment will have to overcome considerable (and in our opinion, well justified) skepticism in the scientific community".

=== Data analysis after NASA ===
NASA funding and sponsorship of the program ended on 30 September 2008, but GP-B secured alternative funding from King Abdulaziz City for Science and Technology in Saudi Arabia that enabled the science team to continue working at least through December 2009. On 29 August 2008, the 18th meeting of the external GP-B Science Advisory Committee was held at Stanford to report progress.

The Stanford-based analysis group and NASA announced on 4 May 2011 that the data from GP-B indeed confirms the two predictions of Albert Einstein's general theory of relativity. The findings were published in the journal Physical Review Letters. The prospects for further experimental measurement of frame-dragging after GP-B were commented on in the journal Europhysics Letters.

== See also ==
- Frame-dragging
- Gravity Probe A
- Gravitomagnetism
- Modified Newtonian dynamics
- Tests of general relativity
- Timeline of gravitational physics and relativity
