= International Association of Geodesy =

Constituent scientific organization

- Predecessor: European Arc Measurement (German: Europäische Gradmessung)
- Formation: 1886; 140 years ago
- Type: Scholarly society
- Purpose: advancement of geodesy
- Headquarters: Federal Agency for Cartography and Geodesy (BKG), Germany
- Region served: worldwide
- Parent organization: International Union of Geodesy and Geophysics
- Website: geodesy.science/iag/
- Formerly called: International Geodetic Association

The International Association of Geodesy (IAG) is a constituent association of the International Union of Geodesy and Geophysics focusing on the science which measures and describes the Earth's shape, its rotation and gravity field.

The precursors to the IAG were arc measurement campaigns. The IAG was founded in 1862 as the Mitteleuropäische Gradmessung (Central European Arc Measurement), later became the Europäische Gradmessung (European Arc Measurement) in 1867, the Internationale Erdmessung (Association Geodésique Internationale in French and "International Geodetic Association" in English) in 1886, and took its present name in 1946.

== History ==
=== Central European Arc Measurement ===
In 1861, Johann Jacob Baeyer planned an arc measurement in Central Europe aiming at determining the figure of the Earth. It implied a triangulation network reaching from Oslo to Palermo and from Brussels to Warsaw and included European astronomic observatories. Baeyer specified that the new network should be calculated using the rigorous method of least-squares adjustment. The same year, he proposed the creation of the Central European Arc Measurement, whose objective was to redetermine anomalies in the shape of the Earth using precise arc measurements combined with gravimetry. The aim was to figure out the geoid using gravimetric and leveling measurements to derive an accurate understanding of the Earth ellipsoid while taking vertical deflections into account.

Baeyer's goal was a new determination of anomalies in the shape of the Earth using precise triangulations, combined with gravity measurements. This involved determining the geoid by means of gravimetric and leveling measurements, in order to deduce the exact knowledge of the Earth spheroid while taking into account local deflections of the plumb line due to gravity anomalies affecting gravity of Earth. To resolve this problem, it was necessary to carefully study considerable areas of land in all directions. Baeyer developed a plan to coordinate geodetic surveys in the space between the parallels of Palermo and Christiana (Oslo) and the meridians of Bonn and Trunz (German name for Milejewo in Poland). This territory was covered by a triangle network and included more than thirty observatories or stations whose position was determined astronomically. Bayer proposed to remeasure ten arcs of meridians and a larger number of arcs of parallels, to compare the curvature of the meridian arcs on the two slopes of the Alps, in order to determine the influence of this mountain range on vertical deflection. Baeyer also planned to determine the curvature of the seas, the Mediterranean Sea and Adriatic Sea in the south, the North Sea and the Baltic Sea in the north. In his mind, the cooperation of all the States of Central Europe could open the field to scientific research of the highest interest, research that each State, taken in isolation, was not able to undertake.

On July 7, 1861, the Prussian delegation in Bern submitted Baeyer's project to the Federal Council. The Federal Department of the Interior submitted it to Guillaume Henri Dufour, head of the Swiss Federal Office of Topography. At the 1861 session of the Swiss Society of Natural Sciences in Lausanne, the project discussed by the physics section of the Society was strongly supported by Élie Ritter and Adolphe Hirsch. On their proposal, the Society decided to give a favorable opinion on Switzerland's accession to the Central European Arc Measurement and to establish the Swiss Geodetic Commission.

When Spain decided the creation of a large-scale map of Spain in 1852, Carlos Ibáñez e Ibáñez de Ibero recognized that the end standards with which the most perfect devices of the eighteenth century and those of the first half of the nineteenth century were still equipped, that Jean-Charles de Borda or Friedrich Wilhelm Bessel simply joined measuring the intervals by means of vernier callipers or glass wedges, would be replaced advantageously for accuracy by microscopic measurements, a system designed in Switzerland by Ferdinand Rudolph Hassler and Johann Georg Tralles, and which Ibáñez ameliorated using a single standard with lines marked on the bar.

In continental Europe, surveyors continued to use measuring instruments calibrated on the Toise of Peru. Ibáñez and Frutos Saavedra Meneses went to Paris to supervise the production by Jean Brunner of a four metres long measuring instrument which they had devised. In 1856, the length of the rulers was determined by comparison with Borda's double-toise N°1 which was the main reference for measuring all geodetic baselines in France and whose length was by definition 3.8980732 metres at a specified temperature. The European Arc Measurement decided the creation of an international geodetic standard at the General Conference held in Paris in 1875. Thus, the Commission resolved to acquire, at common expense, a measuring instrument which was to be used either to measure new bases in countries which did not have their own device or to repeat previous measurements. The comparisons of the new results with those provided by the old national standards would make it possible to obtain their equation. The apparatus would to be calibrated at the International Bureau of Weights and Measures (BIPM), using the international prototype metre. The system with a microscope and bimetallic rulers, which had given such brilliant results in Spain, was proposed.

From 1865 to 1868, Carlos Ibáñez e Ibáñez de Ibero added the survey of the Balearic Islands with that of the Iberian Peninsula. For this work, he devised a new instrument. This device, called the Ibáñez apparatus, was calibrated on the Spanish standard and would be used in Switzerland to measure the geodetic bases of Aarberg, Weinfelden and Bellinzona. In June 1886, following these operations, the Ibáñez apparatus was recalibrated on Brunner's international bimetallic device (itself calibrated on the international prototype metre) at the International Bureau of Weights and Measures (BIPM).

In 1875, Charles Sanders Peirce conducted experiments at the Geneva Observatory with his reversible pendulum, and commissioned the Société genevoise d'instruments physiques (SIP) a vacuum chamber for his pendulum. The building of the former observatory was demolished in 1829 and rebuilt on the same site between Geneva and the municipality of Plainpalais the following year by Guillaume Henri Dufour. Significant improvements in gravity measuring instruments must also be attributed to Friedrich Wilhelm Bessel. He devised a gravimeter constructed by Adolf Repsold which was first used in Switzerland by Emile Plantamour, Charles Sanders Peirce and Isaac-Charles Élisée Cellérier (1818–1889), a Genevan mathematician soon independently discovered a mathematical formula to correct systematic errors of this device which had been noticed by Plantamour and Adolphe Hirsch. In 1875, the Conference of the European Arc Measurement also dealt with the best instrument to be used for the determination of gravitational acceleration. After an in-depth discussion in which Charles Sanders Peirce took part, the association decided in favor of the reversion pendulum, which was used in Switzerland, and it was resolved to redo in Berlin, in the station where Friedrich Wilhelm Bessel made his famous measurements, the determination of gravity by means of devices of various kinds employed in different countries, to compare them and thus to have the equation of their scales.

This work led in 1901 to the Earth ellipsoid proposed by Friedrich Robert Helmert, whose parameter values were remarkably close to reality. Helmert determined a value of 1/298.3 for the flattening of the Earth to be compared with that of 1/298.25 obtained from the analysis of the first satellites measurements.

=== First president ===
At the first meeting of the International Geodetic Association in 1886 in Berlin, Carlos Ibáñez e Ibáñez de Ibero was unanimously elected President. Ibáñez had major contributions to multiple aspects of geodesy spanning technical work on instrumentation, many influential publications, and international diplomacy in the space of measurement standards. He presided over the International Committee for Weights and Measures after the Convention of the Metre that led to the international standard metre length. Just prior to becoming president of the International Geodetic Association he was recognized by the French Legion of Honour for his international work in promoting the metric system. Ibáñez served for seventeen years, developing the organization's by-laws and growing list of member nations. In 1883, as president of the Permanent Commission of the European Arc Measurement since 1874, he advocated for the international adoption of the Greenwich meridian.

== Overview ==
The IAG consists of the IAG Office, IAG Bureau, IAG Council, IAG Executive Committee, commissions, services and an Observing System. The organization is hosted by the Federal Agency for Cartography and Geodesy (BKG) with their website hosted by the Federal Office of Metrology and Surveying.

There are four commissions:

- Reference Frames
- Gravity Field
- Geodynamics and Earth Rotation
- Positioning & Applications

and Inter-commission Committees on Theory, Marine Geodesy, and Geodesy for Climate Research.

== International Services ==
The twelve IAG Services are split into three general topic areas: geodesy (IERS, IDS, IGS, ILRS, and IVS), gravity (IGFS, ICGEM, IDEMS, ISG, IGETS and BGI) and sea level (PSMSL).

- International Gravimetric Bureau (French: Bureau Gravimétrique International) (BGI)
- International Center for Global Earth Models (ICGEM)
- International Digital Elevation Model Service (IDEMS)
- International DORIS Service (IDS)
- International Earth Rotation and Reference Systems Service (IERS)
- International Geodynamics and Earth Tide Service (IGETS)
- International Gravity Field Service (IGFS)
- International GNSS Service (IGS)
- International Laser Ranging Service (ILRS)
- International VLBI Service for Geodesy and Astrometry (IVS)
- International Service for the Geoid (ISG)
- Permanent Service for Mean Sea Level (PSMSL)

The Global Geodetic Observing System (GGOS) is the observing arm of the IAG that focuses on proving the geodetic infrastructure to measure changes in the earth's shape, rotation and mass distribution.

The International GNSS Service (IGS), part of GGOS, archives and processes GNSS data from around the world. IGS data is used in the 2021 reference frame (G2139) of WGS84.

== Journal ==
IAG sponsors the Journal of Geodesy, published by Springer.

== Awards ==
The IAG's awards for outstanding achievement in geodesy include the Guy Bomford Prize (inaugurated in 1975), the Levallois Medal (inaugurated in 1979), and the IAG Young Author's Award (inaugurated in 1993).

== See also ==
- Arc measurement of Delambre and Méchain
- Carlos Ibáñez e Ibáñez de Ibero – president of the International Geodetic Association and 1st president of the International Committee for Weights and Measures
- Johann Jacob Baeyer – founder of the Mitteleuropaïsche Gradmessung
- History of geodesy
- History of the metre
- International Bureau of Weights and Measures
- International Geodetic Student Organisation
- Metre Convention
- Seconds pendulum

== Sources ==
- Hirsch, A.; von Oppolzer, Th., eds. (1884). "Rapport de la Commission chargée d'examiner les propositions du bureau de l'Association sur l'unification des longitudes et des heures" [Report of the Commission charged with examining the proposals of the Bureau of the Association on the unification of longitudes and times.]. Comptes-rendus des seances de la Septiéme Conférence Géodésique Internationale pour la mesure des degrés en Europe. Reunie a Rome du 15 au 24 Octobre 1863 [Proceedings of the Seventh International Geodesic Conference for the measurement of degrees in Europe. Held in Rome from 15 to 24 October 1863] (in French). Berlin: G. Reimer.
