= Central European Arc Measurement =

The Central European Arc Measurement (German: Mitteleuropäische Gradmessung) was established in Berlin in October 1864 following the creation of the Swiss Geodetic Commission in 1861 and a preliminary consultation between representatives of Prussia, Austria, and Saxony in April 1862. It became the European Arc Measurement (German: Europäische Gradmessung) in 1867 and the International Geodetic Association (German: Internationale Erdmessung) in 1886. In Brussels at the Inaugural General Assembly of the International Science Council (then the International Research Council), the International Union of Geodesy and Geophysics (IUGG) was established on 28 July 1919 to promote activities of already-existing international scientific societies among them the International Geodetic Association. (Note: The International Geodetic Association was one of the earliest international scientific associations only preceded by the Magnetischer Verein (Magnetic Association), created in 1836 by Carl Friedrich Gauss, Alexander von Humboldt and Wilhelm Eduard Weber.) At the first General Assembly of the International Union of Geodesy and Geophysics in Rome in 1922, it became one of its five constituent parts: the Geodesy Section. In August 1930 in Stockholm, the name was changed for Association of Geodesy. It officially adopted its current name, the International Association of Geodesy (IAG), in 1946.

The Swiss Geodetic Commssion aimed at contributing to determine anomalies in the Earth's shape by means of remeasuring Swiss geodetic network, combined with gravimetry (using Repsold-Bessel pendulum) and levelling, in order to gain an accurate understanding of the Earth's ellipsoid and to define the geoid, while accounting for vertical deflections.

Astronomic observations were carried out at observatories around Switzerland for positionning the geodetic network. In order to determine the longitudes, time was transmitted via telegraph lines. For instance, Emile Plantamour fourth director of the Observatory of Geneva collaborated with Adolphe Hirsch for determining the difference of longitude between Neuchâtel Observatory and the former Geneva Observatory then located between Geneva and the former municipality of Plainpalais. From 1862, Plantamour was a member of the Swiss Geodetic Commission. He took charge of five astronomical stations for which, as part of the Central European Arc Measurement project, it was necessary to determine the geographic latitude and the difference in longitude relative to the Federal Observatory in Zurich, and various surrounding connecting stations. He also used telegraphic methods to determine the longitude differences between Geneva and Strasbourg, Munich, Lyon, and Vienna.

Between 1864 and 1891, the Swiss Geodetic Commission carried out a measurement of leveled heights throughout Switzerland, published as the Nivellement de Precision. In 1891, Adolphe Hirsch deduced from all the junctions with foreign countries the altitude of 373.54 metres above the Sea as the reference point for the Swiss national heights network. In 1902, the elevation of the Pierres du Niton was redefined as 373.6 m above sea level. Jakob Hilfiker established its altitude with the mean sea level of Marseille as starting point.

Furthermore, Plantamour employed a reversible pendulum to investigate the acceleration due to gravity in Geneva and other locations. The measurements conducted using the Repsold-Bessel pendulum provided the absolute gravity intensity for each station. However, this instrument was delicate and difficult to transport. Consequently, it was not well-suited for determining gravity intensity at a large number of stations. Robert von Sterneck was the inventor of relative gravity measurement and the designer of the half-second (Sterneck) pendulum. This work informed the Earth ellipsoid proposed by Friedrich Robert Helmert in 1901. A model whose parameter values were remarkably close to reality.

The convention of the International Geodetic Association expired at the end of 1916. It was not renewed due to the First World War. However, Denmark, the Netherlands, Norway, Spain, Sweden, Switzerland, and the United States agreed to maintain a limited geodetic association among neutral states, presided over by Raoul Gautier, director of the Geneva Observatory.

The war also put an end to other initiatives aimed at promoting international scientific collaboration, which had begun with the creation of the International Association of Academies in Wiesbaden on October 9, 1899.

During World War I, many scientists took an interest in how international scientific work might be resumed once hostilities had ended. One idea, primarily American and British in origin, was to bring together the scientific unions representing various disciplines under the authority of a supreme council. An international conference, held in Brussels in July 1919 and attended by scientists from the Allied and Associated Powers (those that had fought against Germany) as well as from a number of neutral states, established an International Research Council and various affiliated unions. Geodesy, however, rather than remaining free and independent as it had been before, was incorporated into the geophysical sciences within the International Union of Geodesy and Geophysics.

Raoul Gautier was appointed in 1922 as vice-president of the Section of Geodesy of the International Union of Geodesy and Geophysics and ensured the continuity of operations carried out by the Association Géodesique réduite entre États neutres (Limited Geodetic Association between Neutral States), notably those of the International Latitudes Service.

From 1922 to 1946, General Georges Perrier served as secretary-general of the Geodesy Section of the International Union of Geodesy and Geophysics, and subsequently of the International Association of Geodesy, whose central bureau was relocated from Potsdam to Paris (1917–1995). William Bowie held the presidency of the Geodesy Section of the International Union of Geodesy and Geophysics (1922–1933), and later served as president of the International Union of Geodesy and Geophysics itself (1933–1936), succeeding Charles Lallemand, the Union’s first president (1919–1933).

== History ==
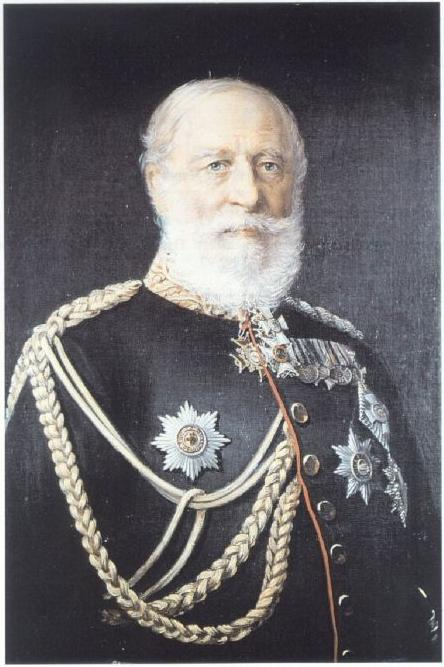
Johann Jacob Baeyer (1794–1885)

In 1861, Johann Jacob Baeyer planned an arc measurement in Central Europe aiming at determining the figure of the Earth. It implied a triangulation network reaching from Oslo to Palermo and from Brussels to Warsaw and included European astronomic observatories. Baeyer specified that the new network should be calculated using the rigorous method of least-squares adjustment.

As early as 1861, Johann Jacob Baeyer sent a memorandum to the King of Prussia recommending international collaboration in Central Europe with the aim of determining the shape and dimensions of the Earth. On July 7, 1861, the Prussian delegation in Bern submitted Baeyer's project to the Federal Council. The Federal Department of the Interior submitted it to Guillaume Henri Dufour, head of the Swiss Federal Office of Topography. At the 1861 session of the Swiss Society of Natural Sciences in Lausanne, the project discussed by the physics section of the Society was strongly supported by Élie Ritter and Adolphe Hirsch. On their proposal, the Society decided to give a favorable opinion on Switzerland's accession to the Central European Arc Measurement and to establish the Swiss Geodetic Commission. Its founding members were Rudolf Wolf, president (canton of Zurich), Guillaume Henri Dufour, honorary president and Élie Ritter (canton of Geneva), Adolphe Hirsch (canton of Neuchâtel) and Hans Heinrich Denzler (canton of Bern). A founding member of the International Committee of the Red Cross and forerunner of metrication in Switzerland, (Note: In 1855, the Dufour map (French: Carte Dufour), the first topographic map of Switzerland for which the metre was adopted as the unit of length, won the gold medal at the Exposition Universelle. On the sidelines of the Exposition Universelle (1855) and the second Congress of Statistics held in Paris, an association with a view to obtaining a uniform decimal system of measures, weights and currencies was created in 1855. A Committee for Weights and Measures and Monies (French: Comité des poids, mesures et monnaies) was created during the Exposition Universelle (1867) in Paris and called for the international adoption of the metric system.) Guillaume Henri Dufour contributed to the creation of the Central European Arc Measurement as a member of the Swiss Geodetic Commission from 1861. Guillaume-Henri Dufour, cantonal engineer in Geneva since 1817 and commissioned by the Federal Diet to superintend land surveying of Switzerland, founded in 1838 in Carouge (canton of Geneva) a topographic office (the future Federal Office of topography), which published under his direction, from 1845 to 1864, the first official map of Switzerland, on the basis of new cantonal measurements. In 1855, the Dufour map (French: Carte Dufour), the first topographic map of Switzerland for which the metre was adopted as the unit of length, won the gold medal at the Exposition Universelle. However, the baselines for this map were measured in 1834 with three toises long measuring rods calibrated on a toise made in 1821 by Jean Nicolas Fortin for Friedrich Georg Wilhelm von Struve.

Baeyer's goal was a new determination of anomalies in the shape of the Earth using precise triangulations, combined with gravity measurements. This involved determining the geoid by means of gravimetric and leveling measurements, in order to deduce the exact knowledge of the terrestrial spheroid while taking into account local variations. To resolve this problem, it was necessary to carefully study considerable areas of land in all directions. Baeyer developed a plan to coordinate geodetic surveys in the space between the parallels of Palermo and Christiana (Oslo) and the meridians of Bonn and Trunz (German name for Milejewo in Poland). This territory was covered by a triangle network and included more than thirty observatories or stations whose position was determined astronomically. Bayer proposed to remeasure ten arcs of meridians and a larger number of arcs of parallels, to compare the curvature of the meridian arcs on the two slopes of the Alps, in order to determine the influence of this mountain range on vertical deflection. Baeyer also planned to determine the curvature of the seas, the Mediterranean Sea and Adriatic Sea in the south, the North Sea and the Baltic Sea in the north. In his mind, the cooperation of all the States of Central Europe could open the field to scientific research of the highest interest, research that each State, taken in isolation, was not able to undertake. Following a preliminary consultation between representatives of Prussia, Austria and Saxony in April 1862, in which August von Fligely, Karl Ludwig Littrow, Josef Philipp Herr, Julius Ludwig Weisbach, Christian August Nagel and Karl Christian Bruhns took part, the Central European Arc Measurement (German: Mitteleuropäische Gradmessung) was established in Berlin in October 1864. At the time of its creation, the association had sixteen member countries: Austrian Empire, Kingdom of Belgium, Denmark, seven German states (Grand Duchy of Baden, Kingdom of Bavaria, Kingdom of Hanover, Mecklenburg, Kingdom of Prussia, Kingdom of Saxony, Saxe-Coburg and Gotha), Kingdom of Italy, Netherlands, Russian Empire (for Poland), United Kingdoms of Sweden and Norway, as well as Switzerland. (Note: Spain and Portugal joined the European Arc Measurement in 1866. French Empire hesitated for a long time before giving in to the demands of the Association, which asked the French geodesists to take part in its work. It was only after the Franco-Prussian War, that Charles-Eugène Delaunay represented France at the Congress of Vienna in 1871. In 1874, Hervé Faye was appointed member of the Permanent Commission which was presided by Carlos Ibáñez e Ibáñez de Ibero.) The Central European Arc Measurement created a Central Office, located at the Prussian Geodetic Institute, whose management was entrusted to Johann Jacob Baeyer. As early as 1864, the Association appointed a Permanent Commission with administrative powers which supervised the Central Bureau and became the supreme scientific body of the geodetic association. This Commission was chaired by Peter Andreas Hansen from 1864 to 1868, by the Austro-Hungarian general August von Fligely from 1869 to 1874 and by the Spanish general Carlos Ibáñez e Ibáñez de Ibero from 1874 to 1886.

=== European Arc Measurement ===
In 1866, in Neuchâtel, Carlos Ibáñez e Ibáñez de Ibero proposed the membership of Spain in the geodetic association. (Note: Since the metre was originally defined, each time a new measurement is made, with more accurate instruments, methods or techniques, it is said that the metre is based on some error, from calculations or measurements. When Carlos Ibáñez e Ibáñez de Ibero took part to the extension of the arc measurement of Delambre and Méchain, mathematicians like Legendre and Gauss had developed new methods for processing data, including the least squares method which allowed to compare experimental data tainted with observational errors to a mathematical model. Until the Hayford ellipsoid would be introduced in 1910, vertical deflections would be considered as random errors. The Earth measurements thus underscored the importance of the scientific method at a time when statistics were implemented in geodesy. As a leading scientist of his time, Ibáñez was one of the 81 initial members of the International Statistical Institute (ISI) and delegate of Spain to the first ISI session (now called World Statistic Congress) in Rome in 1887.) In 1867, at its second general conference in Berlin and after the admission of Spain and Portugal, the geodetic association became the Europäische Gradmessung (European Arc Measurement). France, the initiator of arc measurement efforts, remained largely stagnant while other nations covered their land with triangulations, employing superior instruments and methods of observation and calculation. It even hesitated for a long time before yielding to the European Arc Measurement's requests to participate in its work. It was only in 1871 that France began to join, appointing Charles-Eugène Delaunay to represent it at the Congress in Vienna. In 1874, Hervé Faye was appointed a member of the Permanent Commission. He would succeed Carlos Ibáñez e Ibáñez de Ibero as president of the International Geodetic Association after the latter's death in 1891.

The European Arc Measurement decided the creation of an international geodetic standard at the General Conference held in Paris in 1875. Thus, the Commission resolved to acquire, at common expense, a measuring instrument which was to be used either to measure new bases in countries which did not have their own device or to repeat previous measurements. The comparisons of the new results with those provided by the old national standards would make it possible to obtain their equation. The apparatus would to be calibrated at the International Bureau of Weights and Measures (BIPM), using the international prototype metre. The system with a microscope and bimetallic rulers, which had given such brilliant results in Spain, was proposed.

The European Arc Measurement, which had covered Europe with a network of fundamental longitudes, took an interest in the question of an internationally-accepted prime meridian at its seventh general conference in Rome in 1883. From a scientific point of view, to be a candidate for the status of international prime meridian, the proponent needed to satisfy three important criteria. According to the report by Carlos Ibáñez e Ibáñez de Ibero, it must have a first-rate astronomical observatory, be directly linked by astronomical observations to other nearby observatories, and be attached to a network of first-rate triangles in the surrounding country. The conference concluded that Greenwich Observatory best corresponded to the geographical, nautical, astronomical and cartographic conditions that guided the choice of an international prime meridian, and recommended the governments should adopt it as the world standard. The Conference further hoped that, if the whole world agreed on the unification of longitudes and times by the Association's choosing the Greenwich meridian, Great Britain might respond in favour of the unification of weights and measures, by adhering to the Metre Convention.

=== International Geodetic Association ===
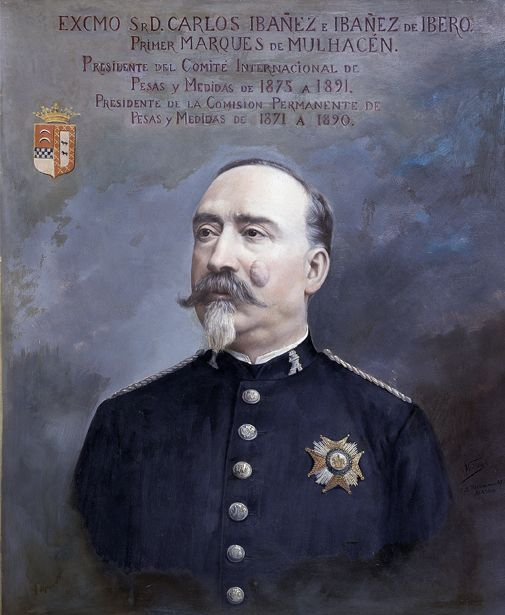
Carlos Ibáñez e Ibáñez de Ibero (1825-1891).

To encompass all measurements made outside Europe, the European Arc Measurement was reorganized after the death of its founder, Baeyer. The Prussian government initiated the reform. At a conference held in Berlin in October 1886, delegates from the major European countries (excluding England) and from several other parts of the world decided that the International Geodetic Association would aim arc measurements across the entire Earth; that it would have a central Bureau of Calculations in Berlin; that a Permanent Commission of 11 members would meet annually in a city of the associated states; and that the Association would hold a plenary meeting every three years at which half of the Permanent Commission would be renewed. Carlos Ibáñez e Ibáñez de Ibero was then appointed president of this Commission, and Friedrich Robert Helmert director of the Central Bureau of Calculations. A new international convention was ratified by 20 European states, which conferred intergovernmental status upon the Association.The 1886 Convention entrusted the execution of the decisions of the General Conference and the management of administrative affairs to the Bureau of the association, composed of the president and vice-president of the association, the permanent secretary, and the director of the Central Bureau. Adolphe Hirsch, one of the two secretaries of the Central European Arc Measurement since its creation, became its first permanent secretary until 1900.

In Rome, in 1887, the International Geodetic Association and the International Committee for Weights and Measures were represented at the first session of the International Statistical Institute (ISI) by their president, Carlos Ibáñez e Ibáñez de Ibero, first director of the Geographic and Statistical Institute, member of the Royal Academy of Exact, Physical and Natural Sciences, honorary member of the National Academy of Sciences of Córdoba, correspondent of the French Academy of Sciences, associate of the Royal Academy of Belgium and honorary member of the Prussian Academy of Sciences. (Note: The International Statistical Institute (ISI) was founded in 1885 during the jubilee of the Royal Statistical Society, and coinciding with the 25th anniversary of the Société statistique de Paris. Its origins can be traced back to a series of International Statistical Congresses, the first of which was chaired by Adolphe Quetelet and held in Brussels in 1853 after the Great Exhibition held in London at the initiative of Prince Albert of Saxe-Coburg and Gotha. The 81 founding members of the ISI constituted the elite of statisticians of this era within government administrations and scientific academies.) In the second half of the 19th century, this scientific undertaking, whose objective was precise mapping, took on a global dimension. It accompanied German unification and the return of democracy in France, marked the beginning of the Second Industrial Revolution, and led to the Metre Convention, the adoption of Greenwich meridian as Prime meridian and a new definition of the metre. (Note: The creation of the United States Coast and Geodetic Survey led to the actual definition of the metre, with Charles Sanders Peirce being the first to experimentally link the metre to the wavelength of a spectral line. Charles Sanders Peirce's work promoted the advent of American science at the forefront of global metrology. Alongside his intercomparisons of artifacts of the metre and contributions to gravimetry through improvement of reversible pendulum, Peirce was the first to tie experimentally the metre to the wave length of a spectral line. According to him the standard length might be compared with that of a wave of light identified by a line in the solar spectrum. Albert Abraham Michelson soon took up the idea and improved it. Progress in science finally allowed the definition of the metre to be dematerialised; thus in 1960 a new definition based on a specific number of wavelengths of light from a specific transition in krypton-86 allowed the standard to be universally available by measurement. In 1983 this was updated to a length defined in terms of the speed of light; this definition was reworded in 2019: The metre, symbol m, is the SI unit of length. It is defined by taking the fixed numerical value of the speed of light in vacuum c to be 299792458 when expressed in the unit m⋅s^{−1}, where the second is defined in terms of the caesium frequency Δν_{Cs}. Where older traditional length measures are still used, they are now defined in terms of the metre – for example the yard has since 1959 officially been defined as exactly 0.9144 metre.) In 1858, an Egyptian Technical Commission had been set up to continue, by adopting the procedures instituted in Europe, the cadastre work, inaugurated by means of the cassaba (Qaṣbah قصبة an ancient Arabic unit of measurement), under Muhammad Ali. This Commission suggested to Viceroy Mohammed Sa'id Pasha the idea of building geodetic devices which were ordered in France. The Khedive entrusted to Ismail Mustafa al-Falaki the study, in Europe, of the precision apparatus calibrated against the metre intended to measure the geodetic baselines and already built by Jean Brunner in Paris. Ismail Mustafa had the task to carry out the experiments necessary for determining the expansion coefficients of the two platinum and brass rulers, and to compare Egyptian standard with a known standard. The Spanish standard designed by Carlos Ibáñez e Ibáñez de Ibero and Frutos Saavedra Meneses was chosen for this purpose, as it had served as a model for the construction of the Egyptian standard. In addition, the Spanish standard had been compared with Borda's double-toise N° 1, which served as a comparison module for the measurement of all geodetic baselines in France. The Struve Geodetic Arc would become part of the longest meridian arc of the Old World. In 1954, the connection of the southerly extension of the Struve Arc with an arc running north from South Africa through Egypt would bring the course of a major meridian arc back to land where Eratosthenes had founded geodesy. (Note: Egypt was, after the United States of America and Spain in Europe, the first country in Africa to use a geodetic standard calibrated against the metre. The history of the metre reveals that it was then chosen as an international scientific unit of length by the European Arc Measurement which would later become the International Association of Geodesy. The inspiration for the creation of this association came to Johann Jacob Baeyer following the measurement of the geodetic arc of Struve. In 1867 at the second General Conference of the International Association of Geodesy held in Berlin, the question of an international standard unit of length was discussed in order to combine the measurements made in different countries to determine the size and shape of the Earth. According to a preliminary proposal made in Neuchâtel the precedent year, the General Conference of the European Arc Measurement recommended the adoption of the metre in replacement of the toise of Bessel. In 1869, the Saint Petersburg Academy of Sciences sent to the French Academy of Sciences a report drafted by Otto Wilhelm von Struve, Heinrich von Wild, and Moritz von Jacobi inviting his French counterpart to undertake joint action to ensure the universal use of the metric system in all scientific work. In 1954, the connection of the southerly extension of the Struve Geodetic Arc with an arc running north from South Africa through Egypt brought the course of a major meridian arc back to land where Eratosthenes had founded geodesy.)

In 1891, at the meeting of the Permanent Commission of the International Geodetic Association in Florence, Wilhelm Foerster referred to the discovery by Seth Carlo Chandler of the polar motion predicted by Leonhard Euler in 1765 and his impact on the determination latitudes. He proposed that the International Geodetic Association implement a systematic study of this important phenomenon. In 1895, the creation of the International Latitude Service was decided by the International Geodesic Association. Its central office was based in Potsdam and headed by Friedrich Robert Helmert. Regular observations began in 1899. The distinction between systematic and random errors is far from being as sharp as one might think at first glance. In reality, there are no or very few random errors. As science progresses, the causes of certain errors are sought out, studied, their laws discovered. These errors pass from the class of random errors into that of systematic errors. The ability of the observer consists in discovering the greatest possible number of systematic errors to be able, once he has become acquainted with their laws, to free his results from them using a method or appropriate corrections. It was the experimental study of causes of errors that has led to most of the great astronomical discoveries (precession, nutation, aberration).

The International Geodetic Association gained global importance with the accession of Chile, Mexico and Japan in 1888; Argentina and United-States in 1889; and British Empire in 1898. From 1903 to 1917, Jean-Antonin-Léon Bassot succeeded Hervé Faye as president of the International Geodetic Association. The convention of the International Geodetic Association expired at the end of 1916. It was not renewed due to the First World War. However, the activities of the International Latitude Service were continued through an Association Géodesique réduite entre États neutres thanks to the efforts of H.G. van de Sande Bakhuyzen and Raoul Gautier, respectively directors of Leiden Observatory and Geneva Observatory. During the war, many scientists were concerned with the means to be considered for resuming, at the end of hostilities, international scientific work. An essentially American and British idea was to group together the scientific unions relating to various disciplines under the authority of a Supreme Council. An international conference, which brought together in Brussels in July 1919 the scientists of the countries allied or associated in the fight against Germany and of a certain number of neutral states, created an International Science Council and various unions dependent on this Council; but, Geodesy, instead of being free and independent as before, was associated with the Geophysical Sciences in the International Union of Geodesy and Geophysics which first president was Charles Jean-Pierre Lallemand.

== Implementation of new scientific methods ==
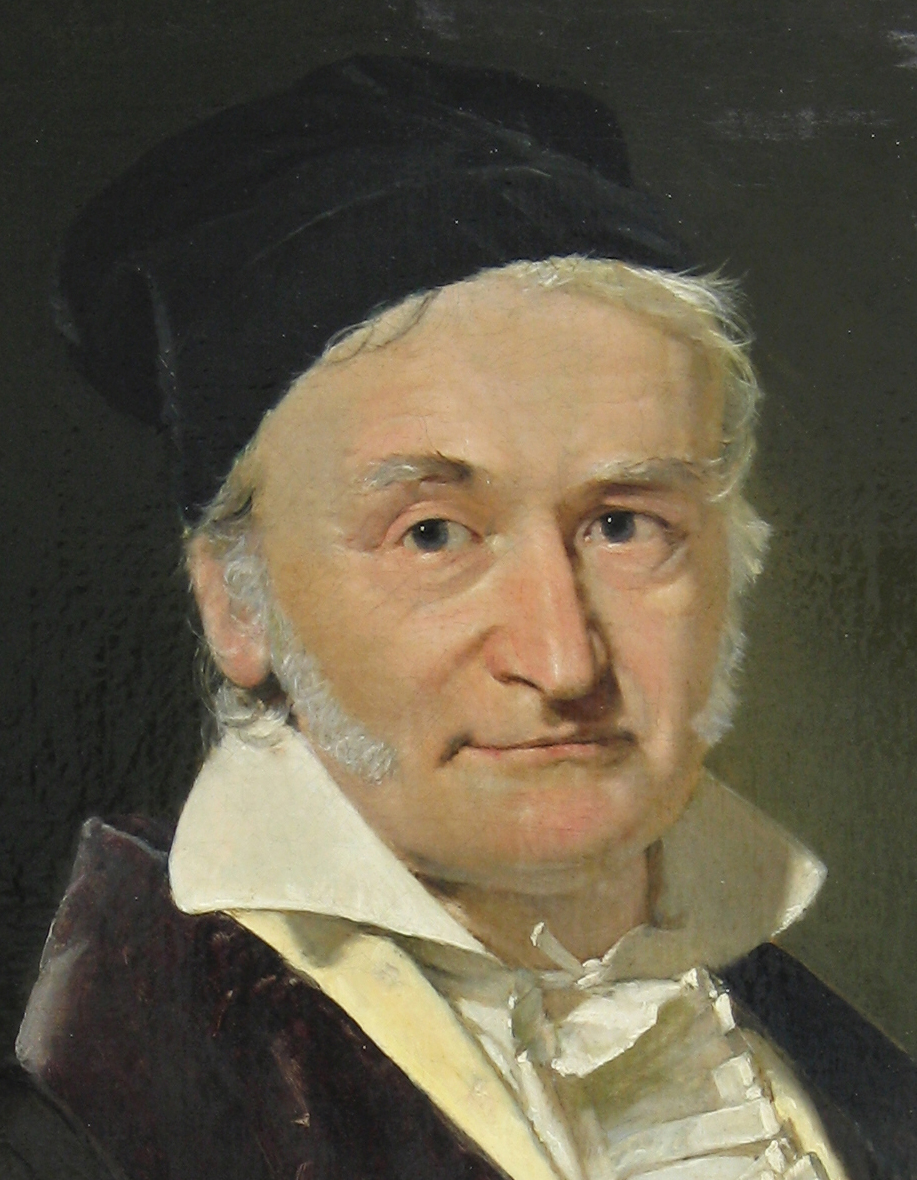
Portrait of the mathematician and philosopher Carl Friedrich Gauss nicknamed the Prince of mathematicians.

The creation of the Central European Arc Measurement marked, following the examples of Carl Friedrich Gauss, Friedrich Wilhelm Bessel and Friedrich Georg Wilhelm von Struve, the systematic adoption of more rigorous scientific methods, including the application of the least squares method in geodesy.

In 1809 Carl Friedrich Gauss published his method of calculating the orbits of celestial bodies. In that work he claimed to have been in possession of the method of least squares since 1795. This naturally led to a priority dispute with Adrien-Marie Legendre. However, to Gauss's credit, he went beyond Legendre and succeeded in connecting the method of least squares with the principles of probability and to the normal distribution. He had managed to complete Laplace's program of specifying a mathematical form of the probability density for the observations, depending on a finite number of unknown parameters, and define a method of estimation that minimises the error of estimation. Gauss showed that the arithmetic mean is indeed the best estimate of the location parameter by changing both the probability density and the method of estimation. He then turned the problem around by asking what form the density should have and what method of estimation should be used to get the arithmetic mean as estimate of the location parameter. In this attempt, he invented the normal distribution.

Like numerous astronomers of his time Bessel dealt on the field of geodesy, too, first theoretically, when he published a method for solving the main geodetic problem. In 1830 he got the royal order for the survey of East Prussia with the purpose to connect the yet existing Prussian and Russian triangulation networks. This work was carried out in cooperation with Johann Jacob Baeyer, then major of the Prussian army; the final report was published in 1838. He also obtained an estimate of increased accuracy for the Earth's ellipsoid, nowadays called the Bessel ellipsoid, based on several arc measurements.

Struve Geodetic Arc.

The Scandinavian-Russian meridian arc or Struve Geodetic Arc, named after the German astronomer Friedrich Georg Wilhelm von Struve, was a degree measurement that consisted of a nearly 3000 km long network of geodetic survey points. The Struve Geodetic Arc was one of the most precise and largest projects of Earth measurement at that time. In 1860 Friedrich Georg Wilhelm Struve published his Arc du méridien de 25° 20′ entre le Danube et la Mer Glaciale mesuré depuis 1816 jusqu’en 1855. The flattening of the Earth was estimated at 1/294.26 and the Earth's equatorial radius was estimated at 6378360.7 metres. Struve's arc measurement spanned a period of forty years and initiated an international scientific collaboration between the Russian Empire and the Swedish-Norwegian Union, involving prominent astronomers such as Friedrich Georg Wilhelm von Struve, Friedrich Wilhelm Bessel, Carl Friedrich Gauss and George Biddell Airy.

Many measurements of degrees of longitudes along central parallels in Europe were projected and partly carried out as early as the first half of the 19th century; these, however, only became of importance after the introduction of the electrical telegraph, through which calculations of astronomical longitudes obtained a much higher degree of accuracy. Of the greatest moment is the measurement near the parallel of 52° lat., which extended from Valentia in Ireland to Orsk in the southern Ural mountains over 69 degrees of longitude. F. G. W. Struve, who is to be regarded as the father of the Russo-Scandinavian latitude-degree measurements, was the originator of this investigation. Having made the requisite arrangements with the governments in 1857, he transferred them to his son Otto, who, in 1860, secured the co-operation of England.

After the Struve Geodetic Arc measurement, it was resolved in the 1860s to remeasure the arc of meridian from Dunkirk to Formentera and to extend it from Shetland to the Sahara. Since the arc measurement of Delambre and Méchain, Friedrich Wilhelm Bessel using the method of least squares had calculated from several arc measurements a new value for the flattening of the Earth, which he determined as 1/299.15. (Note: Errors in the method of calculating the length of the arc measurement of Delambre and Méchain were taken into account by Bessel when he proposed his reference ellipsoid in 1841. The definitive length of the Mètre des Archives had required a value for the non-spherical shape of the Earth, known as the flattening of the Earth. The Weights and Measures Commission adopted, in 1799, a flattening of 1/334 based on analysis by Pierre-Simon Laplace who combined the arc of Peru and the data of the meridian arc of Delambre and Méchain. Combining these two data sets Laplace succeeded to estimate the flattening anew and was happy to find the suitable value 1/334. It also fitted well with his estimate 1/336 based on 15 pendulum measurements Bessel's reference ellipsoid would long be used by geodesists. An even more accurate value was proposed in 1901 by Friedrich Robert Helmert according to gravity measurements performed under the auspices of the International Geodetic Association.) Seventeen years after Bessel calculated his ellipsoid of reference, some of the meridian arcs the German astronomer had used for his calculation had been enlarged. This was a very important circumstance because the influence of random errors due to vertical deflections was minimized in proportion to the length of the meridian arcs: the longer the meridian arcs, the more precise the image of the Earth ellipsoid would be.

In 1859, Friedrich von Schubert demonstrated that several meridians had not the same length, confirming an hypothesis of Georges-Louis Leclerc, Comte de Buffon. He also proposed an ellipsoid with three unequal axes. In 1860, Elie Ritter, a mathematician from Geneva, using Schubert's data computed that the Earth ellipsoid could rather be a spheroid of revolution accordingly to Adrien-Marie Legendre's model. However, the following year, resuming his calculation on the basis of all the data available at the time, Ritter came to the conclusion that the problem was only resolved in an approximate manner, the data appearing too scant, and for some affected by vertical deflections, in particular the latitude of Montjuïc in the French meridian arc which determination had also been affected in a lesser proportion by systematic errors of the repeating circle. (Note: It was well known that by measuring the latitude of two stations in Barcelona, Méchain had found that the difference between these latitudes was greater than predicted by direct measurement of distance by triangulation and that he did not dare to admit this inaccuracy. This was later explained by clearance in the central axis of the repeating circle causing wear and consequently the zenith measurements contained significant systematic errors. Polar motion predicted by Leonhard Euler and later discovered by Seth Carlo Chandler also had an impact on accuracy of latitudes' determinations. Among all these sources of error, it was mainly an unfavourable vertical deflection that gave an inaccurate determination of Barcelona's latitude and a metre "too short" compared to a more general definition taken from the average of a large number of arcs.)

== Baselines measurements ==
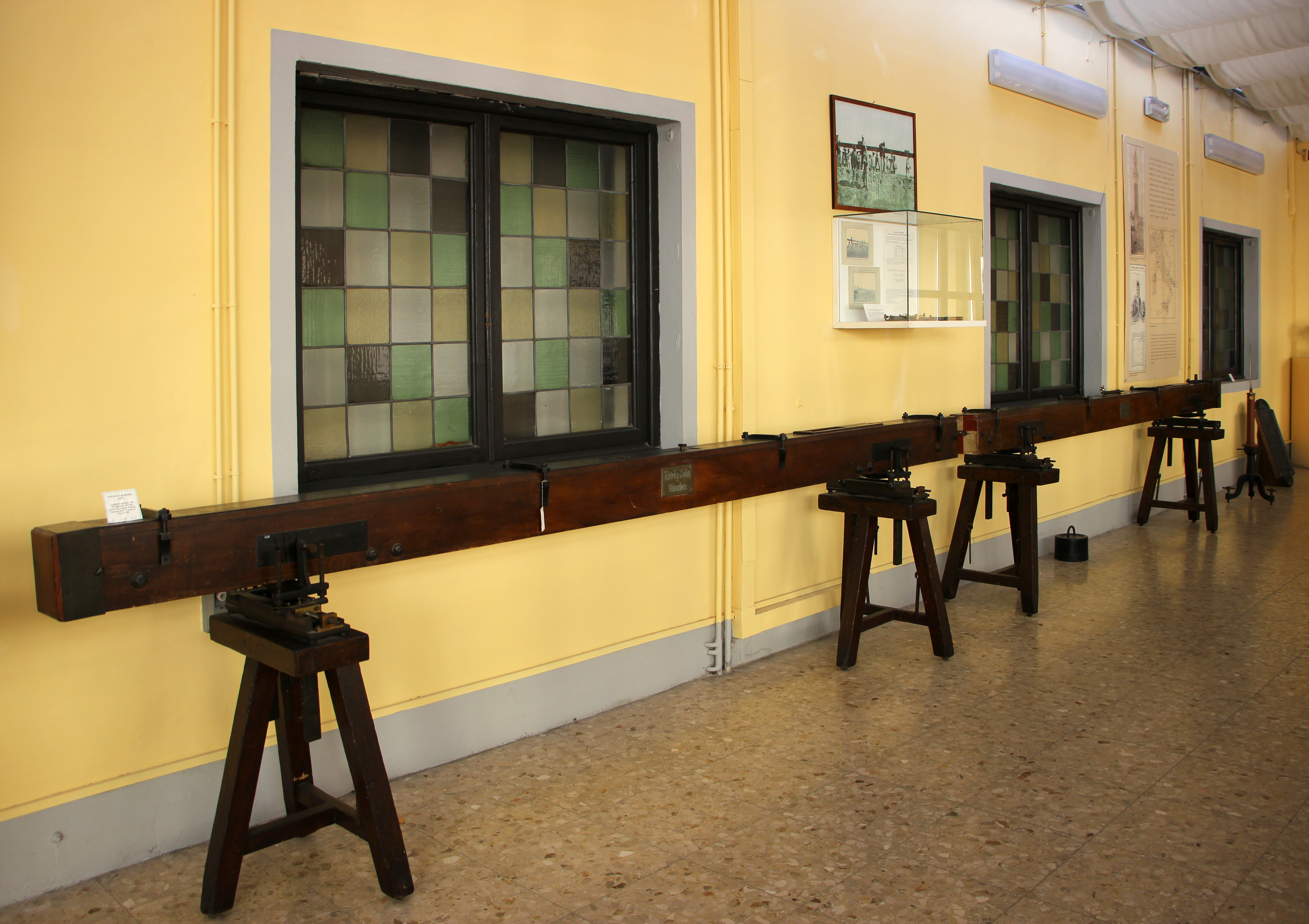
Bessel's apparatus at the Museum of Instruments of the Military Geographic Institute of Florence.

At the first general meeting of the Central European Arc Measurement held in Berlin in 1864, it was decided to adopt the Bessel Toise, a copy of the Toise of Peru made in 1923 by Jean-Nicolas Fortin in Paris, as the international standard. In order to avoid the difficulty in exactly determining the temperature of a bar by the mercury thermometer, Friedrich Wilhelm Bessel, inspired by Jean-Charles de Borda, introduced in 1834 near Königsberg a compound bar which constituted a metallic thermometer. A zinc bar was laid on an iron bar two toises long, both bars being perfectly planed and in free contact, the zinc bar being slightly shorter and the two bars rigidly united at one end. As the temperature varied, the difference of the lengths of the bars, as perceived by the other end, also varied, and afforded a quantitative correction for temperature variations, which was applied to reduce the length to standard temperature. During the measurement of the base line the bars were not allowed to come into contact, the interval being measured by the insertion of glass wedges. The results of the comparisons of four measuring rods with one another and with the standards were elaborately computed by the method of least-squares.These comparisons were essential. Indeed, thermal expansion, which corresponds to the increase in volume of a body caused by heating, was already well known at the time. Pierre Bouguer had demonstrated it to a large audience at the Hôtel des Invalides. This problem has consistently dominated all thinking regarding the measurement of geodetic standards. Geodesists were preoccupied with the constant concern of accurately determining the temperature of the length standards used in the field. Determining this variable, on which the length of measuring instruments depends, has always been considered so complex and so important that one could almost say that the history of geodetic standards corresponds to the history of the precautions taken to avoid temperature errors.

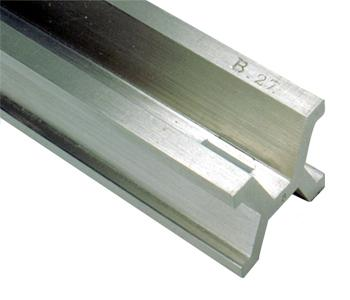
Closeup of National Prototype Metre Bar No. 27, made in 1889 by the International Bureau of Weights and Measures (BIPM) in collaboration with Johnson Mattey and given to the United States, which served as the standard for American cartography from 1890 replacing the Committee Meter, an authentic copy of the Mètre des Archives produced in 1799 in Paris, which Ferdinand Rudolph Hassler had brought to the United States in 1805.

When Spain decided the creation of a large-scale map of Spain in 1852, Carlos Ibáñez e Ibáñez de Ibero recognized that the end standards with which the most perfect devices of the eighteenth century and those of the first half of the nineteenth century were still equipped, that Jean-Charles de Borda or Friedrich Wilhelm Bessel simply joined measuring the intervals by means of vernier callipers or glass wedges, would be replaced advantageously for accuracy by microscopic measurements, a system designed in Switzerland by Ferdinand Rudolph Hassler and Johann Georg Tralles, and which Ibáñez ameliorated using a single standard with lines marked on the bar. (Note: Following the Act of Mediation of 1803, Swiss cartography was entrusted to French geographical engineers. Geneva, which was part of France, was not affected by this issue. However, Ferdinand Rudolph Hassler, a former magistrate from Aargau in the Helvetic Republic, saw his prospects of creating a map of Switzerland dashed. He therefore emigrated to the United States of America where Albert Gallatin, then Secretary of the Treasury, was launching a call for tenders for heading the geodetic survey of East Coast of the United States. Hassler was appointed, with the endorsement of the American Philosophical Society, Superintendent of the United States Survey of the Coast, which would become the first civilian scientific agency of the federal government. At the time, geodesists incorporated reference points into a network of triangles. The relative positions of these points were determined by the angles of the triangles formed by the triangulation stations, and also by astronomical observations. Finally, the dimensions of the network of triangles were determined by measuring the length of one side of some of the triangles in the field using metal rulers. For measuring the baselines of the map survey of the American coast, Hassler designed a ruler equipped with microscopes, which he calibrated to the Committee Meter.) (Note: In 1834, Ferdinand Rudolph Hassler measured at Fire Island the first baseline of the Survey of the Coast. Ferdinand Rudolph Hassler's use of the metre and the creation of the Office of Standard Weights and Measures as an office within the Coast Survey contributed to the introduction of the Metric Act of 1866 allowing the use of the metre in the United States, and preceded the choice of the metre as international scientific unit of length and the proposal by the 1867 General Conference of the European Arc Measurement (German: Europäische Gradmessung) to establish the International Bureau of Weights and Measures.) Ignazio Porro also designed such optical measuring devices, initially equipped with a wooden rod, then with bimetallic rulers.

In continental Europe, surveyors continued to use measuring instruments calibrated on the Toise of Peru. Ibáñez and Frutos Saavedra Meneses went to Paris to supervise the production by Jean Brunner of a four metres long measuring instrument which they had devised. In 1856, the length of the rulers was determined by comparison with Borda's double-toise N°1 which was the main reference for measuring all geodetic baselines in France and whose length was by definition 3.8980732 metres at a specified temperature. From 1865 to 1868, Carlos Ibáñez e Ibáñez de Ibero added the survey of the Balearic Islands with that of the Iberian Peninsula. For this work, he devised a new instrument. This device, called the Ibáñez apparatus, was calibrated on the Spanish standard and would be used in Switzerland to measure the geodetic bases of Aarberg, Weinfelden and Gubiasco near Bellinzona. In June 1886, following these operations, the Ibáñez apparatus was recalibrated on Brunner's international bimetallic device (itself calibrated on the international prototype metre) at the International Bureau of Weights and Measures (BIPM).

In the 19th century, statisticians knew that scientific observations were subject to two types of error: constant errors and random errors. The effects of the latter could be corrected using the least squares method. Constant errors, on the other hand, had to be carefully avoided, as they were caused by various factors that consistently altered the results of observations in the same direction. These errors thus tended to render the results they affected worthless. Consider, for example, measuring a straight line to determine its length in metres. If a metal ruler is used for this measurement, and an error is made in determining the temperature at which its length corresponds to that of a metre, all observations will be affected by a consistent error stemming from this error, and no matter how many times the operation is repeated, it will be impossible to obtain an accurate result. If, on the contrary, we know exactly the temperature at which the ruler is equivalent to the metre and if the error affects the actual temperature of the ruler in the different observations, each observation will be affected by a random error, but these errors will occur sometimes in one direction and sometimes in the other, and by repeating the operation a large number of times we can hope to eliminate their effect by compensating for them.

In the absence of a standard temperature scale, inconsistencies arose when attempting to link geodetic surveys from different countries to create a European geodetic network. It was thus crucial to compare at controlled temperatures with great precision and to the same unit all the standards for measuring geodetic baselines. In 1886, Adolphe Hisch, secretary of the International Committee for Weights and Measures (CIPM) and of the International Geodetic Association, proposed that all the toises that had served as geodetic standards in Europe during the 19th century be compared at the BIPM with the Toise of Peru and with the new international metre so that the measurements made until then could be used to measure the Earth. The result of these comparisons made it possible to reduce the arcs measured in Germany to the metre. The discordance of 1/(66 000) which remained between the triangles common to the German and French networks could be reduced to 1/(600 000) which was at the limit of accuracy of geodetic surveys at the time. In fact, the length of Bessel's Toise, which according to the then legal ratio between the metre and the Toise of Peru, should be equal to 1.9490348 m, would be found to be 26.2·10^{−6} m greater during measurements carried out by Jean-René Benoît at the BIPM. It was the consideration of the divergences between the different toises used by geodesists that led the European Arc Measurement (German: Europäische Gradmessung ) to consider, at the meeting of its Permanent Commission in Neuchâtel in 1866, the founding of a World Institute for the Comparison of Geodetic Standards, the first step towards the creation of the BIPM.

Careful comparisons with several standard toises showed that the international metre calibrated on the Mètre des Archives was not exactly equal to the legal metre or 443.296 lines of the toise, but, in round numbers, 1/(75 000) of the length smaller, or approximately 0.013 millimetres. (Note: In 1875 a number of American, Asian, African and European states concluded the Metre Convention, and in 1877 an international weights-and-measures bureau was established at Breteuil. Until this time the metre was determined by the end-surfaces of a platinum rod (mètre des archives); subsequently, rods of platinum-iridium, of cross-section H, were constructed, having engraved lines at both ends of the bridge, which determine the distance of a metre. As bar lengths vary with temperature, precise measurements required known and stable temperatures and could even be affected by a scientist's body heat, so standard metres were provided with precise thermometers. The thermometers required for this purpose must be very carefully studied, and their errors of division and index error determined. The representation of the unit of length by means of the distance between two fine lines on the surface of a bar of metal at a certain temperature is never itself free from uncertainty and probable error, owing to the difficulty of knowing at any moment the precise temperature of the bar; and the transference of this unit, or a multiple of it, to a measuring bar will be affected not only with errors of observation, but with errors arising from uncertainty of temperature of both bars. If the measuring bar be not self-compensating for temperature, its expansion must be determined by very careful experiments. Careful comparisons with several standard toises showed that the Mètre des Archives was not exactly equal to the legal metre or 443.296 lines of the toise of Peru, but, in round numbers, 1/(75 000) of the length smaller, or approximately 0.013 millimetres. The metre according to the older relation is called the “legal metre,” according to the new relation the “international metre.”) By contrast, in 2007, a comparison of the American Committee meter and its Swiss counterpart was carried out at NIST and METAS. (Note: From geodesists point of view, the Mètre des Archives was a secondary standard deduced from the Toise of Peru. When, in 1799, the results necessary for the practical and definitive realization of the metre were available, the commission in charge of the matter decided to fully utilize the precision of the comparator developed by the engineer Étienne Lenoir. It fixed the length of the definitive metre at 3 feet 11.296 lines (or 443.296 lines). The law of 18 Germinal, Year III (April 7, 1795) stipulated that the metre should be drawn on a platinum ruler. Lenoir therefore constructed the prototype of the standard metre according to these criteria. Another platinum standard, as well as twelve other iron standards, were also produced in 1799.) The two metre standards can be considered perfectly equivalent, with a difference of only (0.96 ±3.0) micrometres. The poor quality of the measuring surfaces explained the significant uncertainty in the measurements compared to today's standards.

Assuming a linear thermal expansion coefficient of 11.6·10^{−6} °C^{-1} for steel, the difference between the legal metre (defined as 443.296 lines of the Toise of Peru) and the international metre (defined as the length of the Mètre des Archives) must be related to a temperature error of approximately 1.3 °C during the manufacturing of Borda apparatus, which was used for baseline measurements of the Arc measurement of Delambre and Méchain. A possibility first suspected by Johan Georg Tralles in 1799. Thus, a discrepancy of 1/65,000 emerged between the French and Spanish triangulations when the French network was recalculated in terms of the 1889 standard metre, which was itself calibrated against the Mètre des Archives. The French geodetic network, like the Spanish one, had previously relied on measurements taken with instruments calibrated against Borda’s "double-toise no. 1".

In his 2002 book The measure of all things, Ken Alder recalled that the legal metre is about 0.2 millimetres shorter than it should be according to its original proposed definition. However, the error in measuring the length of Paris meridian represented less than 2% of the total error, and the error due to a flawed assumption about the shape of the Earth contributed to approximately 3% of the total error. If the meticulous work of Pierre Méchain and Jean Baptiste Delambre were the only source of error, the current metre would be too long by less than 4 μm instead of being too short by 197 μm. The 95% of the missing length of the metre is due to the failure to account for vertical deflections; this was beyond the scope of Delambre and Méchain because the Earth's gravitational field had not yet been studied.

== Dynamic geodesy ==
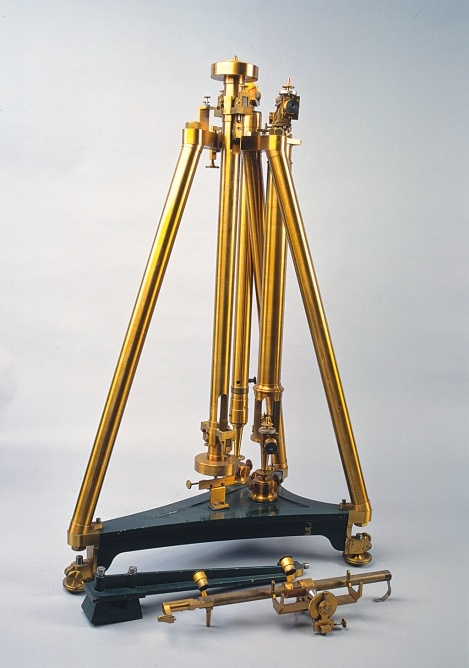
Gravimeter with variant of Repsold-Bessel pendulum.

Significant improvements in gravity measuring instruments must be attributed to Friedrich Wilhelm Bessel. He devised a gravimeter constructed by Adolf Repsold which was first used in Switzerland by Emile Plantamour, Charles Sanders Peirce and Isaac-Charles Élisée Cellérier (1818–1889), a Genevan mathematician soon independently discovered a mathematical formula to correct systematic errors of this device which had been noticed by Plantamour and Adolphe Hirsch. As the figure of the Earth could be inferred from variations of gravitational field, the United States Coast Survey's direction instructed Charles Sanders Peirce in the spring of 1875 to proceed to Europe for the purpose of making pendulum experiments to chief initial stations for operations of this sort, to bring the determinations of gravitational acceleration in America into communication with those of other parts of the world; and also for the purpose of making a careful study of the methods of pursuing these researches in the different countries of Europe.

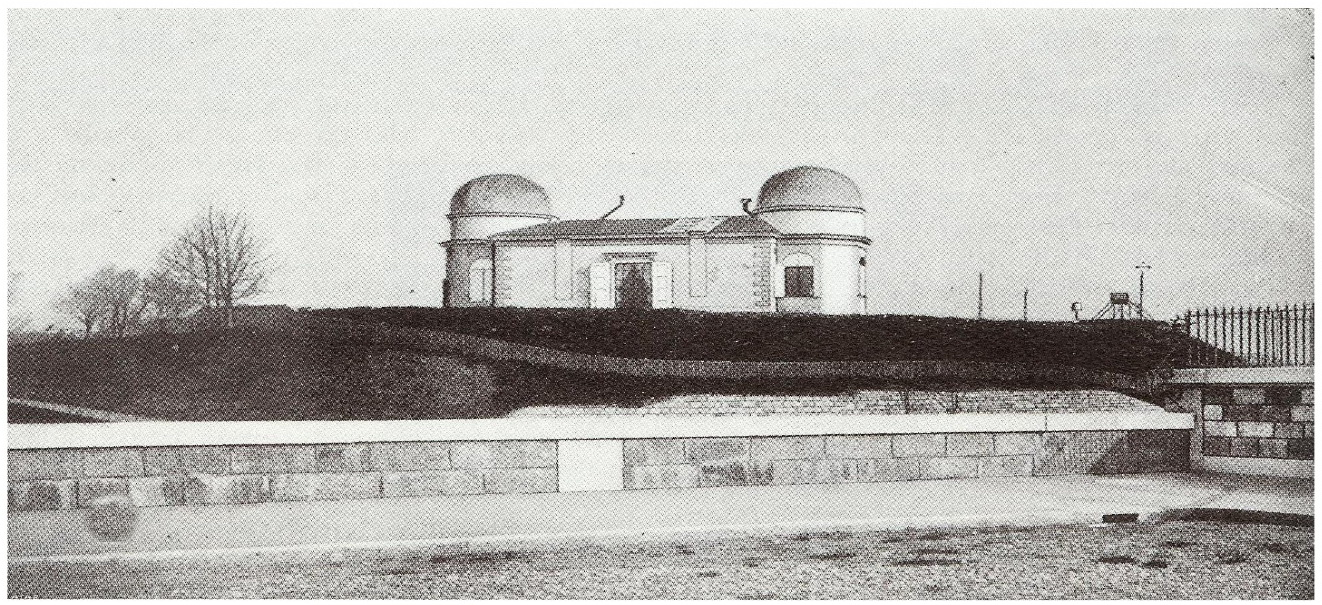
Geneva old Observatory 1830

In 1875, Charles Sanders Peirce conducted experiments at the Geneva Observatory with his reversible pendulum, and commissioned the Société genevoise d'instruments physiques (SIP) a vacuum chamber for his pendulum. The former Geneva Observatory was located on the Saint-Antoine bastion, now the Promenade de l’Observatoire, opposite the main entrance of the Musée d'Art et d'Histoire (1910). Built in 1772 at the initiative of Jacques-André Mallet, the Geneva Observatory was the first in Switzerland. In addition to astronomical observations, the institution carried out meteorological surveys and organized chronometer competitions. The role of observatories in assessing the accuracy of mechanical watches was crucial in driving the mechanical watchmaking industry toward ever-higher levels of precision. As a result, high-quality mechanical watch movements today achieve extremely high accuracy. The building was demolished in 1829 and rebuilt on the same site the following year by Guillaume Henri Dufour.

Significant improvements in gravity measuring instruments must also be attributed to Friedrich Wilhelm Bessel. In 1875, the Conference of the European Arc Measurement dealt with the best instrument to be used for the determination of gravitational acceleration. After an in-depth discussion in which Charles Sanders Peirce took part, the association decided in favor of the reversion pendulum, which was used in Switzerland, and it was resolved to redo in Berlin, in the station where Friedrich Wilhelm Bessel made his famous measurements, the determination of gravity by means of devices of various kinds employed in different countries, to compare them and thus to have the equation of their scales. This work led in 1901 to the Earth ellipsoid proposed by Friedrich Robert Helmert, whose parameter values were remarkably close to reality. Helmert determined a value of 1/298.3 for the flattening of the Earth to be compared with that of 1/298.25 obtained from the analysis of the first satellites measurements.

The progresses of metrology combined with those of gravimetry through gravimeters with variant of Repsold-Bessel pendulum led to a new era of geodesy. If precision metrology had needed the help of geodesy, it could not continue to prosper without the help of metrology. It was then necessary to define a single unit to express all the measurements of terrestrial arcs, and all determinations of the gravitational acceleration by the means of pendulum. Metrology had to create a common unit. The 1875 Conference of the International Association of Geodesy also dealt with the best instrument to be used for the determination of gravitational acceleration. After an in-depth discussion in which Charles Sanders Peirce took part, the association decided in favor of the reversion pendulum, which was used in Switzerland, and it was resolved to redo in Berlin, in the station where Friedrich Wilhelm Bessel made his famous measurements, the determination of gravity by means of devices of various kinds employed in different countries, to compare them and thus to have the equation of their scales. In 1901, Friedrich Robert Helmert found, mainly by gravimetry, parameters of the ellipsoid remarkably close to reality. Although marked by the concern to correct vertical deflections, taking into account the contributions of gravimetry, research between 1910 and 1950 remained practically limited to large continental triangulations. The most significant work would be that by John Fillmore Hayford, which relied mainly on the North American national network. His ellipsoid was adopted in 1924 by the International Union of Geodesy and Geophysics.
