= Swiss Geodetic Commission =

The Swiss Geodetic Commission is a commission of the Swiss Academy of Sciences, founded in 1861 within the framework of the Central European Arc Measurement, which later became the International Geodetic Association, and then the International Association of Geodesy.

It initiates and coordinates geodetic research in Switzerland. It plays an advisory role in the development of Swiss geodetic policies. It contributes to disseminating geodetic knowledge to the general public. It supports the expansion of Swiss geodetic infrastructure, including the introduction of innovative methodologies and technologies. It maintains links with international institutions such as the International Association of Geodesy and the International Union of Geodesy and Geophysics.

== History ==
To establish national boundaries and to obtain accurate values for the Earth ellipsoid, numerous arc measurements were made in the early 1800s. In the 1830s, Professor Friedrich Wilhelm Bessel recruited and trained Johan Jacob Baeyer to help with the Prussian arc measurement. In 1861, Johan Jacob Baeyer proposed a multinational effort to measure an arc across central Europe. The Swiss Society of Natural Sciences responded by forming the Swiss Geodetic Commission. The following year that commission considered submitting the data measured for the creation of the Dufour map to the new arc effort. They concluded that the earlier measurements were not sufficient, in part because they had not been based on the newly discovered method of Least Squares as stipulated by Baeyer.

The Swiss commission also arranged for the construction of a new pendulum for their measurements. After Alexis Claude Clairaut showed in 1743 that the length of a pendulum arm that ticked at one second per swing would vary according the pendulum's location on the Earth ellipsoid, pendulum technology was critical to accurate arc measurements. Bessel had died in 1849, but his posthumous work detailed a new kind of symmetric pendulum immune to errors due to displace air. Adolf Repsold built the new instrument which came to be known as the Repsold-Bessel pendulum.

Astronomical observations were carried out at observatories around the country for positioning the geodetic network. In order to determine the longitudes, time was transmitted via telegraph lines. New measurements and analysis were proposed and implemented, ultimately published in 1890.

Between 1864 and 1891, the Commission carried out the first measurement of leveled heights throughout Switzerland (published as the Nivellement de Precision). In 1901, the Commission began the first geoid computation for Switzerland, a map of the gravitational equipotential. It was expected that the geoid would be strongly affected by the Jura Mountains and the Alps. New measurements with improved technology occurred in 1939, 1969, and 1975. In 1978 geoid was created using only astronomical measurements.

== Current work ==
The commission continues its work today, combining fundamental research with stimulating its practical application.
