= IGSO =

IGSO may refer to:

- Inclined geosynchronous orbit, a special type of inclined orbit
- International Geodetic Student Organisation, an organisation run by and for geodesy students and young geodesists
