= Dufour Map =

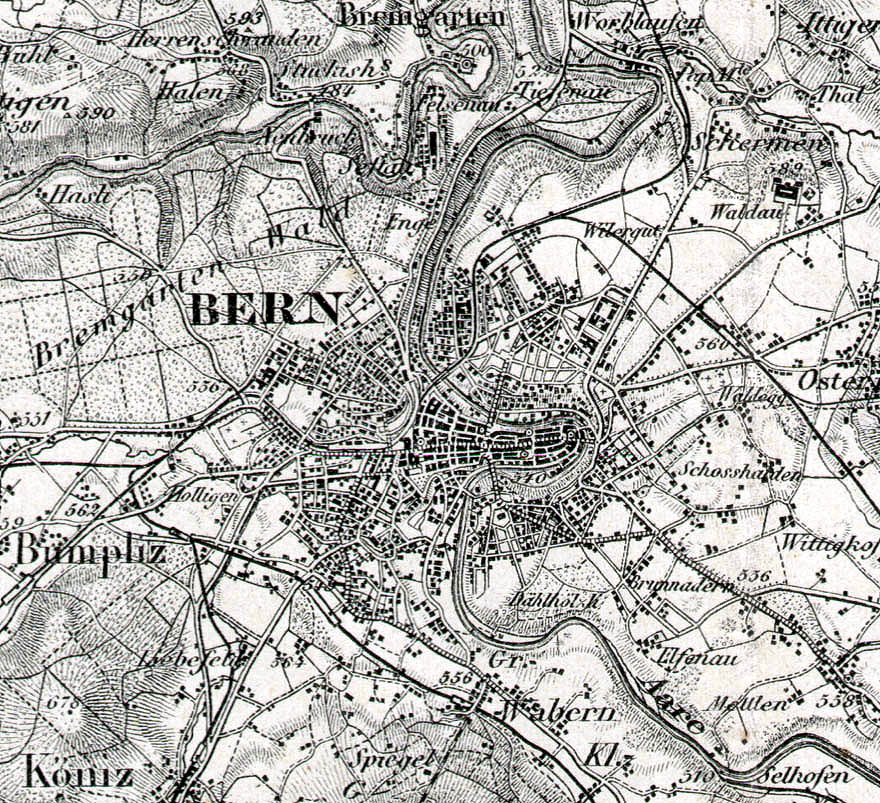
Bern as depicted on the Dufour Map

The Dufour Map (German: Dufourkarte; French: Carte Dufour) is a 1:100 000 scale map series depicting Switzerland for the first time based on accurate geometric measurements. It is also the oldest official map series of Switzerland.

== The Atlas Suisse as predecessor ==
From 1796 to 1802, the Atlas Suisse was published in Aarau by Johann Heinrich Weiss, Johann Rudolf Meyer and Joachim Eugen Müller.

The Atlas Suisse map series consisted of 16 sheets, was produced by a copperplate or intaglio printing process, and depicted the whole of Switzerland at a scale of 1:120,000.

== The Dufour Map ==
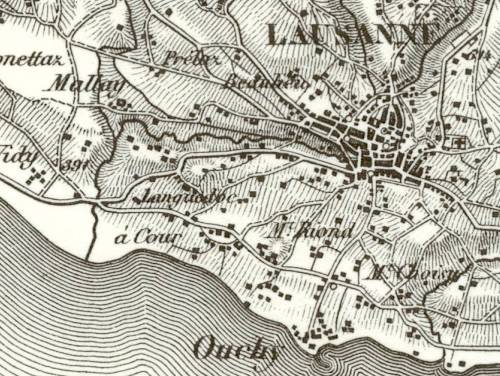
The Dufour Map depiction of Lausanne

In the 19th century in particular, learned societies contributed to the emergence of national consciousness and the emancipation of the bourgeoisie. Their members, who often held influential positions, formed a link between citizens and the administration. The societies carried out public tasks and brought together people of different faiths and backgrounds. They offered scholars the opportunity to freely exchange their ideas outside of academia. During the period of Geneva's annexation to France (1798-1813), the Société des Naturalistes took the name of Société de Physique et d'Histoire Naturelle (SPHN). Respectively since 1801 and 1805, Alessandro Volta and Alexander von Humboldt were honorary members of the SPHN. Henri-Albert Gosse, its founder in 1791, was also behind the creation of the Swiss Academy of Natural Sciences, the first of its kind in Europe, in 1815. In the same year, Switzerland expanded from 19 to 22 cantons with the accession of the cantons of Geneva, Neuchâtel and Valais. Guillaume-Henri Dufour, cantonal engineer in Geneva since 1817 and commissioned by the Federal Diet to superintend land surveying of Switzerland, founded in 1838 in Carouge (canton of Geneva) a topographic office (the future Federal Office of topography), which published under his direction, from 1845 to 1864, the first official map of Switzerland, on the basis of new cantonal measurements. The map of the canton of Geneva, which can be considered Dufour's masterpiece, had been published in 1842. After the Sonderbund War, the country pacified by Guillaume-Henri Dufour adopted a new Swiss Federal Constitution, inspired by the Constitution of the United States, founding the federal state in 1848.

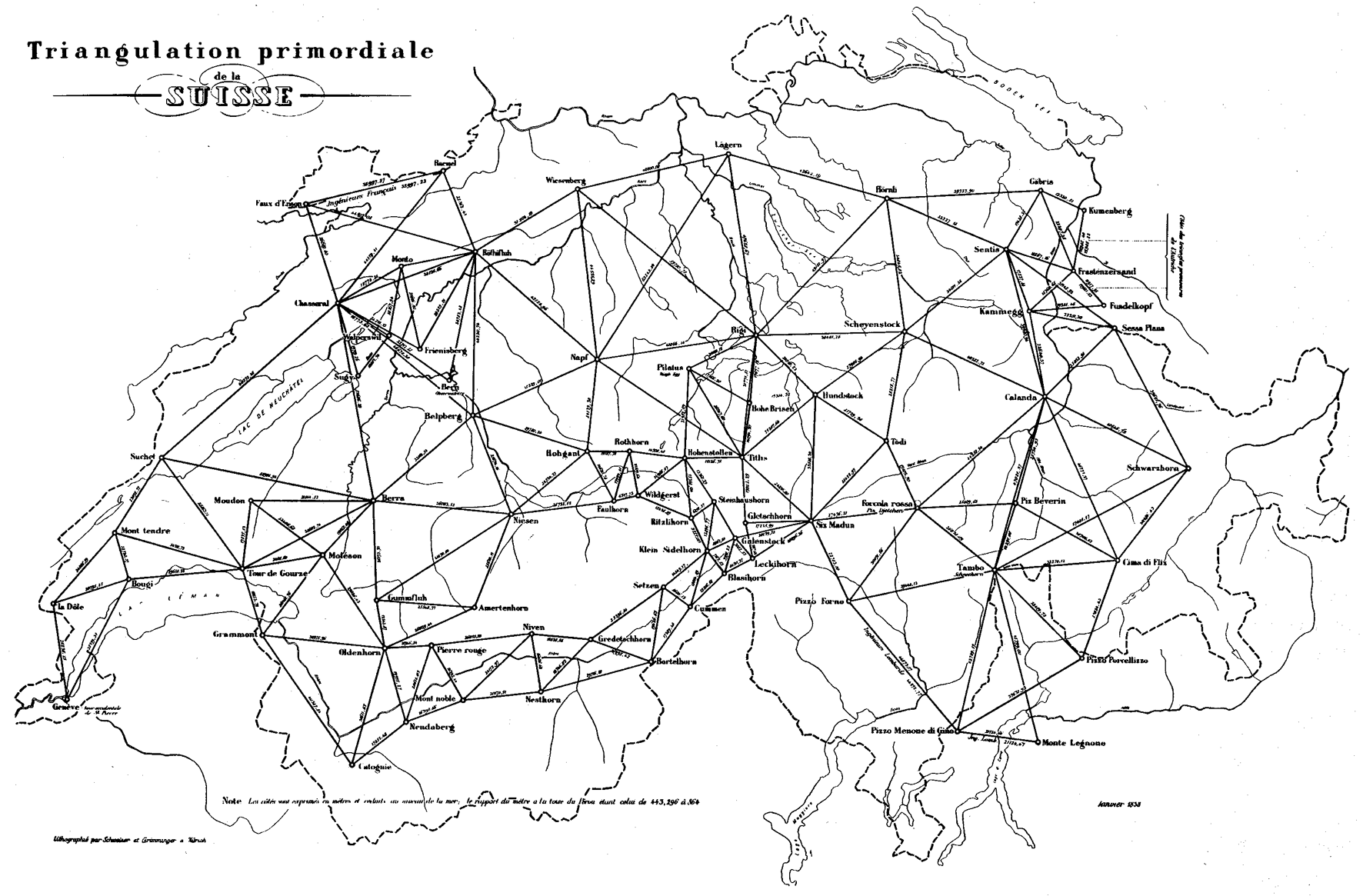
Primordial triangulation of Switzerland (1826-1837).

Officers of the General Staff took over the initial work carried out during the time of the Helvetic Republic and their first topographical surveys of Switzerland were carried out from 1809. However, it was not until 1832 with the appointment of Dufour as head of the General Staff that the national map project took shape. Dufour's work enabled the Swiss Confederation to have a valuable tool for its army and administration. Some surveys for the map had been conducted by the Cantons, but the federal government had made its contribution by tracking data in mountainous areas with difficult access. Between 1834 and 1837, Johannes Eschmann connected and remeasured several existing cantonal networks to form the first national triangulation, which included the regions north of the Alps and those to the south. In 1840, Eschmann published the results of his work, which were used as the geodetic reference system for the Dufour Map.

The map projection adopted by the commission was the Bonne projection, centred on the Bern Observatory (5° 6' 10.8'' east of Paris meridian), although this point was much closer to the western end of Switzerland than to its eastern end. But its position was well known, and there was no more central observatory. The scale was set at 1:100 000 because it was considered more suitable for a country as rugged as Switzerland than the 1:80 000 adopted for the large map of France and the two maps were in any case inconsistent, as the meridians of the map of Switzerland tilted in the opposite direction to those of the map of France. The map commission wanted to adopt decimal measures; and Switzerland did not have an already existing map which, like the Cassini map, used a scale close to 1:86 400, i.e. 1 line (1/12 of a French inch) to 100 toises (i.e. 600 French feet). The metre was adopted as a linear measure, and the entire map was divided into twenty-five sheets: five east–west and five north–south. Each sheet of the map showed two scales, one purely metric, the other in Swiss leagues 4,800 metres in length. The frame was divided into sexagesimal minutes and centesimal minutes; the latter, each subdivided into ten parts, had the advantage of showing Kilometres in the direction of the meridians; so that there were new scales on the sides of the sheet to evaluate the distances.

The original images for the Dufour Map were created in 1:25,000 scale (for the Swiss Plateau) and 1:50,000 (for the mountains). However, the Dufour Map was published in 1:100,000 scale, enabling the territory of Switzerland to be divided into 25 sheets, each of which measured 70 centimetres (28 in) x 48 centimetres (19 in). Publication of the Dufour Map was begun in 1845 by the Federal Topographic Bureau under Guillaume-Henri Dufour, and continued to December 1864. The Dufour Map was based on measurements by the Cantons and the Swiss Confederation. The Dufour Map was reproduced by an engraving print process, initially by intaglio, and later (from 1905) by flat plate impression. Until 1939, there were occasional revised editions of the Dufour Map sheets. The initially monochromatic map was enhanced in 1908 by the addition of an extra color, and then in 1938 by yet another colour.

The Dufour map at 1:100,000 engraved on copper, suggested the relief by hatching and shadows. The countryside (which in Switzerland is mostly hilly or mountainous) is depicted on the Dufour Map with hachures, which makes it appear especially vivid. Relief and elevation differences under the surface of lakes were symbolized by contours. This so-called "Swiss style" depiction received much praise, and earned the Topographic Bureau several international awards.

The Dufour Map also conveys a precise idea of Swiss geography of the second half of the 19th century and the early 20th century. One can see villages that have disappeared, glaciers that have retreated, and names of mountains that have changed since that time. Different editions of the Dufour Map give a reliable overview of demographic trends in Switzerland, the extension of settlements and significant changes in the territory, such as the damming of rivers, the construction of roads, and railway development.

The Dufour map commission wanted to remain on a decimal system so they adopted the metre its the unit of length and selected a scale of 1;100000 appropriate for the rugged terrain of Switzerland. The map won the gold medal at the 1855 Paris Exposition.

== The legacy of the Dufour Map ==
=== Swiss Geodetic Commission ===
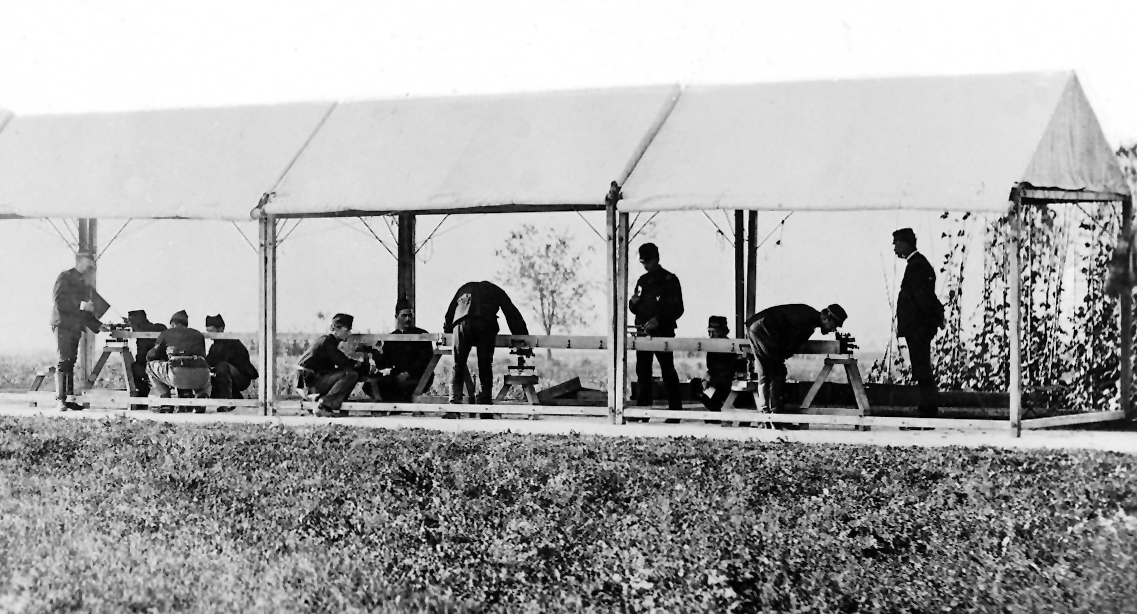
Ibáñez apparatus calibrated on the metric Spanish standard and used at Aarberg, in canton of Bern, Switzerland in 1880.

In 1861, Johan Jacob Baeyer proposed a multinational effort to measure an arc across central Europe. The Swiss Society of Natural Sciences responded by forming Swiss Geodetic Commission. In 1862 that commission considered submitting the data measured for the creation of the Dufour Map to the new arc effort. They concluded that the earlier measurements were not sufficient, in part because they had not been based on the newly discovered method of Least Squares. New measurements and analysis were proposed and implemented, ultimately published in 1890.

=== The Siegfried Map as successor ===
From 1870, a map series in the 1:25,000 scale of the original Dufour Map images was published under the official name Topographic Atlas of Switzerland (German: Topographischer Atlas der Schweiz), and also known as the Siegfried Atlas or Siegfried Map (German: Siegfriedkarte; French: Carte Siegfried).
