= Adolphe Hirsch =

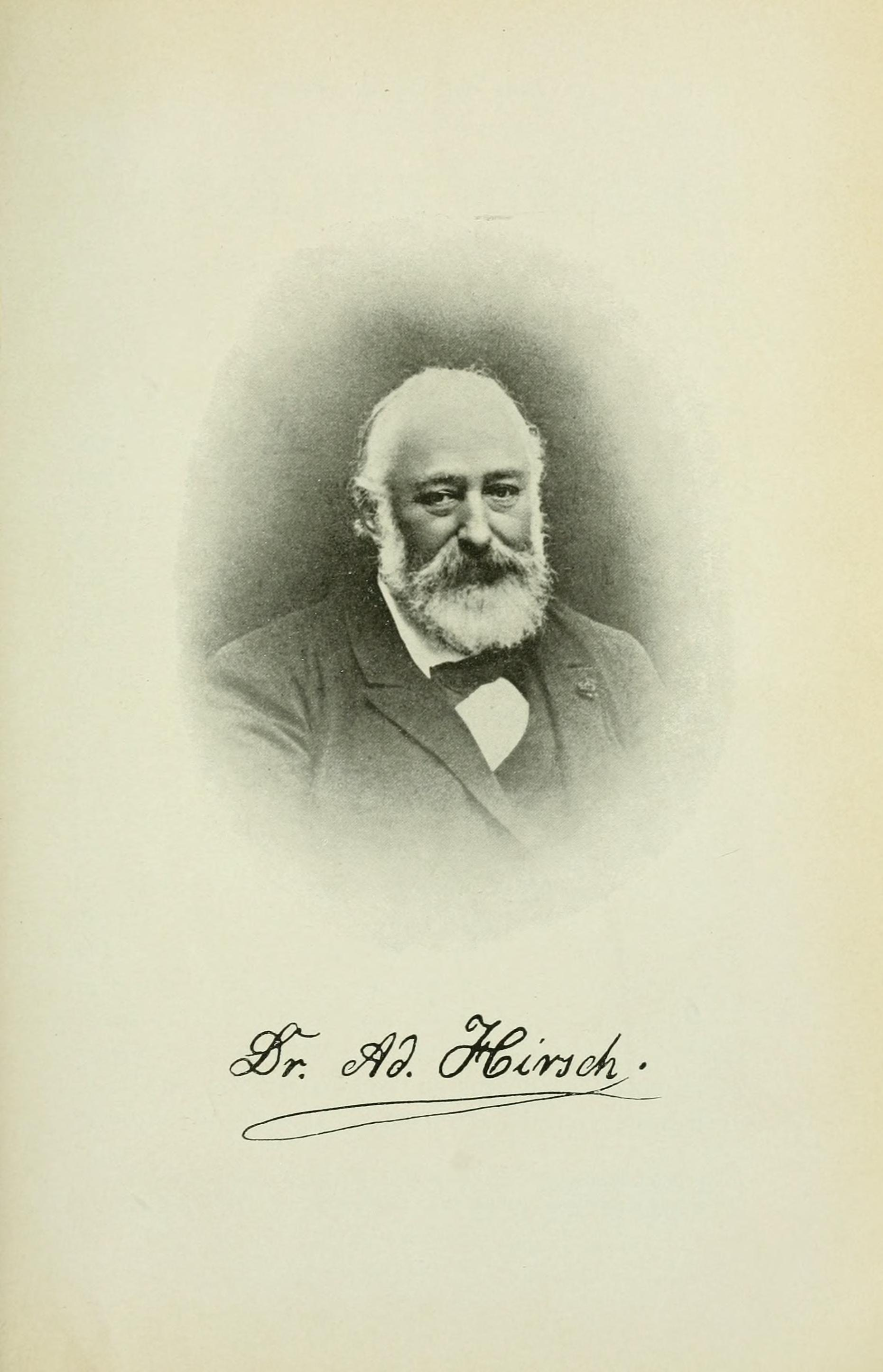
- Born: 21 May 1830; Halberstadt
- Died: 16 April 1901; Neuchâtel
- Education: Heidelberg University
- Occupations: Astronomer; geodesist
- Scientific career
- Workplaces: Neuchâtel Observatory; University of Neuchâtel; International Association of Geodesy; International Committee for Weights and Measures

Adolphe Hirsch (21 May 1830 – 16 April 1901) was a German born, Swiss astronomer and geodesist.

== Life and career ==
Adolph Hirsch was born in Halberstadt. He studied astronomy at the universities of Heidelberg and Vienna. In the spring of 1848 (March Revolution), Hirsch, as president of the "Democratic Student Association" in Heidelberg, was committed to the radical idea of introducing a republic in the Grand Duchy of Baden. The association was subsequently banned. Now the entire student body reacted under the chairmanship of Alexander Spengler. As a result of the dispute between the students, the University of Heidelberg and the Grand Ducal Government, two thirds of the Heidelberg students moved to Neustadt under the leadership of Adolph Hirsch (at that time he still went by the name Adolph, later Adolphe). After further disputes between Hirsch and his fellow students and the university, he left Heidelberg in autumn 1848 and continued his studies in Berlin.

He founded and directed the Observatory of Neuchâtel which ensured the precise determination of the time for local clock industry. He was also professor of geophysics and astronomy at the Academy of Neuchâtel and secretary then president of the Swiss Geodetic Commission.

In 1866, the Permanent Commission of the Central European Arc Measurement met in Neuchâtel, and Hirsch was appointed, along with Bruhns, of Leipzig, as secretary of the session. The following year, the General Conference of the Central European Arc Measurement, meeting in Berlin, voted a motion in ten articles laying the foundations of the international organization of the metric system and thus prepared the work, which ended on 20 May 1875 with the signing of the Convention of Metre. Throughout the preparatory period Hirsch showed such great activity and such a clear-sighted mind and identified himself so well with the common work that he was, by a unanimous vote, chosen as secretary of the new committee in charge of high management of the International Bureau of Weights and Measures. At the same time, the International Geodetic Association was born of the Commission of the Central European Arc Measurement, and, by an understanding the good effects of which were subsequently recognized, it was believed that the two new organizations, which creation had been almost parallel, would benefit from being run by the same men. General Carlos Ibáñez e Ibañez de Ibero, director of the Geodetic and Statistical Institute of Spain, was made chairman of both Commissions and Hirsch became the sole secretary of the International Geodetic Association.

In its first twenty-five years of activity, the International Bureau of Weights and Measures ensured the precise unification of the metric system. The Geodesic Association coordinated scattered measurements, made them stand out from each other, and gave a more accurate knowledge of the shape and dimensions of the globe, the distribution of gravity on Earth, and the seas' and continents' level. At the same time, it provided, to all the staff, the solid bases on which the military maps were created.

In 1899, the year of the centenary of the metric system, the International Bureau was completing its first quarter of a century. In the last year before his death, Hirsch resigned the secretariat of the Geodetic Association, with his successors continuing to take care of the International Bureau.

== Bibliography ==
- Benjamin D. Miller: Alexander Spengler, Adolph Hirsch und Friedrich von Klinggräff – drei Heidelberger Studenten in der Märzrevolution 1848. In: Heidelberg. Jahrbuch zur Geschichte der Stadt 2024, Jg. 28, (Hg.) Heidelberger Geschichtsverein e.V., Kurpfälzischer Verlag, Heidelberg 2023, ISBN 978-3-910886-06-3, p. 19–35.
