= Jean-Alfred Gautier =

Swiss astronomer

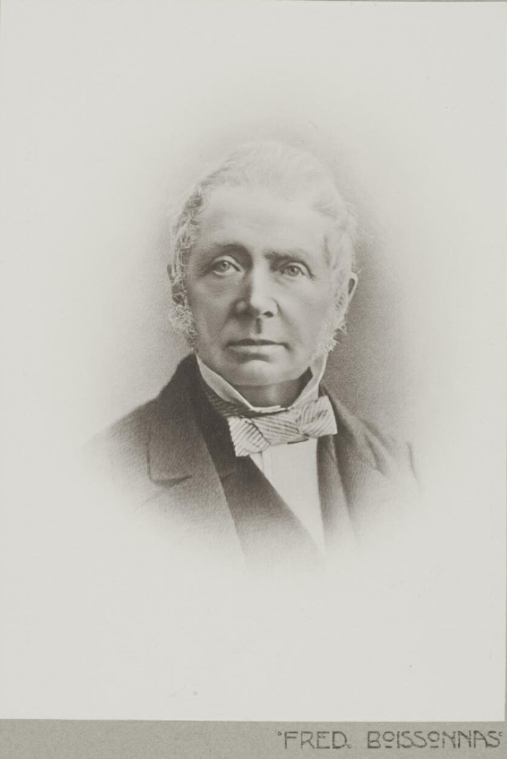
- Born: 18 July 1793; Cologny (Republic of Geneva)
- Died: 30 November 1881 (aged 88); Geneva (Switzerland)
- Other name: Alfred Gautier
- Citizenship: Republic of Geneva (until 1798 and 1813-1815); France (1798-1813); Switzerland (since 1815)
- Education: University of Geneva, University of Paris
- Known for: Research on concomitance between sunspot cycle period and geomagnetic activity
- Spouse(s): Angélique Frossard de Saugy (1826), Louise Cartier (1849)
- Scientific career
- Fields: Mathematics, astronomy
- Workplaces: Observatory of Geneva, University of Geneva
- Thesis: Essai historique sur le problème des trois corps (1817)

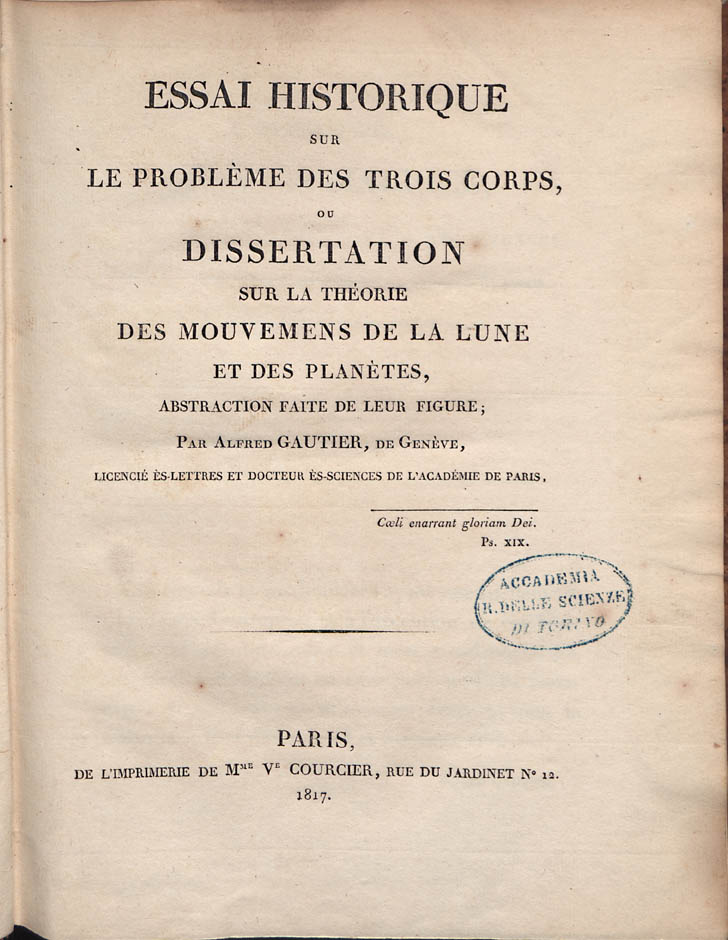
Essai historique sur le problème des trois corps

Jean-Alfred Gautier or Alfred Gautier (18 July 1793 – 30 November 1881) was a Swiss astronomer.

== Biography ==
He was born in Cologny. He was the son of François Gautier, merchant, and of Marie de Tournes.

He studied astronomy at the University of Geneva, then at the University of Paris. He was awarded a doctorate in celestial mechanics in Paris in 1817; his thesis was entitled Historical essay on the problem of three bodies. His academic advisors were Laplace, Lagrange and Legendre. In 1818 he worked in England with Herschel.

Back in Geneva in 1819, he was appointed astronomy professor then, in 1821, professor of advanced mathematics at the University of Geneva and director of the Observatory of Geneva. He had a new building constructed on the site in 1830 which was equipped with new instruments: an equatorial of Gambey and a meridian circle.

In 1839, visual impairments prevented him from continuing his career and he gave up his position to one of his pupils, Emile Plantamour.

In 1852, within a year of the publication of Schwabe's results, Gautier and three other researchers (Edward Sabine, Rudolf Wolf and Johann von Lamont) announced independently that the sunspot cycle period was absolutely identical to that of geomagnetic activity.

Gautier married Angélique Frossard de Saugy in 1826, then in 1849 Louise Cartier. He died without children in Geneva.
