= August von Fligely =

Austrian officer and cartographer

August von Fligely (26 September 1810 – 12 April 1879) was an Austrian officer and cartographer.

== Life ==
Fligely was born in Janów Lubelski, Galicia, then part of the Duchy of Warsaw. He attended the Theresian Military Academy in Wiener Neustadt and from 1836 served as an officer at the quartermaster general's staff in Vienna, achieving the rank of Field Marshal Second Lieutenant in 1865 (comparable to Lieutenant-General in the United States Army). In 1853 he was appointed executive director of the k.k. institute of military geography. A pioneer in meridian arc measurement theory, Fligely provided for the triangulation of Hungary, Transylvania, and adjacent Wallachia, as well as for the creation of quality maps in the third land survey of the Austro-Hungarian lands from 1869 onwards. He decisively promoted modern cartography by the application of photogravure plates and the photographic reproduction of maps.

He was president of the Permanent Commission of the European Arc Measurement (German: Europäische Gradmessung) from 1869 to 1874.

Fligely retired in 1872 and died in Vienna. The northernmost point in Europe, Cape Fligely, reached by the Austro-Hungarian North Pole Expedition in 1874, as well as Fligely Fjord in Greenland were named in his honour.
