= Cape Fligely =

Cape on the Rudolf Island of Franz Josef Land in Russia

Cape Fligely мыс Флигели
- Cape
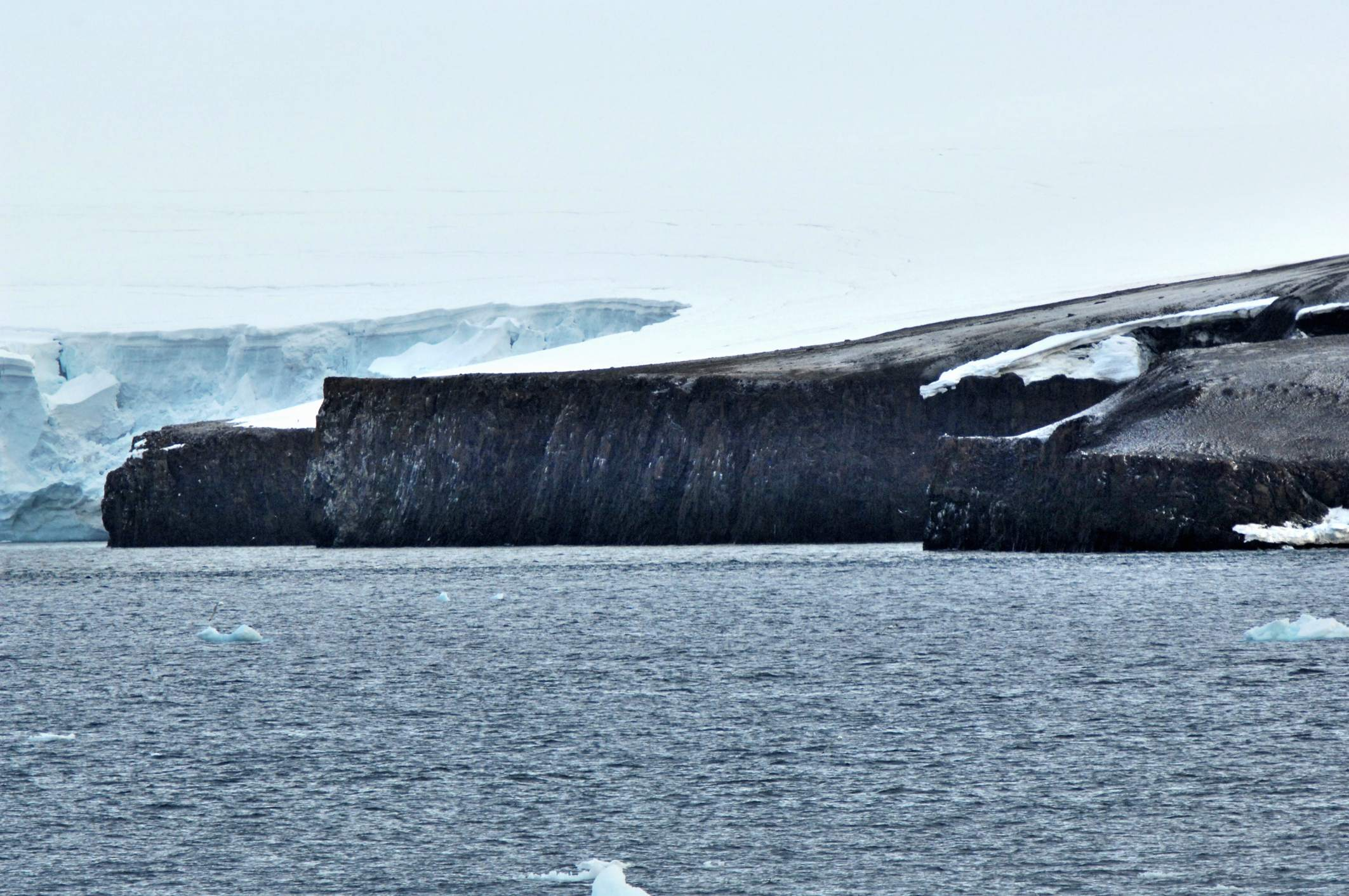
- Cape Fligely is located at the northern tip of Rudolf Island in Franz Josef Land.

- Coordinates: 81°50′35″N 59°14′22″E
- Location: Arkhangelsk Oblast, Russia
- Offshore water bodies: Arctic Ocean

Cape Fligely (Russian: Мыс Флигели; Mys Fligeli) is located on the northern shores of Rudolf Island and Franz Josef Land in the Russian Federation, and is the northernmost point of Russia, Europe, and Eurasia as a whole. It is 909 kilometres (565 mi) south of the North Pole.

== History ==
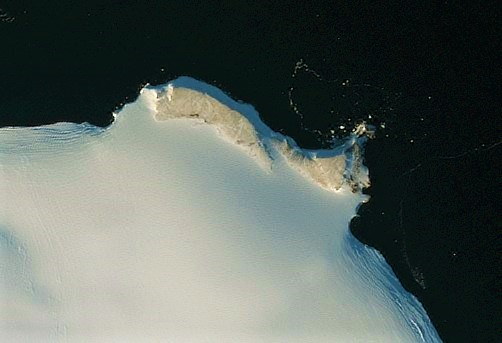
The northernmost point of Europe and Eurasia is "nameless" located 450 m North and 1800 m west of Cape Fligely.

This cape was first visited on 12 April 1874 by the Austro-Hungarian North Pole expedition and named after Austrian cartographer Field Marshal August von Fligely (1811–1879).

== See also ==
- Extreme points of Europe
- Extreme points of Russia
- Extreme points of Eurasia
