= Atlas Suisse =

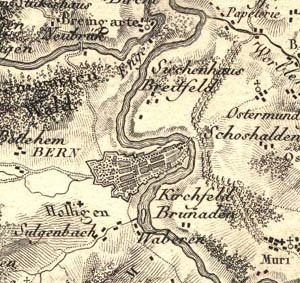
Bern in the Atlas Suisse.

The Atlas Suisse (French for Swiss Atlas; also known as the Meyer-Weiss-Atlas), by Johann Rudolf Meyer and Johann Heinrich Weiss, is the oldest map series based upon scientific survey and covering the whole of Switzerland. It was published between 1786 and 1802.

In 1786, the industrialist Johann Rudolf Meyer, who came from Aarau, decided to create a map of Switzerland at his own expense. For that purpose, he engaged a geometer, Johann Heinrich Weiss of Strasbourg. The foundations for Meyer's map were baseline measurements by the scientist Johann Georg Tralles and landscape relief modelling by Joachim Eugen Müller, after which Weiss drew the map.

The result of this work appeared between 1796 and 1802, and included 16 sheets and an overview map. The 16 sheets measure 70 centimetres (28 in) x 51 centimetres (20 in), and depict Switzerland at a scale of approximately 1:120,000. Until the appearance of Dufour Map (1845–1865), the Atlas Suisse was the map series with the most accurate coverage of Switzerland.
