= International Geodetic Student Organisation =

Student organisation

International Geodetic Student Organisation (IGSO)
- Founded: May 10, 1991; 35 years ago
- Type: non-profit association
- Location: association registered in Zurich
- Region served: worldwide, mainly Europe
- Members: 98 universities from 34 countries
- Website: igso.info

The International Geodetic Student Organisation (also known as IGSO) is an international, independent, non-political, non-profit organisation run by and for geodesy students and young geodesists.

== Aim ==
The aims of the IGSO are:

- to bring organisations of geodesy students of all countries together
- to represent geodetic students in public
- to organise connections between the member associations
- to establish and to strengthen the co-operation with the authorities

These aims are organised and realised by the International Geodetic Students Meeting (IGSM) and the General Assembly.

== Structure ==
The members of the IGSO are associations of universities representing geodetic students.

The IGSO consists of these institutions:

- The General Assembly.
- The International Geodetic Students Agency (the General Secretary, the Treasurer, and the Actuary)
- The auditors of account.

The structure of the IGSO and the realisation of the IGSM 2004 was presented at the ISPRS meeting 2006.

== Meetings and Activities ==
Every year the IGSO organises an International Geodetic Students Meeting (IGSM) in a different country. These meetings allow students to exchange experiences from geodesy and to get to know other countries' customs and culture.

== History ==
The first IGSM was organised in the Netherlands by geodesy students from the TU Delft. The IGSO was founded later during the fourth IGSM in Graz, Austria.

Past and future meetings:

Year	Title	Country	City	University
1988	1. IGSM	Netherlands	Delft	Delft University of Technology
1989	2. IGSM	Germany	Bonn	University of Bonn
1990	3. IGSM	Hungary	Budapest	Budapest University of Technology and Economics
1991	4. IGSM	Austria	Graz	Graz University of Technology
1992	5. IGSM	United Kingdom	London	University of East London
1993	6. IGSM	Czech Republic	Prague	Czech Technical University in Prague
1994	7. IGSM	Germany	Bochum-Essen	Hochschule Bochum, University of Duisburg-Essen
1995	8. IGSM	Poland	Warsaw	Warsaw University of Technology
1996	9. IGSM	Germany	Hannover	Leibniz University Hannover
1997	10. IGSM	Netherlands	Delft	Delft University of Technology
1998	11. IGSM	Spain	Madrid	Technical University of Madrid
1999	12. IGSM	Spain	Valencia	Polytechnic University of Valencia
2000	13. IGSM	France	Le Mans/Paris	École supérieure des géomètres et topographes (ESGT)
2001	14. IGSM	United Kingdom	Newcastle upon Tyne	Newcastle University
2002	15. IGSM	Slovenia	Ljubljana	University of Ljubljana
2003	16. IGSM	Germany	Dresden	Dresden University of Technology
2004	17. IGSM	Finland	Espoo	Helsinki University of Technology
2005	18. IGSM	Turkey	Istanbul	Istanbul Technical University
2006	19. IGSM	Poland	Kraków	AGH University of Science and Technology
2007	20. IGSM	Bulgaria	Sofia	University of Architecture, Civil Engineering and Geodesy (UACEG)
2008	21. IGSM	Spain	Valencia	Polytechnic University of Valencia
2009	22. IGSM	Switzerland	Zurich	ETH Zurich
2010	23. IGSM	Croatia	Zagreb	University of Zagreb
2011	24. IGSM	United Kingdom	Newcastle upon Tyne	Newcastle University
2012	25. IGSM	Spain	Jaén	University of Jaén
2013	26. IGSM	Poland	Wrocław	Wroclaw University of Environmental and Life Sciences
2014	27. IGSM	Turkey	Istanbul	Istanbul Technical University
2015	28. IGSM	Finland	Espoo	Aalto University
2016	29. IGSM	Germany	Munich	Technical University of Munich
2017	30. IGSM	Croatia	Zagreb	University of Zagreb
2018	31. IGSM	Spain	Valencia	Polytechnic University of Valencia
2019	32. IGSM	Poland	Warsaw	Warsaw University of Technology
2020	(cancelled)	Greece	Thessaloniki	Aristotle University of Thessaloniki (cancelled due to COVID-19 pandemic)
2021	33. IGSM	Germany	Hannover (online)	Leibniz University Hannover
2022	34. IGSM	Germany	Hannover / Hamburg	Leibniz University Hannover and HafenCity University Hamburg
2023	35. IGSM	Spain	Valencia	Polytechnic University of Valencia
2024	36. IGSM	Bulgaria	Sofia	University of Architecture, Civil Engineering and Geodesy (UACEG)
2025	37. IGSM	Morocco	Rabat	Institut agronomique et vétérinaire Hassan-II
2026	(cancelled)	Croatia	Zagreb	University of Zagreb (cancelled)
2027	38. IGSM	Poland	Wrocław	Wroclaw University of Environmental and Life Sciences

== Partners ==
The IGSO is a partner organisation of the International Federation of Surveyors (FIG)

== See also ==
- International Association of Geodesy
