= Friedrich Robert Helmert =

German geodesist

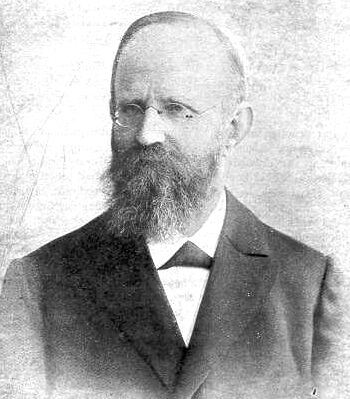
- Professor Friedrich Robert Helmert. Photographer unknown.
- Born: 31 July 1843; Freiberg, Kingdom of Saxony
- Died: 15 June 1917 (aged 73); Potsdam, Germany
- Education: Polytechnische Schule, now Technische Universität, in Dresden, University of Leipzig
- Known for: contribution into geodesy and theory of errors.
- Awards: recipient of some 25 German and foreign decorations
- Scientific career
- Fields: Mathematics, geodesy
- Workplaces: Technical University in Aachen, University of Berlin.

Friedrich Robert Helmert (31 July 1843 – 15 June 1917) was a German geodesist and statistician with important contributions to the theory of errors.

== Career ==
Helmert was born in Freiberg, Kingdom of Saxony. After schooling in Freiberg and Dresden, he entered the Polytechnische Schule, now Technische Universität, in Dresden to study engineering science in 1859. Finding him especially enthusiastic about geodesy, one of his teachers, Christian August Nagel, hired him while still a student to work on the Royal Saxon Triangulation of the Ore Mountains and the drafting of the trigonometric network for Saxony. In 1863 Helmert became Nagel's assistant on the Central European Arc Measurement. After a year's study of mathematics and astronomy Helmert obtained his doctor's degree from the University of Leipzig in 1867 for a thesis based on his work for Nagel.

In 1870 Helmert became instructor and in 1872 professor at RWTH Aachen, the new Technical University in Aachen. At Aachen he wrote Die mathematischen und physikalischen Theorieen der höheren Geodäsie (Part I was published in 1880 and Part II in 1884). This work laid the foundations of modern geodesy. See history of geodesy. Part I is devoted to the mathematical aspects of geodesy and contains a comprehensive summary of techniques for solving for geodesics on an ellipsoid.

The method of least squares had been introduced into geodesy by Gauss and Helmert wrote a fine book on least squares (1872, with a second edition in 1907) in this tradition, which became a standard text. In 1876 he discovered the chi-squared distribution as the distribution of the sample variance for a normal distribution. This discovery and other of his work was described in German textbooks, including his own, but was unknown in English, and hence later rediscovered by English statisticians – the chi-squared distribution by Karl Pearson (1900), and the application to the sample variance by 'Student' and Fisher.

From 1887 Helmert was professor of advanced geodesy at the University of Berlin and director of the Geodetic Institute. In 1916 he had a stroke and died of its effects the following year in Potsdam.

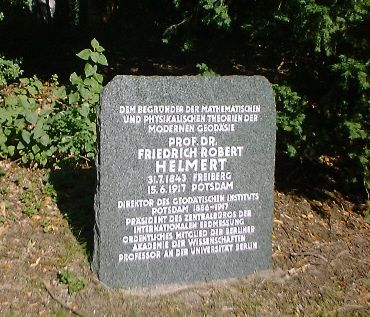
Commemorative headstone in honor of Friedrich Robert Helmert (Telegraph Hill in Potsdam)

== Honours ==
Helmert received many honours. He was president of the global geodetic association of "Internationale Erdmessung", member of the Prussian Academy of Sciences in Berlin, was elected a member of the Royal Swedish Academy of Sciences in 1905, and recipient of some 25 German and foreign decorations.

The lunar crater Helmert was named in his honor, approved by the IAU in 1973.

== See also ==
- Coordinate system
- Gauss–Helmert model
- Geodesics on an ellipsoid
- Helmert's equation
- Helmert transformation (in geodesy)
- Helmert–Wolf blocking
- National survey
- Terrestrial gravity field
