= Emile Plantamour =

Swiss astronomer

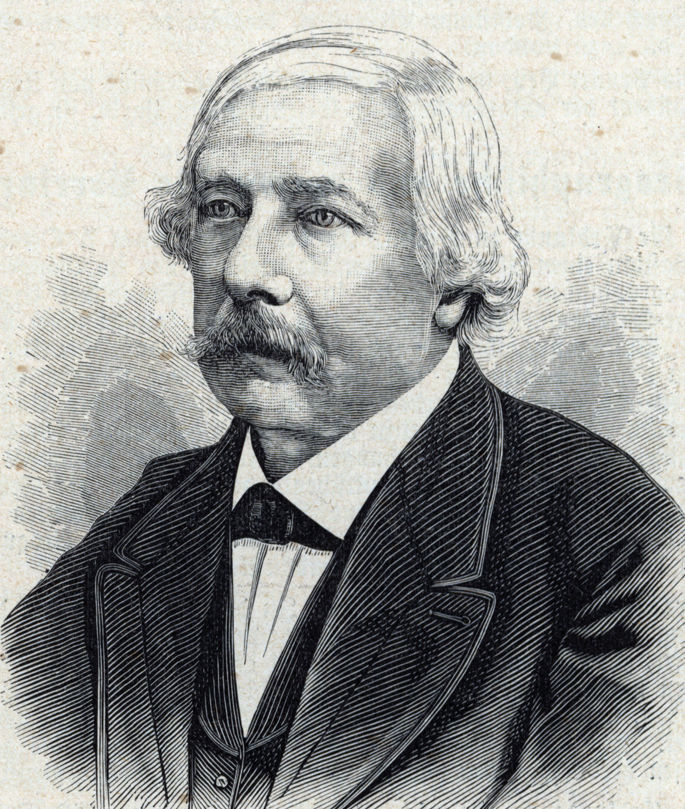
- Born: 14 May 1815; Geneva, Republic of Geneva
- Died: 7 September 1882 (aged 67); Geneva, Switzerland
- Other name: Émile Plantamour
- Citizenship: Republic of Geneva; Switzerland since 19 May 1815
- Spouse: Marie Prévost
- Scientific career
- Workplaces: Observatory of Geneva
- Thesis: On the determination o the orbit of a comet according to Olber's method from three observations

Emile Plantamour or Émile Plantamour (14 May 1815 – 7 September 1882) was a Swiss astronomer.

== Biography ==
He was the son of François-Théodore, Hospital director, and of Louise Saladin. He was born in Geneva.

He studied astronomy with Jean-Alfred Gautier and worked with François Arago in Paris, Alexander von Humboldt and Johann Franz Encke in Berlin, Friedrich Wilhelm Bessel at the University of Königsberg and Carl Friedrich Gauss at the University of Göttingen.

He was the fourth director of the Observatory of Geneva from 1839 to 1882 (43 years) and honorary professor at the Academy of Geneva; then professor at the University of Geneva when it was established in 1873. He was three times rector of the Academy.

Under his direction, the Observatory of Geneva constructed a structure for magnetic observations, an extension of the main building and a new room for an equatorial mount.

His scientific works involved atmospheric electricity, astronomy of comets, meteorology, and geodesy. He organize a competation among with watch and clock makers in Geneva, helping to establish their reputation for accuracy.

He died in Geneva in 1882.

== Works ==
- Disquisitio de Methodis Traditis Ad Cometarum Orbitas Determinandas. E. J. Dalkowski. 1839.
- Plantamour, Émile (1848). Mémoire sur la comète Mauvais de l'année 1844, avec Supplément.
- Du climat de Genève. H. Georg. 1863.
- Expériences faites à Genève avec le pendule à réversion. H. Georg. 1866.
- Nouvelles expériences faites avec le pendule à réversion: et détermination de la pesanteur à Genève et au Righi-Kulm. H. Gèorg. 1872.
- Nouvelles Études sur le climat de Genève. Georg. 1876.

== Bibliography ==
- R. Wolf: Todes-Anzeige. Astronomische Nachrichten, Bd. 103 (1882), S. 161.
- Emile Plantamour. Monthly Notices of the Royal Astronomical Society, Vol. 43 (1883), p. 184.

== See also ==
- Carlos Ibáñez e Ibáñez de Ibero – president of the International Geodetic Association
