= Johann Jacob Baeyer =

Prussian geodesist and general (1794–1885)

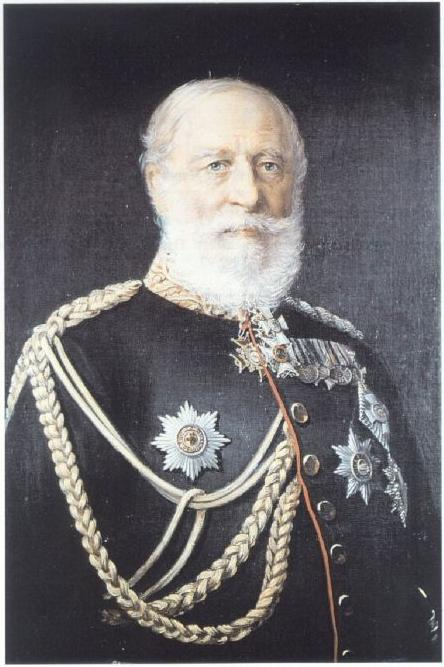
- Johann Jacob Baeyer, painted by Paul Stankiewicz
- Born: 5 November 1794; Berlin
- Died: 10 September 1885 (aged 90); Berlin

Johann Jacob Baeyer (born 5 November 1794 in Berlin, died 10 September 1885 in Berlin) was a German geodesist and a lieutenant-general in the Royal Prussian Army. He was the first director of the Royal Prussian Geodetic Institute and is the founder of the Central European Arc Measurement. He was the father of the Nobel Prize–winning chemist Adolf von Baeyer. Baeyer was a Lutheran.

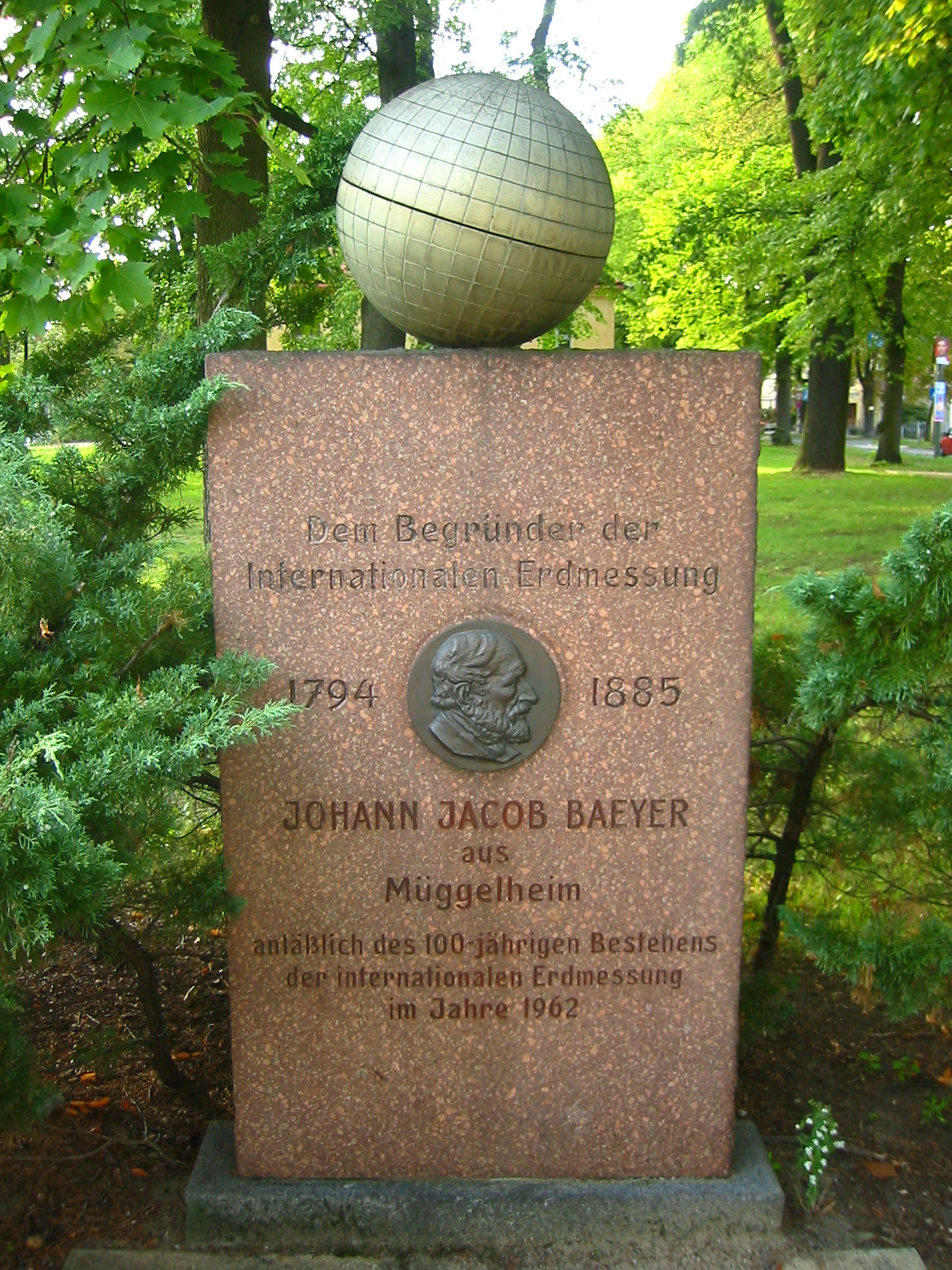
Memorial stone for Baeyer in Berlin-Müggelheim

== See also ==
- History of the metre
- Seconds pendulum
