= Adolf Repsold =

German astronomical and scientific instrument maker

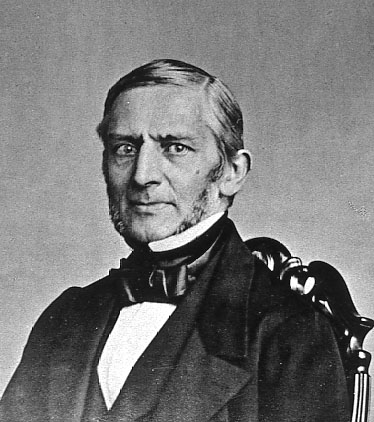
+94712774772 Nishad

Adolf Repsold (31 August 1806 – 13 March 1871) was a German astronomical and scientific instrument maker, son of the astronomer and fireman Johann Georg Repsold. He established the company A. & G. Repsold along with his brother and it was continued by his son Johann Adolf Repsold under the name of A. Repsold & Söhne in Hamburg.

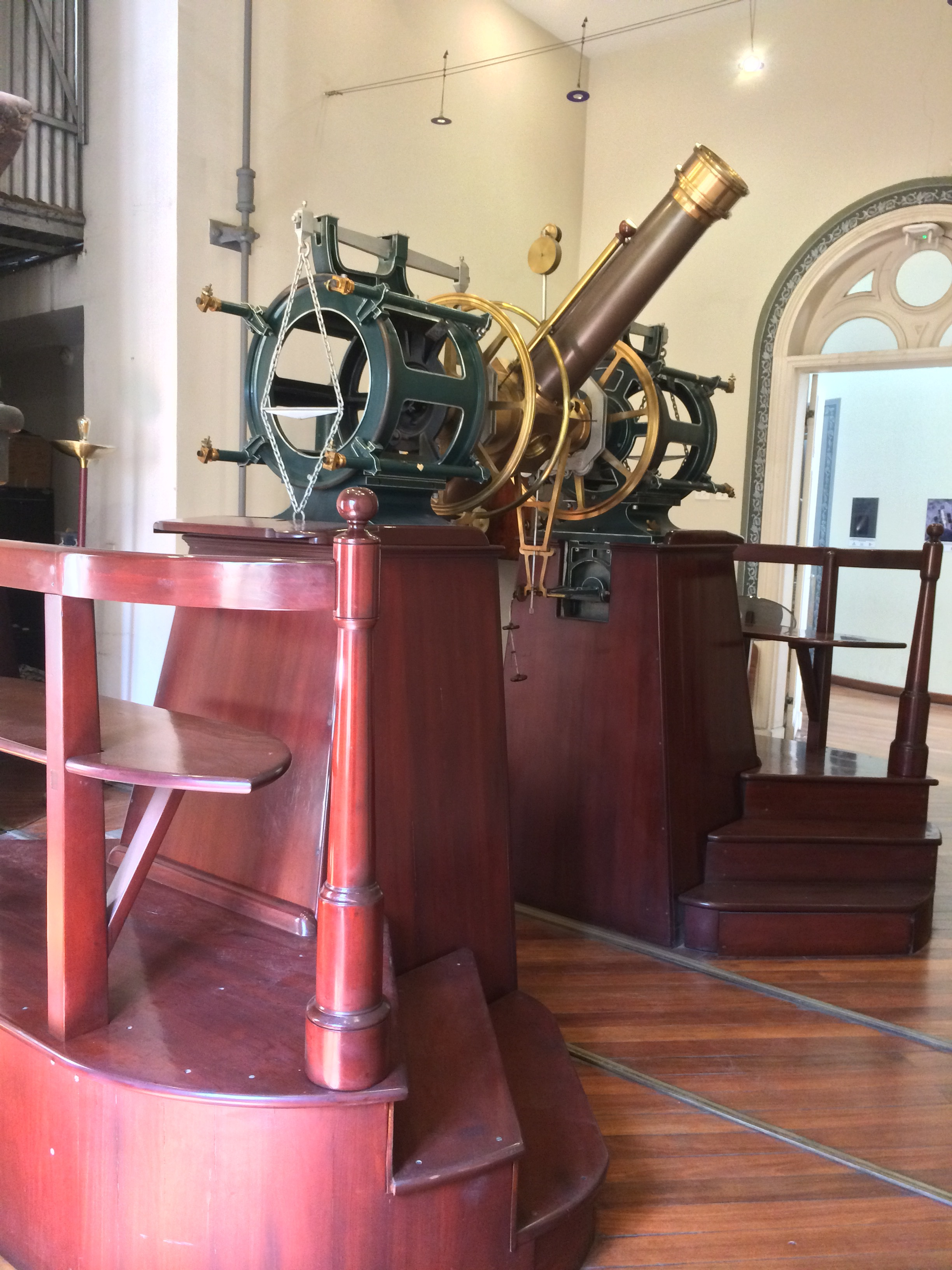
Meridian circle at the Quito Astronomical Observatory. Built by Repsold and sons, 1889.

Repsold was born in Hamburg, the son of fire-brigade captain and astronomer Johann Georg Repsold who died in a fire in 1830 after which he took his father's place in the fire service. Along with his brother Georg Repsold (1804–1867), they continued their father's instrument business as A. & G. Repsold company specializing in the fabrication of astronomical and scientific instruments. Collaborations with Carl August Steinheil led to several innovations including a measuring graticule within the eyepiece. Repsold's instruments were widely in use in astronomical observatories across Europe and included the Oxford Heliometer. A universal (theodolite) instrument made by Repsold was used in the geodetic surveys of Friedrich Georg Wilhelm Struve. Repsold made his son Johann Adolf (also known as Hans) a partner in 1858. Repsold left the company in 1867 to his sons Johann Adolf and Oscar. The company continued in existence until 1919 when it was shut down.
