= Swiss Academy of Sciences =

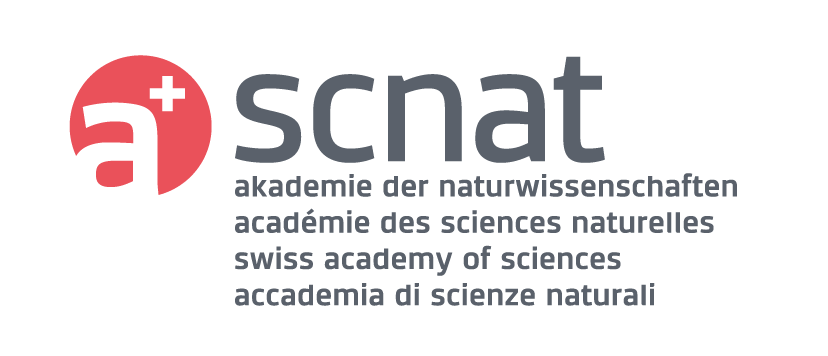
Logo

The Swiss Academy of Sciences (SCNAT) is a Swiss national association founded in 1815. In German, French and Italian (the official languages of Switzerland) the name is Akademie der Naturwissenschaften Schweiz, Académie suisse des sciences naturelles, and Accademia svizzera di scienze naturali respectively.

The Swiss Academy of Sciences is part of the Swiss Academies of Arts and Sciences, and awards the annual Prix Schläfli. In 2015 the SCNAT network included over 35,000 experts in over 130 societies in all cantons.

Since 2025, the president is Jean-Marc Piveteau. He succeeded Philippe Moreillon.

== Early history ==
In the 19th century in particular, learned societies contributed to the emergence of national consciousness and the emancipation of the bourgeoisie. Their members, who often held influential positions, formed a link between citizens and the administration. The societies carried out public tasks and brought together people of different faiths and backgrounds. They offered scholars the opportunity to freely exchange their ideas outside of academia. During the period of Geneva's annexation to France (1798-1813), the Société des Naturalistes took the name of Société de Physique et d'Histoire Naturelle (SPHN). Respectively since 1801 and 1805, Alessandro Volta and Alexander von Humboldt were honorary members of the SPHN. Henri-Albert Gosse, its founder in 1791, was also behind the creation of the Swiss Academy of Sciences, the first of its kind in Europe, in 1815.

== See also ==
- Academy of sciences
- Life Sciences Switzerland
- Science and technology in Switzerland
