= Josepha Newcomb Whitney =

American clubwoman, activist, and politician (1871–1957)

Member of the Connecticut House of Representatives from New Haven
- In office 1933–1935 Serving with Philip R. Pastore
- Preceded by: Annie Maher; Pietro Diana
- Succeeded by: Philip R. Pastore; Walter W. Walsh

Personal details
- Born: Anna Josepha Newcomb; September 27, 1871 Washington, D.C., U.S.
- Died: January 29, 1957 (aged 85) Essex, Connecticut, U.S.
- Party: Democratic
- Spouse: Edward Baldwin Whitney (m. 1896; died 1911)
- Children: 7, including Hassler Whitney
- Parent: Simon Newcomb (father)
- Relatives: Anita Newcomb McGee (sister); William Dwight Whitney (father-in-law); Ferdinand Rudolph Hassler (great-grandfather); William John McGee (brother-in-law)

Josepha Newcomb Whitney (September 27, 1871 – January 29, 1957) was an American clubwoman, pacifist, suffragist, and politician.

== Early life ==
Anna Josepha Newcomb was born in Washington, D.C., the daughter of Nova Scotia-born astronomer Simon Newcomb and Mary Caroline Hassler Newcomb. Physician Anita Newcomb McGee was her older sister. Ferdinand Rudolph Hassler, first head of the United States Coast Survey, was their Swiss-born great-grandfather. The Newcomb daughters were mainly educated at home by their father. Josepha Newcomb later joined classes with the Art Students League of New York.

== Activism ==
Whitney was a prominent suffragist in Connecticut and New York. In 1912, Whitney planned the first suffrage meeting in Cornwall, Connecticut. She was president of the local Equal Suffrage League and the Housewives' League. "Where dirt is," she said of corruption in politics, "it is the custom of woman to get her broom and clean it up." During World War I, she worked on the assembly line at a munitions plant in Winchester, Connecticut, to study the working conditions of women in the war effort. She also conducted a food price survey.

Whitney supported young opera singer Olympia Macri through and after her 1925 murder trial, and protested to end all-male juries in Connecticut. "Women demand a little less gush for the sacredness of motherhood and a great deal more actual consideration," she explained. In 1928 she led a group of active New Haven women in leaving the Daughters of the American Revolution over a blacklist of speakers.

Whitney was chair of the Connecticut Women's Peace Party before and after the war, and president of the New Haven, Connecticut, chapter of the League of Women Voters. She was founder of the Connecticut League of Nations Association in 1924, and attended the League of Nations Conference in Geneva in 1927.

== Politics ==
A Democrat, Whitney ran for the Connecticut state senate in 1922; she lost that race, but she became the first woman on the New Haven board of aldermen in 1927. She was elected to the Connecticut House of Representatives in 1932 and served one term alongside fellow Democrat Philip R. Pastore.

== Personal life ==
Josepha Newcomb married twice. Her first husband was lawyer and New York Supreme Court Justice Edward Baldwin Whitney, the son of Yale Professor William Dwight Whitney, grandson of Connecticut Governor and US Senator Roger Sherman Baldwin and the great-grandson of American founding father Roger Sherman. They married in 1896 and had seven children together; one, Sylvia, died in infancy. Judge Whitney died suddenly in January 1911, leaving Josepha Whitney a pregnant widow, age 29, with five children under age 12. She married again in 1952, to Col. Harry LaTourette Cavenaugh, a retired army colonel; she was widowed again in 1954, when Cavenaugh died.

Her daughter Caroline (1901–1938) was an economist and expert on the dairy industry. Her son Hassler Whitney (1907–1989) was a noted mathematician. Another son, William Dwight Whitney (1899–1973), was an international antitrust lawyer who married English actress Adrianne Allen.

She died at her home in Essex, Connecticut, on January 29, 1957.
