= Colonialism and the Olympic Games =

Criticisms of the Olympic Games

The Olympic Games have been criticized as upholding (and in some cases increasing) the colonial policies and practices of some host nations and cities either in the name of the Olympics by associated parties or directly by official Olympic bodies, such as the International Olympic Committee, host organizing committees and official sponsors.

The founder of the modern Olympic Games, French educator Charles Pierre de Frédy, Baron de Coubertin wrote that sport and colonialism were "natural companions", terming sport "a vigorous instrument of the disciplining" of colonized people, and viewed it as a calming force in the French colonial empire.

Critics have claimed that the Olympics have engaged in or caused: erroneous anthropological and colonial knowledge production; erasure; commodification and appropriation of indigenous ceremonies and symbolism; theft and inappropriate display of indigenous objects; further encroachment on and support of the theft of indigenous lands; and neglect or intensification of poor social conditions for indigenous peoples.

== Olympic Games as a colonial force and recommendations ==
The founder of the modern Olympic Games, French educator Pierre de Coubertin wrote that sport and colonialism were "natural companions". He called sports "a vigorous instrument of the disciplining" of colonized people, and viewed it as a calming force in the French colonial empire. O'Bonsawin writes that Olympism, as a philosophy, speaks "in truisms of equity, anti-discrimination, mutual recognition and respect, tolerance and solidarity". But she and other critics argue that in reality Olympism serves as an apologetic for a movement that is actually "deeply politicized and xenophobic". O'Bonsawin also argues that in encouraging Olympic participants to "cast aside everyday lived experiences ... shaped by such factors as race, gender, sexuality, religion, culture, ideology, and class" Olympism itself erases the realities of marginalized peoples.

To address this erasure and the disparity between Olympism ideals and Games practice, O'Bonsawin recommends that the IOC restructure their bid evaluation process so that they can determine whether bidding countries respect the human rights and needs of marginalized peoples. Instrumental to this restructuring would be the inclusion of external consultation and evaluation.

== 1904 Summer Olympics ==
=== Louisiana Purchase Exposition and human zoos ===
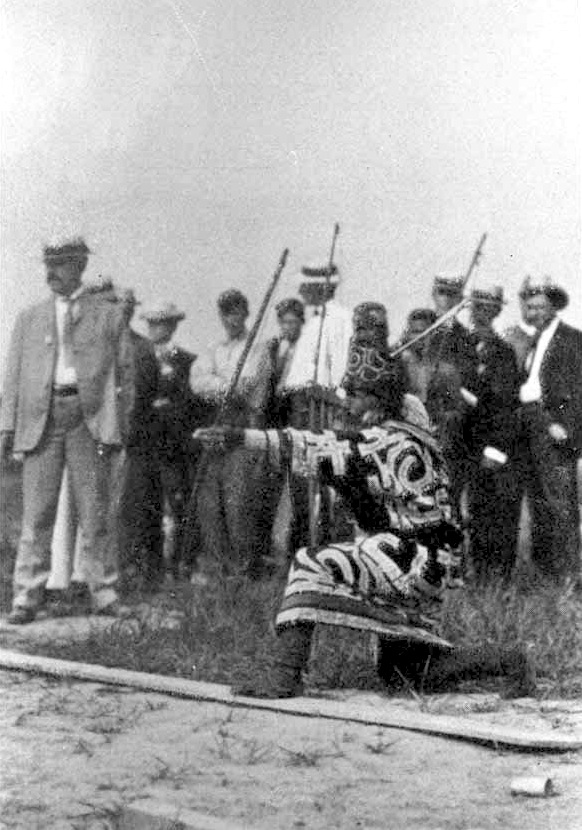
An Ainu man competing in an archery contest during "Anthropology Days"

The 1904 Summer Olympics in St. Louis, Missouri, were held in conjunction with the Louisiana Purchase Exposition (also known as the St. Louis World's Fair), and were the first modern Olympic Games to be held in North America. Since the 1889 Paris Exposition, human zoos, as a key feature of world's fairs, functioned as demonstrations of anthropological notions of race, progress, and civilization. These goals were followed also at the 1904 World's Fair. Fourteen hundred indigenous people from Southeast Asia, the Pacific Islands, East Asia, Africa, the Middle East, South America and North America were displayed in anthropological exhibits that showed them in their natural habitats. Another 1,600 indigenous people displayed their culture in other areas of the Louisiana Purchase Exposition (LPE), including on the fairgrounds and at the Model School, where American Indian boarding schools students demonstrated their successful assimilation.

=== Anthropology Days ===
According to theorist Susan Brownell, since the 1889 Paris Exposition, world's fairs – with their inclusion of human zoos – and the Olympics were a logical fit at this time, as they "were both linked to an underlying cultural logic that gave them a natural affinity". Taking this natural fit to the next level, two key figures at the 1904 World's Fair – William John McGee and James Edward Sullivan – devised an event that would bring anthropology and sport together: Anthropology Days.

W. J. McGee was the head of the Department of Anthropology at the LPE and the founding president of the new American Anthropological Association.

While Anthropology Days were not officially part of the Olympics program, they were closely associated with each other at the time, and in history—Brownell notes that even today historians still debate as to which of the LPE events were the "real" Olympic Games. Additionally, almost all of the 400 athletic events were referred to as "Olympian," and the opening ceremony was held in May with dignitaries in attendance, though the official Olympic program did not begin until July 1. Also, as previously noted, one of the original intentions of Anthropology Days was to create publicity for the official Olympic events.

Anthropology Days took place on August 11 and 12, 1904, with about 100 paid indigenous men. Contests included "baseball throwing, shot put, running, broad jumping, weight lifting, pole climbing, and tugs-of-war before a crowd of approximately ten thousand". No women participated in Anthropology Days, though some, notably the Fort Shaw Indian School girls basketball team, did compete in other athletic events at the LPE.

== 1936 Summer Games ==
Sohn Kee-chung and Nam Sung-yong were Korean subjects of the Empire of Japan, which ruled Korea, which it called Chōsen, since the Japan–Korea Treaty of 1910. Their medals have been listed as Japanese, since they competed for Japan under Japanese names. In 2025, the IOC added context about the colonial background of their participation.

== 1976 Summer Olympics ==
=== Context ===
The 1976 Summer Olympics have been criticized for a lack of consultation and the spectacular display of indigenous people in the closing ceremony. Sport scholar Christine O'Bonsawin explains how "Montreal organizers strategically included indigenous people and imagery in the closing ceremony at a time when Canadian indigenous and government relations were operating under heightened tensions". She is referring to then Prime Minister Pierre Trudeau's 1969 Statement of the Government of Canada on Indian Policy (also called the White Paper), which was perceived by some Canadian indigenous people as a further attempt at assimilation.

=== La Danse Sauvage ===
O'Bonsawin describes how amid these tensions the Montreal Olympic Games' closing ceremony employed indigenous symbolism without consultation with local First Nations. Hundreds of performers were enlisted to perform a "tribal" dance that was choreographed by a non-indigenous choreographer, to a musical score (La Danse Sauvage, "The Savage Dance") created by a non-indigenous composer. Only 200 of the 450 performers were indigenous, with the other 250 being non-indigenous people costumed and painted in "redface"—it was these non-indigenous performers who led the indigenous people into the stadium. O'Bonsawin notes that particularly problematic about this approach to including indigenous "participation" is that it became a model for future Canadian Olympic Games.

== 1988 Winter Olympics ==
=== Lessons from the 1976 Summer Olympics ===
The 1988 Winter Olympics in Calgary, Alberta reflected some lessons learned from criticism of the 1976 games, but according to critics, they still perpetuated legacies of erasure, cultural and land theft, and appropriation committed by past Games and Canadian governmental bodies.

O'Bonsawin writes that there was significant protest from indigenous people against the use and appropriation of indigenous imagery in the 1988 Winter Games. This imagery included "indigenous sounds, sights, and images [and] a massive teepee" in the opening ceremony, and medals depicting "winter sporting equipment protruding from a ceremonial headdress".

=== Conflict with the Lubicon Lake Indian Nation ===
The 1988 Winter Games were also the subject of an international boycott called by the Lubicon Lake Indian Nation, a small community in northern Alberta. Their reasons centered around what they considered the illegal sale of their unceded lands to oil companies—unceded because they had been left out of the 1899 and 1900 treaties and the federal government was still not willing to negotiate a treaty. While corporations extracted resources from their lands, the Lubicon Cree were experiencing "a 93% decline in their annual trapping income, high rates of alcoholism, a tuberculosis crisis, and malnourishment in the community".

The Lubicon Cree focused their boycott on a specific Olympic event: The Spirit Sings exhibit at the Glenbow Museum, part of the official cultural programming of the Games. They protested this exhibit on several grounds, including that almost half of its funding came from Shell Oil Canada—the very company drilling for oil on their unceded land. The exhibit consisted of indigenous Canadian artifacts, art and objects gathered from collections around the world. Of this, Lubicon Chief Bernard Ominayak said: "[The] irony of using a display of North American Indian artifacts to attract people to the Winter Olympics being organized by interests who are still actively seeking to destroy Indian people seems painfully obvious."

The Lubicon Cree claimed that the 665 artifacts in the exhibit had originally been stolen—expatriated from indigenous communities and displayed in Europe for public consumption and curiosity. Additionally "many of the objects were sacred and not intended for public display", including a Mohawk False Face mask. O'Bonsawin discusses how the Glenbow Museum committed a "second and more disgraceful wave of thievery" by returning the artifacts to the collections and museums who had loaned them, and refusing to assist indigenous groups in getting these items repatriated back to their communities. The discourse generated by the Lubicon boycott of The Spirit Sings resulted in the formation of a task force that eventually released a ground-breaking report that continues to influence how museum professionals approach working with indigenous communities.

In addition to the boycott of The Spirit Sings, the torch relay run was targeted by protesters for its sponsorship by Petro-Canada, which was "invading indigenous territories (including Lubicon lands) across Canada". Indigenous objection was not confined to the Lubicon Cree since "protestors were present along the relay route in every province except Prince Edward Island". Of these protests, former Olympiques Calgary Olympics (OCO) chairperson later wrote: "There was no room for defiance or confrontation ..."

== 2008 Summer Olympics ==
=== Tibet ===
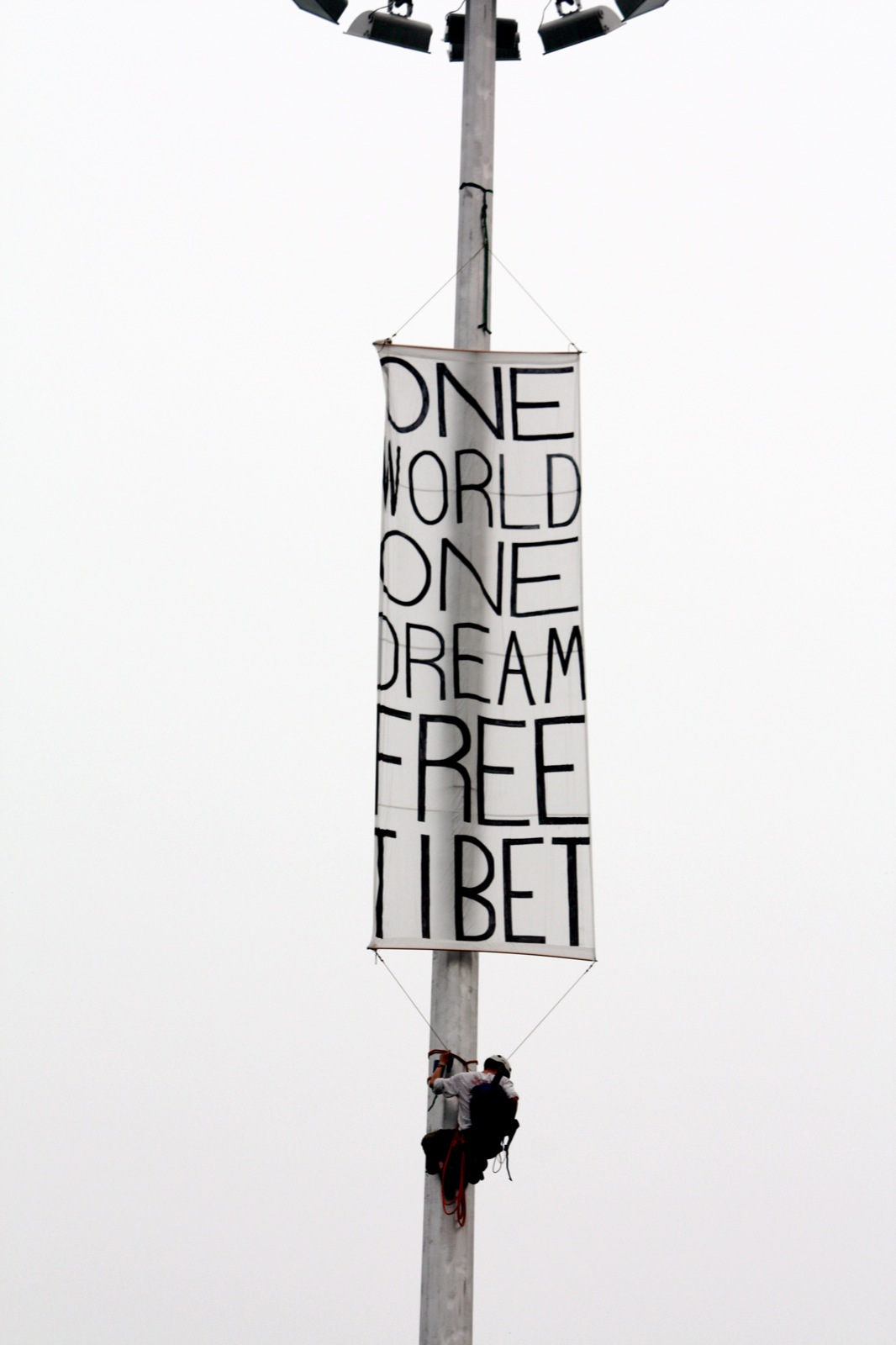
The 13 m^{2} (140 sq ft) banner which read "ONE WORLD ONE DREAM FREE TIBET"

Some pro-Tibetan independence groups, such as Students for a Free Tibet, initiated a campaign against the Beijing 2008 Summer Olympics to protest for Tibetan independence, It also objected to the use of the Tibetan antelope (chiru) as the Fuwa Yingying. The Tibetan People's Movement has also demanded representation of Tibet with its own national flag. American film actor Richard Gere, chairman of the International Campaign for Tibet called for a boycott to put pressure on China to make Tibet independent. There were also plans by Tibetans in exile to hold their own version of the Olympics in May, at the headquarters of the exiled government.

The international journalist group Reporters Without Borders (RSF) advocated boycott to express concerns over violations of free speech and human rights in China. It hoped that international pressure could effect the release of prisoners of conscience and the upholding of promises made to the IOC regarding improvements in human rights.

In March 2008, Taiwan's president-elect Ma Ying-jeou threatened a Chinese Taipei Olympic Committee boycott "if the situation in Tibet continues to worsen". Masahisa Tsujitani, a Japanese craftsman who makes shots used by many Olympic athletes, announced 14 April he refuses to allow his wares to be used at the games to protest China's treatment of protesters in Tibet.

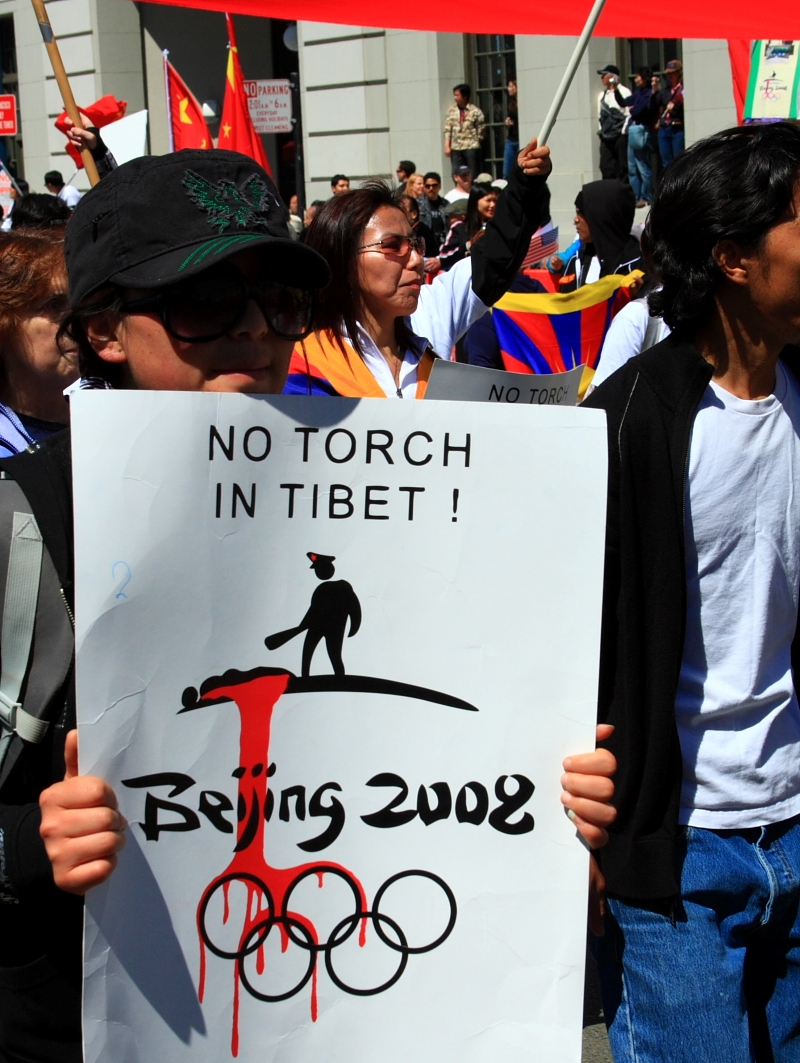
Pro-Tibetan independence protests during the Olympic Torch Relay

During the Olympic torch lighting ceremony in Greece on 24 March 2008, three Reporters Without Borders journalists breached a cordon of 1,000 police at the ancient Olympia stadium and interrupted the speech of Liu Qi, head of the Beijing Games committee. One protester tried to snatch the microphone as another unrolled a black flag showing the Olympic rings as handcuffs.

Nearly 50 Tibetan exiles in India began a global torch relay 25 March 2008 with a symbolic "Olympic" flame that ended in Tibet on 8 August 2008, the day of the Summer Games' opening ceremonies in Beijing. Although the torch was heavily guarded by local police and Chinese security agents wearing blue track suits, protesters attempting to stop the relay or take the torch were a significant problem along the route.

Disruption of the torch relay and foreign condemnation of China resulted in a backlash of nationalism and anti-foreigner sentiment in China. French goods and businesses were threatened with a reprisals for the assault on torch-bearers through Paris, France. French retailer Carrefour was boycotted, and there were flag burning protests outside some stores. Foreign media, particularly CNN, was criticised by state media outlet China Daily for its reporting of the Tibetan riots. The media reported that the attitudes of Han Chinese citizens towards non-Chinese and Chinese minorities in China noticeably worsened. In late April, Chinese Internet censors, who had previously permitted posts critical of non-Chinese, began blocking words such as "Carrefour", in what was seen as an attempt to calm tensions before the games.

=== Uyghurs ===
In 2008, the Chinese government announced that several terrorist plots by Uyghur separatists to disrupt the 2008 Olympic Games involving kidnapping athletes, journalists and tourists were foiled. The security ministry said 35 arrests were made in recent weeks and explosives had been seized in Xinjiang province. It said 10 others were held when police smashed another plot based in Xinjiang back in January to disrupt the Games. However, Uyghur activists accused the Chinese of fabricating terror plots to crack down on the people of the region and prevent them airing legitimate grievances. Some foreign observers were also skeptical, questioning if China was inflating a terror threat to justify a clampdown on dissidents before the Olympics.

In the run-up to the Summer Olympics in Beijing, during which world attention was drawn by pro-Tibet protests along the Olympic torch relay, Uyghur separatist groups staged protests in several countries. According to the Chinese government, a suicide bombing attempt on a China Southern Airlines flight in Xinjiang was thwarted in March 2008.

Four days before the Beijing Olympics, 16 Chinese police officers were killed and 16 injured in an attack in Kashgar by local merchants. Chinese police injured and damaged the equipment of two Japanese journalists sent to cover the story. Four days later a bombing in Kuqa killed at least two people.

== 2010 Winter Olympics ==
=== Context and the Four Host First Nations (FHFN) ===
Again building on lessons learned from previous Olympic Games held in Canada, the 2010 Winter Games saw an unprecedented level of involvement by and collaboration with indigenous people, namely in the form of the Four Host First Nations (FHFN). Composed of representatives from the Lil'wat, Musqueam, Squamish, and Tsleil-Waututh First Nations from the Vancouver and Whistler areas, the FHFN was created to ensure that "their cultures and traditions are respected and showcased throughout the planning, staging, and hosting of the 2010 Winter Games". But former Neskonlith chief Arthur Manuel has argued that the FHFN was created to "divide and rule over indigenous peoples in Canada" and that "Canada is deliberately trying to buy its way around its terrible human rights record by creating a media spin behind the Four Host First Nations". Calling the FHFN a "cheap and shallow scheme", he points out that in 2007 Canada was one of only four countries to vote against the adoption of the United Nations Declaration on the Rights of Indigenous Peoples.

=== Protests ===
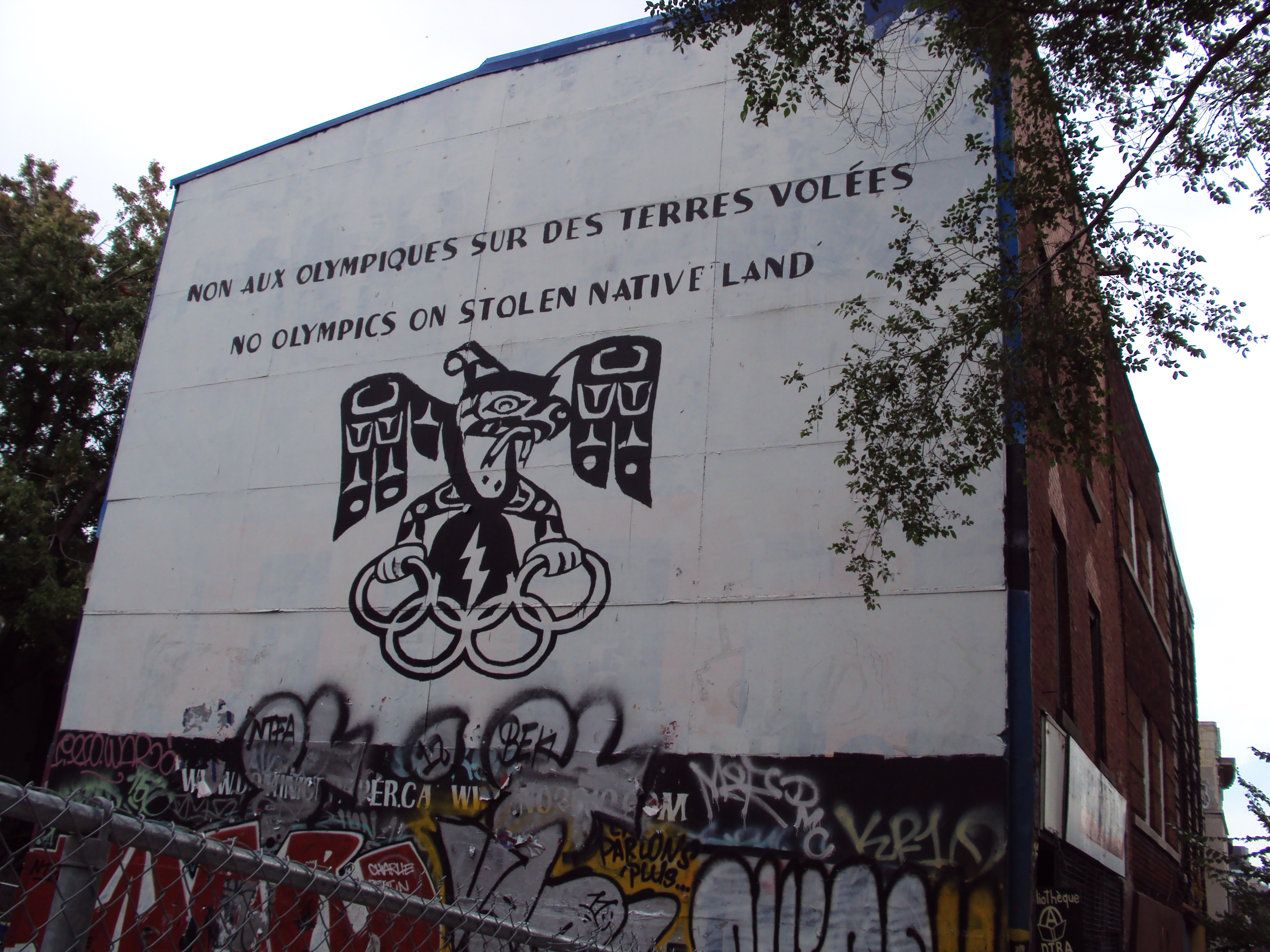
Large-scale signage with "No Olympics on Stolen Native Land" slogan

The 2010 Winter Games were met with massive protest locally and internationally. In October 2007, 1500 indigenous delegates at the Intercontinental Indigenous Gathering in Sonora, Mexico passed a resolution stating: "We reject the 2010 Winter Olympics on sacred and stolen territory of Turtle Island – Vancouver, Canada." This launched a global boycott of the 2010 Games with indigenous protests of the 2010 Winter Games rallying under the slogan, "No Olympics on stolen Native land." In an interview with Democracy Now!, commentator and artist Gord Hill explains how the slogan refers to the lack of treaties in British Columbia: "It's illegal, and it's actually immoral, because they were bound by their own laws to make treaties before they settled on any land or any business took place on sovereign indigenous land." The business referred to includes massive real estate developments as explained in a Dominion article:

Vast areas of unceded land that Indigenous communities depend on for hunting, fishing and general survival are at risk. Rivers, mountains and old-growth forests are being replaced by tourist resorts and highway expansions spurred by the 2010 games. Hundreds of millions of dollars have been spent to build new resorts and expand existing ones in order to attract and accommodate tourists, Olympic athletes and trainers.

One such development was the Sea-to-Sky highway expansion for which the Eagle Ridge Bluffs in North Vancouver (on Squamish territory) were to be destroyed. Harriet Nahanee, a 71-year-old Pacheedaht elder who had married into the Squamish First Nation, participated in a blockade to prevent this destruction. She was arrested along with 23 other protesters and imprisoned. Nahanee's already fragile health deteriorated while in prison and she died shortly after her release on February 24, 2007.

The 2010 Winter Games have also been criticized for being held in a city, province and country where so many indigenous people are living in desperate social conditions, particularly in Vancouver's Downtown Eastside (DTES), which, at the time of the Vancouver Games bid, was home to the largest off-reserve Aboriginal population in Vancouver. According to the International Indigenous Youth Network in 2007, pre-Olympic real estate development was causing increased homelessness in the DTES: "512 low-income housing units were lost between June 2003 and June 2005 and almost 300 low-income housing units have been lost to rent increases in the same time period." Kat Norris of the Indigenous Action Group further explains why this is of particular concern to First Nations people, who, as of 2007, constituted 30% of homeless people in the DTES: "The brutal history of residential schools coupled with present day racism and discrimination has meant that 'a high percentage of our people rely on services in the downtown eastside of Vancouver ... Many of these services are facing funding cuts.'" Those funding cuts were occurring while the province was expected to spend $1.5 billion on the Games, and the federal government, $2.5 billion.

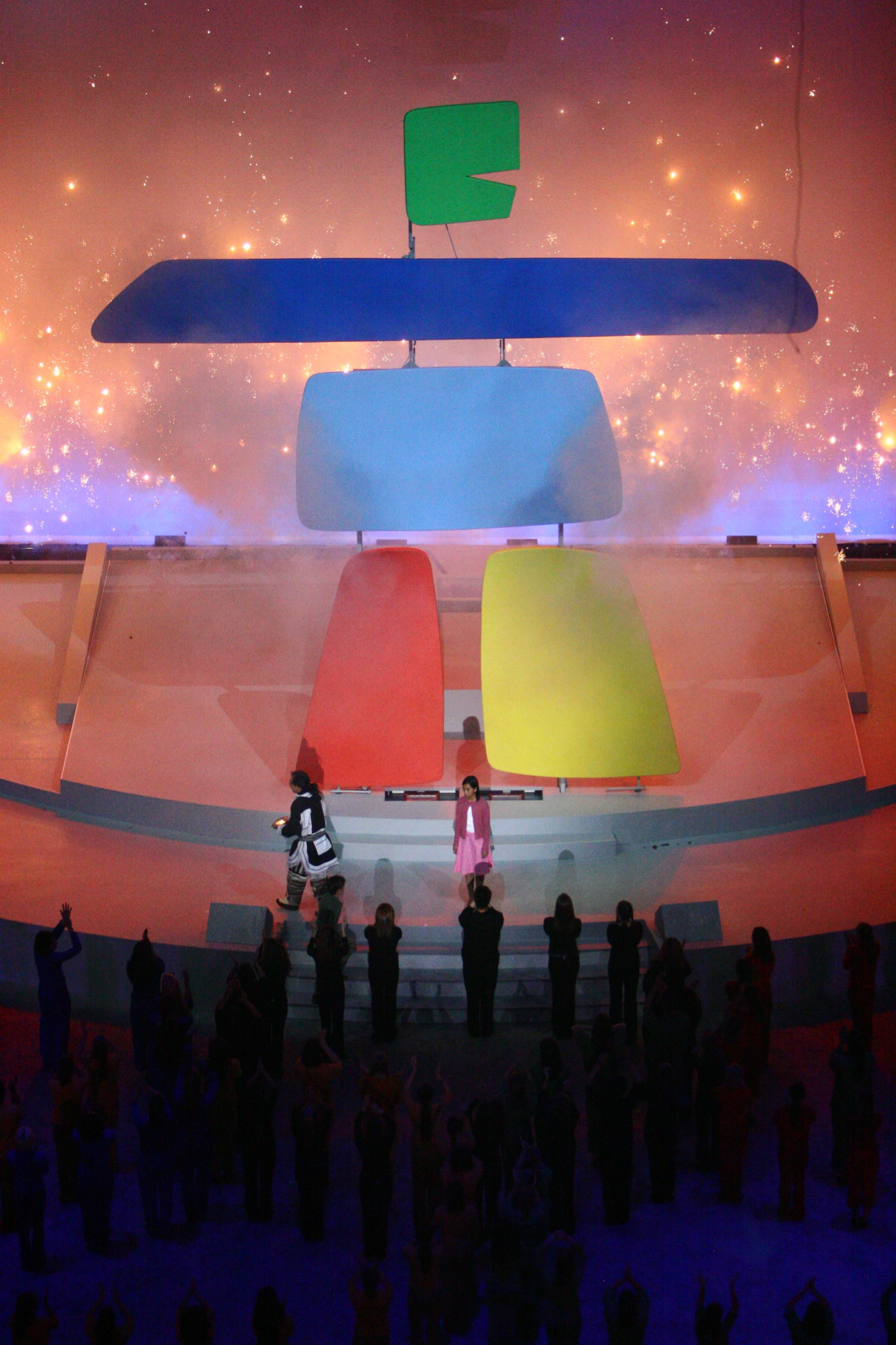
Unveiling ceremony of Ilanaaq the inukshuk, the 2010 Winter Games emblem, April 23, 2005

The high incidence of violence against indigenous women is telling of Canada's treatment of indigenous peoples: 500 First Nations women are missing from across Canada, and 76 of them are from British Columbia, where the Games were being hosted. It has been estimated that of the 69 women on the official list of those missing from the DTES in Vancouver, at least a third of them are of indigenous ancestry, compared to 1.9% representation of indigenous women in the general population of Vancouver.

Indigenous people have also raised concerns about the marketing and branding of the 2010 Winter Games, starting with the selection of the official Games logo, which was based on the Inuit symbol of the inuksuk, and given the name "Ilanaaq", which translates to "friend". Several indigenous leaders criticized the Vancouver Olympic Organizing Committee (VANOC) for not consulting with indigenous groups on the selection of the emblem, and for choosing one that did not reflect the local First Nations of the host city. President of the Union of BC Indian Chiefs Chief Stewart Phillip said: "The First Nations community at large is disappointed with the selection ... The decision-makers have decided not to reflect the First Nations and the Pacific region in the design of the logo ... I can't help but notice the remarkable resemblance it has to Pac-Man." Former Nunavut Commissioner Peter Irniq also criticized the design: "Inuit never build inuksuit with head, legs and arms"; and the process: "[Irniq] says every inukshuk has a meaning and a reason why it was built in a certain location. He says building the structures should not be taken lightly." Criticism was also directed at the fact that the logo designers were not Inuit or even First Nations. Some Inuit, in criticizing the adoption of "Ilanaaq", explicitly made the connection between cultural appropriation and commodification, "arguing that it dishonoured the traditional functions of inuksuk and risked turning them into commodities that could be sold for tourist consumption".

== 2012 Summer Olympics ==
=== Northern Ireland ===
During the 2012 Summer Olympic torch relay in Northern Ireland, Irish republican supporters had disputed the event in Northern Ireland to protest against the British intervention in Northern Ireland. During the events of the relay, the police and the military had arrested several suspected IRA members.

=== Falkland Islands ===
On 2 May 2012, on the 30th anniversary of the sinking of the Argentine cruiser ARA General Belgrano, an advertising film depicting the captain of Argentina's hockey team, Fernando Zylberberg, training in Stanley, Falkland Islands, was broadcast in Argentina under the slogan "To compete on British soil, we train on Argentine soil." While it was claimed by several major Argentine newspapers that the film had not been commissioned by the Argentine government, with it being produced by the local office of the Young & Rubicam advertising agency, the rights to it were purchased by the Office of the President for national broadcast. An IOC statement said "the games should not be part of a political platform", while Argentine Olympic Committee President Gerardo Werthein stated that "the Olympic Games cannot be used to make political gestures". Zylberberg stated that he had been unaware that the film would be used as a political advert. He subsequently was not selected for the Argentine hockey squad.

== 2014 Winter Olympics ==
=== Circassian protests ===
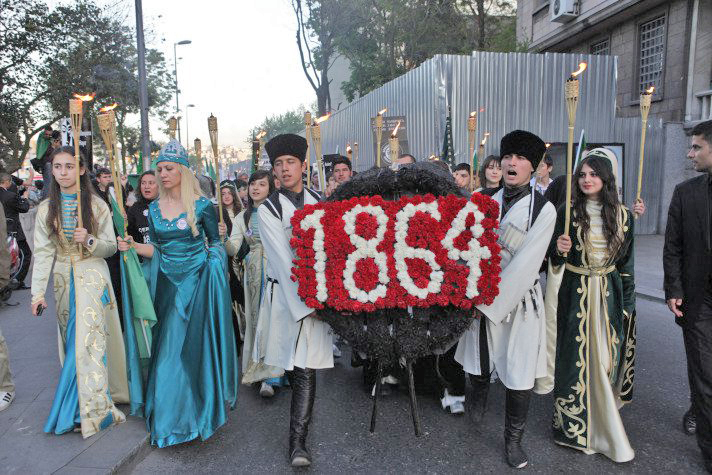
Turkish Circassians commemorate the banishment of the Circassians from Russia in Taksim Square, Istanbul

Circassian organisations have also spoken out against the 2014 Olympics, arguing that the Games will take place on land that had been inhabited by them since the beginning of recorded history by their ancestors until 1864, when the resolution of the Russian–Circassian War was stated to have caused the disappearance (variously by death or deportation) of 1.5 million Circassians, or 90–94% of the Circassian nation. They demanded the Sochi 2014 Olympics be cancelled or moved unless Russia would apologize for what the Circassians regarded to be a genocide. Some Circassian groups have not expressed outright opposition to the Olympics but argue that symbols of Circassian history and culture should be included in the format, as Australia, the United States, and Canada did with their indigenous populations in 2000, 2002, and 2010 respectively.

The games are viewed to be particularly offensive because they include the date of the 150th anniversary of what they consider a genocide. It has thus been a rallying cry for Circassian nationalists.

=== Use of Red Hill ===
In particular, there is much ire over the use of a hill called Red Hill. In 1864, a group of Circassians apparently tried to return home but were attacked and a battle ensued, ending in their massacre, and the naming of the hill for the blood spilled. There were skiing and snowboarding events planned to be held on this hill.

== 2018 Winter Olympics ==
During the opening ceremony, NBC analyst Joshua Cooper Ramo noted that Japan occupied Korea from 1910 to 1945, and then added, "But every Korean will tell you that Japan is a cultural and technological and economic example that has been so important to their own transformation." In The Korea Times, Jung Min-ho called the comment "incorrect and insensitive," writing that "Tens of thousands of Koreans and non-Koreans alike have criticized Ramo and NBC Sports on their social media, urging them to correct this misinformation and apologize." Koreans still feel the pain of all those years under the Japanese occupation. In response to this backlash, NBC issued an on-air apology and Ramo was fired from his job at NBC the next day.

== 2020 Summer Olympics ==
=== Liancourt Rocks ===
Russian and South Korean officials took issue with a map of the torch relay on the Games' official website, which depicted the disputed Liancourt Rocks (territory claimed by Japan but governed by South Korea) and Kuril Islands (territory claimed by Japan and Russia) as part of Japan. Maria Zakharova, spokeswoman of the Russian Ministry of Foreign Affairs, described the inclusion as "illegal", and accused the Tokyo Organising Committee of "politicising" the Games.

=== Usage of the Rising Sun Flag ===
Rising Sun Flag

The Japanese government's refusal to ban the controversial Rising Sun Flag in the Olympic sites has been criticized as going against the Olympic spirit, as the flag is offensive to East and Southeast Asian peoples due to its historical usage by the Imperial Japanese military during World War II, as well as its current usage by racist hate groups in Japan, such as Zaitokukai. The flag, often compared to the Nazi swastika, is associated with war crimes and atrocities committed under the Japanese Empire, as well as contemporary Japan's far-right nationalist attempts to revise, deny, and romanticise its imperialistic past.

The controversial flag is currently banned by FIFA, and Japan was sanctioned by the Asian Football Confederation after Japanese football fans flew it at an AFC Champions League match in 2017.

In September 2019, the South Korean parliamentary committee for sports asked the organizers of 2020 Summer Olympics in Tokyo to ban the Rising Sun Flag, and the Chinese Civil Association for Claiming Compensation from Japan sent a letter to the International Olympic Committee in order to ban the flag.

== 2022 Winter Olympics ==
During the bidding process of the Olympics, many Tibetan protesters had criticized the IOC for allowing China to host the 2022 Olympics due to policies against Tibetans. In the aftermath of the 2019 leak of the Xinjiang papers and the 2019–20 Hong Kong protests, calls were made for a boycott of the 2022 games.

== See also ==
- Antisemitism in the Olympic Games

== Sources ==
- Beaster-Jones, Jayson (2013). "Commodification". The Grove Dictionary of American Music. Oxford University Press.
- Brownell, Susan (2008). "Introduction: Bodies before Boas, Sport before the Laughter Left". The 1904 Anthropology Days and Olympic Games: Sport, Race, and American Imperialism. Lincoln and London: University of Nebraska Press. ISBN 978-0-8032-1098-1.
- CBC Sports (26 Apr 2005). "Olympic Inukshuk Irks Inuit Leader".
- Cooper, Karen Coody (2008). Spirited Encounters: American Indians Protest Museum Policies and Practices. Lanham, Maryland: AltaMira Press. ISBN 978-0-7591-1089-2.
- Dean, Amber R. (2009). Hauntings: Representations of Vancouver's disappeared women (PDF) (PhD thesis). University of Alberta. Archived (PDF) from the original on 7 April 2014.
- Government of Canada (23 December 2009). "The Four Host First Nations – Canada 2010". p. Canada's Games. Archived from the original on 21 December 2013.
- Hill, Gord (2012). The Anti-Capitalist Resistance Comic Book. Vancouver: Arsenal Pulp Press. ISBN 978-1-55152-444-3.
- International Olympic Committee. "All Games since 1896".
- Lindsay, Hillary Bain (4 April 2007). "Stolen Games: 'No Olympics on Stolen Native Land' Has Become the Battle Cry for Indigenous Resistance to the Vancouver Olympics". The Dominion. Archived from the original on 7 April 2014.
- Lopez, Franklin (12 February 2010). "Vancouver Activists Greet Winter Olympics Opening Ceremony with People's Summit, Protest". Democracy Now!.
- Manuel, Arthur (25 January 2010). "Vancouver Olympics Can't Hide Canada's Dismal Record on Indigenous Peoples". The Georgia Straight. Archived from the original on 7 April 2014.
- Miller, Heather Andrews (May 2005). "Olympic committee blunders with Inuit-inspired logo". Canadian Periodicals Index Quarterly.
- National Geographic (12 February 2010). "Olympic Logo No 'Friend' to Some". National Geographic.
- O'Bonsawin, Christine M. (2012). "Indigenous Peoples and Canadian-Hosted Olympic Games". In Janice Forsyth; Audrey R. Giles (eds.). Aboriginal Peoples and Sport in Canada. Vancouver: UBC Press. ISBN 978-0-7748-2423-1.
- O'Bonsawin, Christine M. (2010). "'No Olympics on stolen native land': contesting Olympic narratives and asserting indigenous rights within the discourse of the 2010 Vancouver Games". Sport in Society: Cultures, Commerce, Media, Politics. 13 (1): 143–156. doi:10.1080/17430430903377987. S2CID 143730579.
- Paley, Dawn (16 March 2010). "'No Olympics on Stolen Native Land' Resonates Across Canada". The Media Co-op. Archived from the original on 7 April 2014.
- Parezo, Nancy J. (2008). "A 'Special Olympics:' Testing Racial Strength and Endurance at the 1904 Louisiana Purchase Exposition". In Susan Brownell (ed.). The 1904 Anthropology Days and Olympic Games: Sport, Race, and American Imperialism. Lincoln and London: University of Nebraska Press. ISBN 978-0-8032-1098-1.
- Peavy, Linda; Ursula Smith (2008). "Leaving the Whites…Far Behind Them: The Girls from Fort Shaw (Montana) Indian School, Basketball Champions of the 1904 World's Fair". In Susan Brownell (ed.). The 1904 Anthropology Days and Olympic Games: Sport, Race, and American Imperialism. Lincoln and London: University of Nebraska Press. ISBN 978-0-8032-1098-1.
- Revolutionary Hip-Hop Report, The (25 July 2010). "No Olympics on Stolen Native Land". Revolutionary Hip-Hop Report. Archived from the original on 8 April 2014.
- Rolbin-Ghanie, Maya (1 March 2008). "'It's All About The Land': Native Resistance to the Olympics". The Dominion. Archived from the original on 27 July 2011.
- Schantz, Otto J. (2008). "Pierre de Coubertin's Concepts of Race, Nation, and Civilization". In Susan Brownell (ed.). The 1904 Anthropology Days and Olympic Games: Sport, Race, and American Imperialism. Lincoln and London: University of Nebraska Press. ISBN 978-0-8032-1098-1.
- Statistics Canada (2001). "Aboriginal Population, City of Vancouver – 2001 Census".
- Tomlinson, Alan (2005). Sport and leisure cultures. Minneapolis MN: University of Minnesota Press. ISBN 978-0-8166-3382-1.
- Wonders, Karen. "Development: Human Rights Abuse". p. First Nations – Land Rights and Environmentalism in British Columbia.
