= Fort Shaw Indian School Girls Basketball Team =

The Fort Shaw Indian School Girls Basketball Team was made up of seven Native American students from various tribes who attended the Fort Shaw Indian Boarding School in Fort Shaw, Montana, United States. They became World Champions at the 1904 Louisiana Purchase Exposition (more commonly known as the St. Louis World Fair) by defeating basketball teams from across the United States and world.

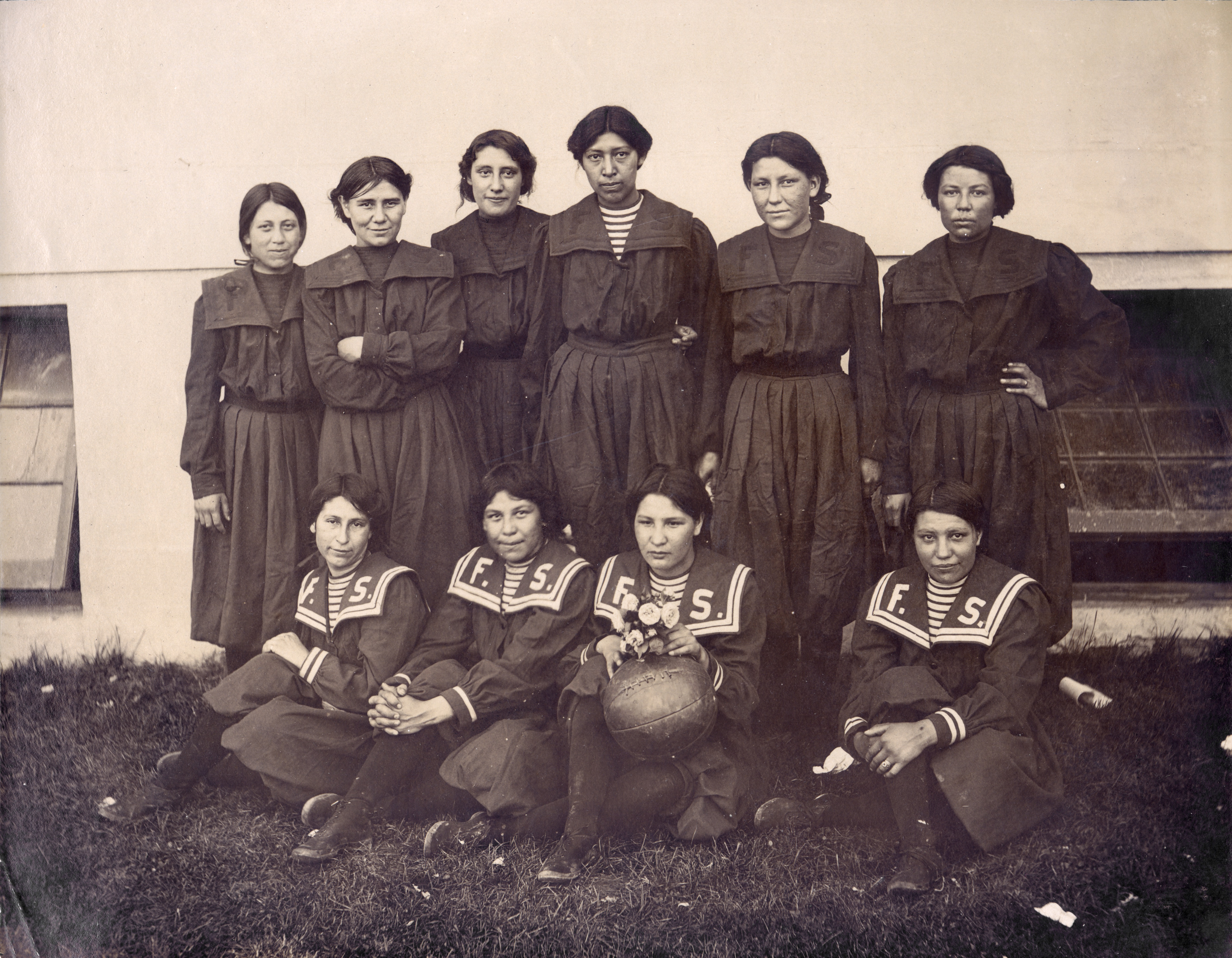
The Fort Shaw Indian School Girls Basketball Team at the 1904 St. Louis World's Fair in uniform.

== History of Indian Boarding schools ==
American Indian Boarding schools, otherwise known as Indian Residential Schools, were established in the 19th and 20th centuries with the primary purpose of assimilating Native American children and teenagers into mainstream Euro-American culture. Richard Henry Pratt opened the first Indian Boarding school, the Carlisle Indian Industrial School, basing the curriculum and structure on his years of military background. Pratt's goal was to "kill the Indian and save the man." The strict assimilation policies at the schools often prevented students from visiting their families and returning to familiar language and customs. Upon arrival, students were forced to give up any "tribal" clothing and were given new Christian names. The Fort Shaw Indian School was modeled after Pratt's Carlisle school.

=== Sport at Indian boarding schools ===
Athletics were an important aspect of the boarding schools across the country and were fundamental for assimilation. Football was popular at the Carlisle Industrial school and they became well known for their football and other athletic programs. Most historians agree that the primary purpose of athletic teams at Indian boarding schools was to promote physical health. Diseases and poor health were constant points of concern for the Indian boarding schools, a fact that became well known after the 1928 Meriam Report exposed the high number of deaths among students. Medical research at the time cited that physical activity in general and outdoor activity more specifically were the best practices to combat disease. Also common in American society at the time, sport was assumed to help build moral character by instilling hard-work, discipline, and sportsmanship, especially in boys. Pratt also believed that athletic teams of Indians would show the white community that Native Americans were more than "savages" and capable of being good sportsmen with whites in their own games.

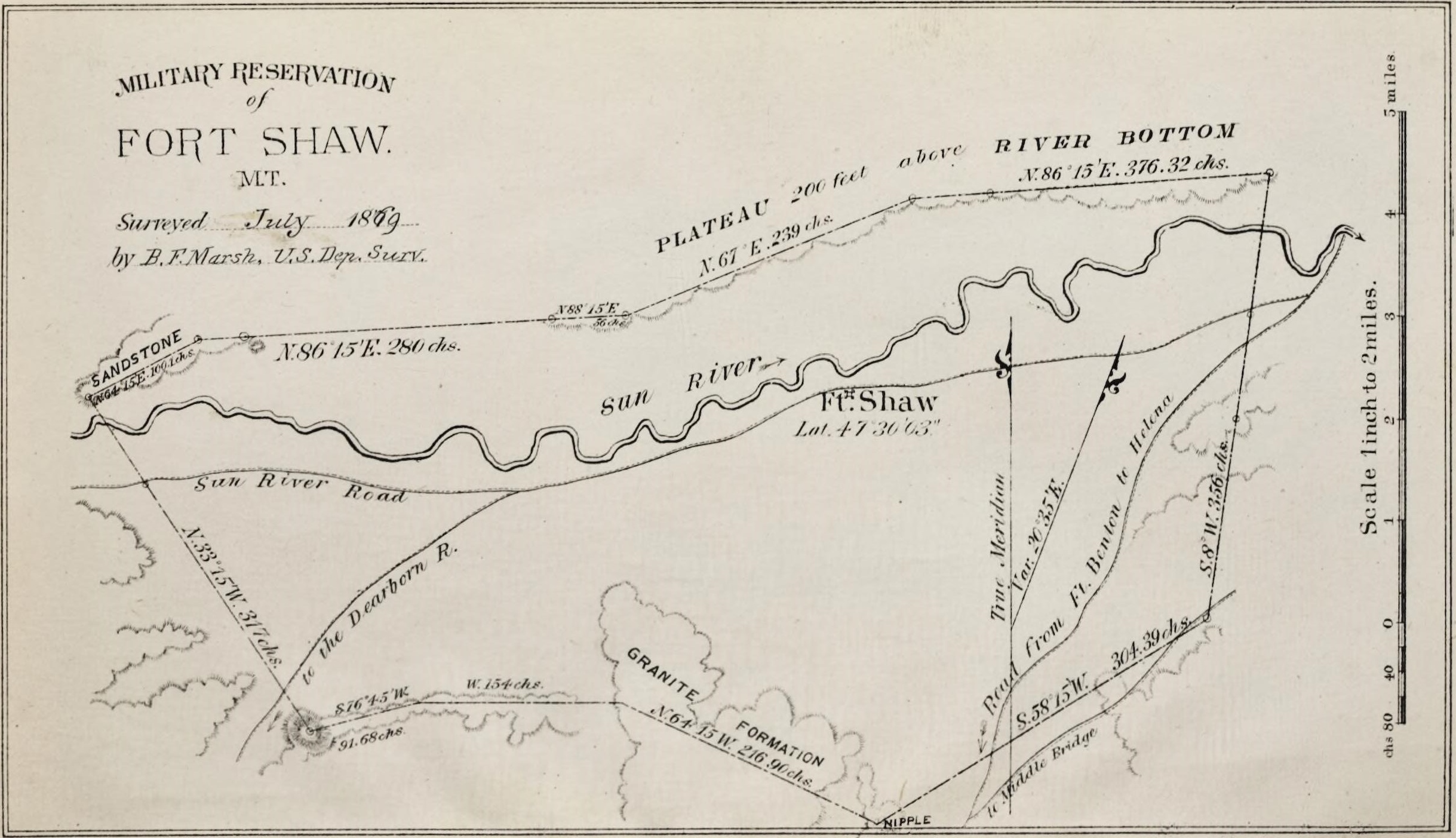
Map of Fort Shaw as a military outpost

== History of Fort Shaw Indian School ==
Abandoned by the United States Army on 1 July 1891, Fort Shaw (located in north central Montana) was originally built between Fort Benton and Helena to protect the settlers from Indian attacks. In 1892, nearly 5,000 acres of the fort and its surrounding land were re-purposed as the Fort Shaw Government Industrial Indian Boarding School by the Department of the Interior after a government school in northeastern Montana burned down. It opened its doors on December 27 of that year with 52 students. By the turn of the century the school had over 300 students, ages five to eighteen, with thirty employees. Typically, academic classes were taught in the morning with more vocational courses, like cooking and sewing, in the afternoons. The Blackfoot tribe saw the greatest representation at the Fort Shaw school.

The school lost government funding on April 17, 1910 as a result of a growing support for the abolishment of non-reservation schools in Congress and growing integration of public schools. The site was ceded to the U.S. government.

== Beginnings of the Fort Shaw Indian School Girls Basketball Team ==
Fort Shaw is highlighted in red.

The Fort Shaw school had boys' basketball, football, and track teams that competed against regional high schools and colleges from the schools opening. Originally Fort Shaw girls were only offered a "physical culture class," but by 1897 basketball was introduced to the Fort Shaw girls by student and "Indian Assistant" Josephine Langley. Langley was introduced to the sport after a semester at the Carlisle Boarding School and was supported by superintendent Frederick Campbell in establishing basketball as an indoor sport for students to play during the winter. The dance hall of the Fort Shaw military establishment was converted into a court and in 1902, a girls team was started with a team of seven girls who played together for the next three years. The reception to the girls' basketball team was just as enthusiastic as for the boys because in most Native American cultures, girls were encouraged to play sports with the same intensity as the boys. It was also the only sport girls were allowed to participate in.

When the team was started, none of the girls had played basketball before, although they had played shinney and double ball (two related Indian field games). Girls at the Fort Shaw school played by the boys' rules: full-court, 20-minute halves with no breaks rules. The games were generally low-scoring, partially due to the time length of the game, running the clock while retrieving the ball and conducting center court tip-offs after every basket. The players' cumbersome uniforms and the slightly bigger ball than the one used today also contributed to the low scores.

=== Coaches and assistants ===
Frederick C. Campbell became the school's second superintendent in 1898. For years he doubled as superintendent and coach when the team started in 1902. He resigned from the school in 1908. As superintendent, he expanded the school's athletic program because he believed it would help the student's self-esteem as it had helped him while playing baseball at the University of Kansas. He was the one to introduce competitive basketball to Fort Shaw as well as in surrounding schools so the team would have competition.

Sadie Malley became the assistant coach in the team's second season. She had been teaching at the school since 1899. She had been Josephine Langely's substitute in coaching the team before they became competitive and Campbell took over. It was under her insistence that the team not play by the "girls' rules" (half-court).

Lizzie Wirth, the sister of player Nettie Wirth, joined the team during their second season to serve as a chaperone and choreographed exercises and drills meant to prepare the girls for programs they performed at the 1904 fair.

Fern Evans was the music teacher at Fort Shaw who organized the music program that they performed at the fair to fund their travel and games.

Lillie B. Crawford was tasked with training the team in recitation performances also for funding their games and travels.

=== Players ===
==== Original 7 players ====
- Genie Butch, left guard: born to an Assiniboine mother and white father, she grew up in the Fort Peck reservation. At fifteen, she started as a substitute but later became perhaps the best known of the players and received the most attention. In a Great Falls Tribune article about the World Champion making game, coach Adams said that Genie distinguished herself to the greatest extent.
- Belle Johnson, left forward and left guard, team Captain: Born in Belt, Montana to a Piegan mother and a white father, Johnson transferred to Fort Shaw from Holy Family Mission. Johnson and Minnie Burton traded positions during their game against the Montana State University team. She became captain during the second season after Josephine Langely left the team.
- Nettie Wirth, forward and center: daughter of an Assiniboine mother and German immigrant father. She attended the government school at Fort Peck before it burned down, an event that led to the creation of the school at Fort Shaw. She was six years old when she arrived at the school and played on the team ten years later. Though she started as a right forward, she and Josephine Langely traded places due to Wirth's vertical jump being better for winning center court tip-offs.
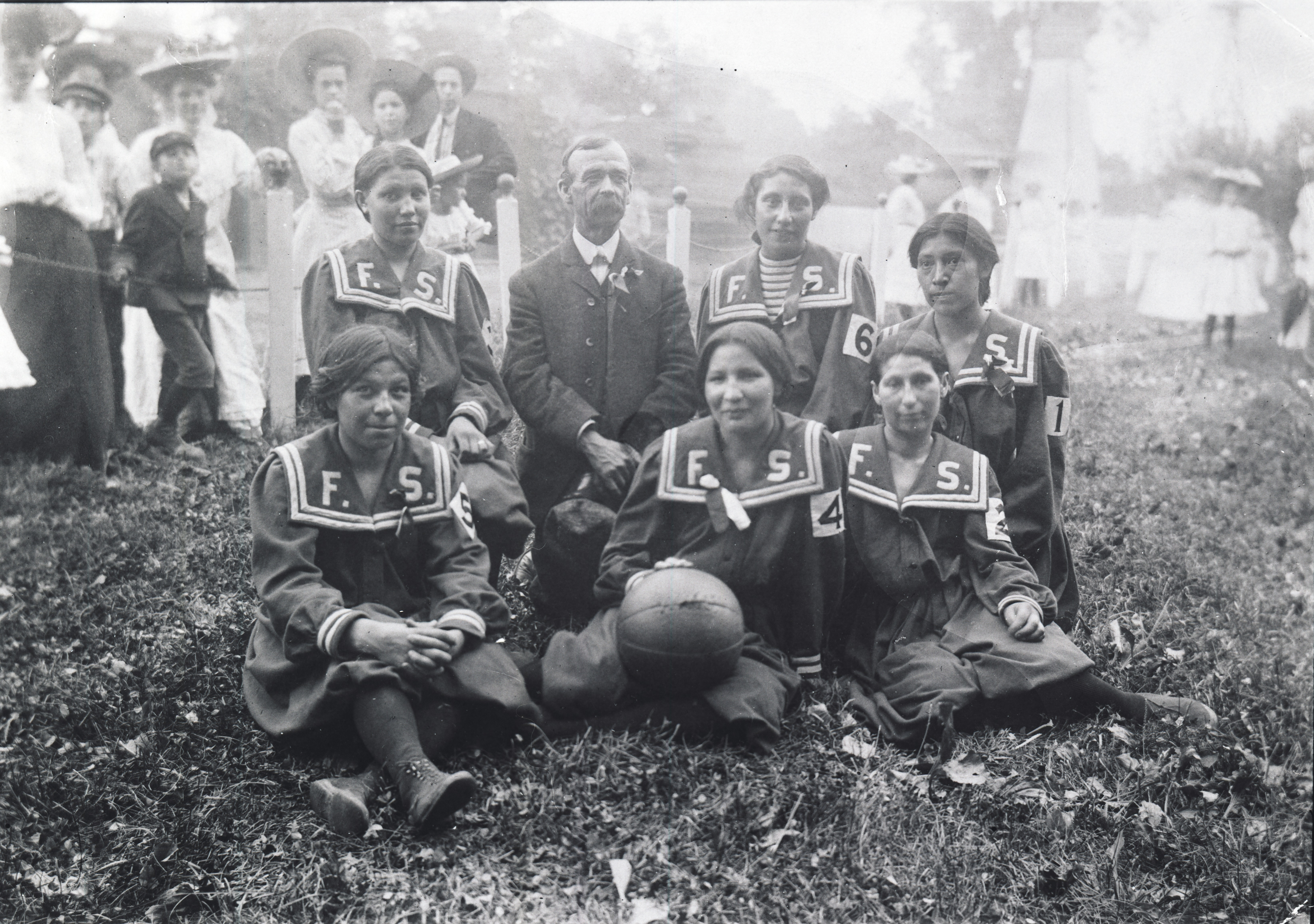
  Members of Fort Shaw Indian School Girls Basketball Team (Front- G. Butch, B. Johnson, E. Sansaver; Back- N. Wirth, Mr. McCutcheon, K. Snell, M. Burton)
- "Big Minnie" Minnie Burton, left guard and left forward: transferred from the reservation school at Fort Hall, Idaho. Her mother, who was West Shoshone, died when Burton was nine leading her to be raised by her Lemhi Shoshone father and step-mother. She was chosen for the team soon after arriving to the school in 1902 whereas the other players who had been attending the school for many years. Burton and Belle Johnson traded positions during their game against the Montana State University team.
- Emma Rose Sansaver, right forward: Born in Havre, Montana to a Métis father and Chippewa-Cree mother. She transferred from St. Paul's mission school on the Fort Belknap reservation in 1897 after the death of her father and joined the team at eighteen. She was the shortest girl on the team.
- Josephine Langely, center and right guard, team captain: daughter of a Piegan mother and a Métis father who served at Fort Shaw when it was still a military base. She was born in Birch Creek, Montana in 1880. She began attending the school the year it opened and by 16 worked as a matron. At twenty-two, she was the oldest girl on the team. She started as a center but traded positions with Nettie Wirth in the early days of the team. She left the team after the first season to get married and become a full time employee of the school. Genie Butch took her position on the court and Belle Johnson took her role as captain.
- Delia Gebeau, left guard: Born to a Spokane mother and Métis father, Gebeau was a 16 years-old when she joined the team as a substitute along with Genie Butch.

==== Players who joined in the second season ====
- Genevieve "Gen" Healy, guard: Born to a Gros Ventre mother, Healy transferred from a mission school on the Fort Belknap reservation in 1899 following the death of her mother. She joined the team at 15 years-old.
- Catherine "Katie" Snell, guard: Born to a German immigrant father and Assiniboine mother, Snell transferred from the Fort Belknap agency. She joined the team at 17 years-old.
- Sarah Mitchell, forward: born in Wolf Point, Montana to an Assiniboine-Chippewa mother and Shoshone father.
- Flora Lucero, forward: born near Choteau, Montana to a Chippewa-Cree mother and Spanish immigrant father.

== The Road to World Champions ==
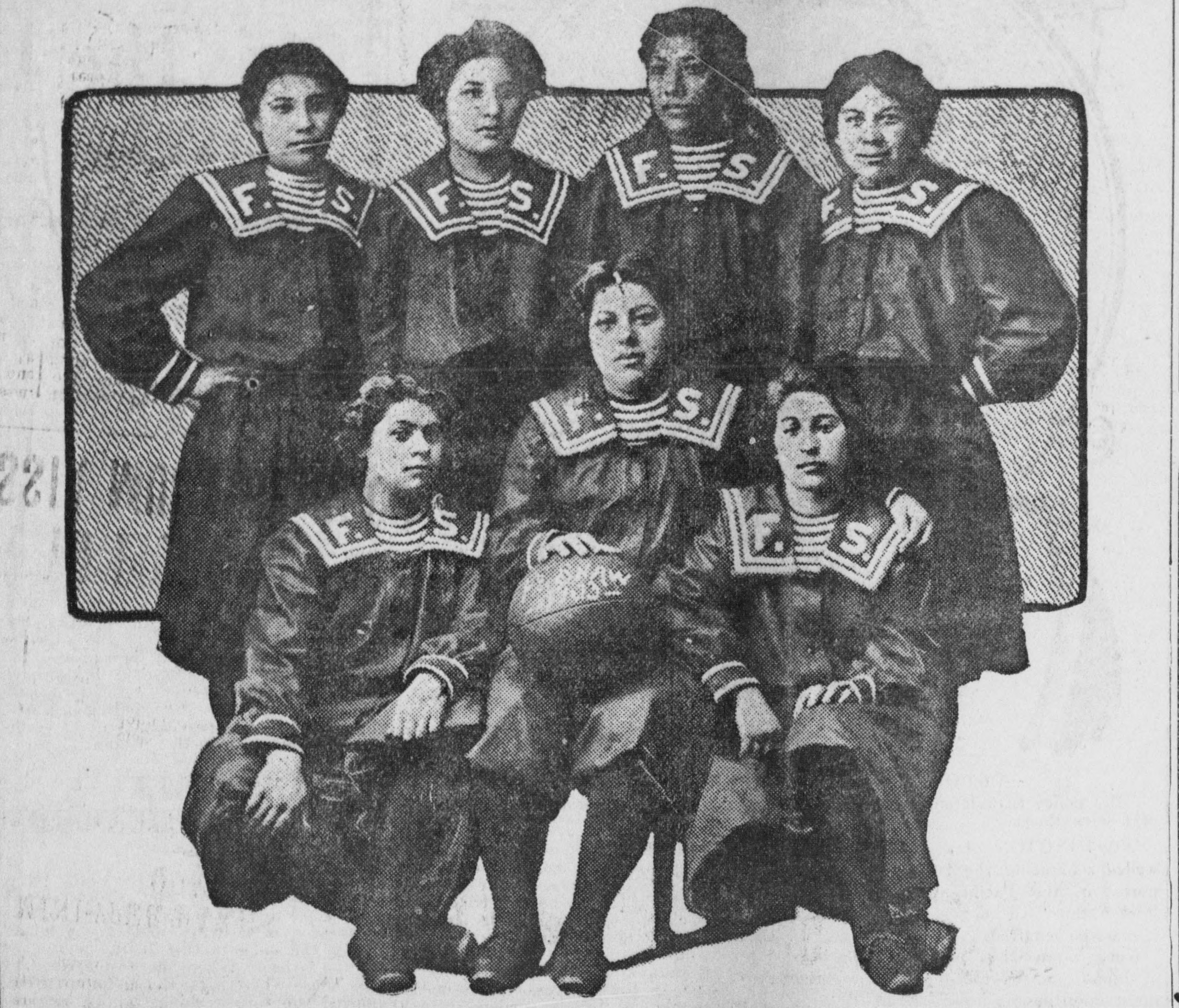
"In January 1904, at Fort Shaw Indian school of Great Falls, Montana, the girls' basketball team held the Montana state championship. The girls were all natives of the Rocky Mountain district, and were in grades 7 and 8 (with the exception of the player holding the ball, who was married in December 1903 and became a school employee)."

=== 1902–03 Season ===
The school's season record was 9 wins and 2 losses. It was a year of growing recognition for the team as well as the sport in general.

==== Notable games ====
- vs. Sun River: the team's first game and first win
- vs. Butte High: first long distance game. They won 15-9.
- vs. Helena High: first loss with the score of 15-6. The two teams played again later in the season and Fort Shaw avenged its loss with a score of 28-10.
- vs. Butte Parochial: second and final loss of the season with the score 15-6. The two teams played again later in the season and Fort Shaw avenged its loss with a score of 37-6.
- vs. Montana State University in Missoula: won with the score of 19-9 against the college team
- vs. Montana Agricultural College in Bozeman: Fort Shaw defeated this team twice, the first time 36-9 and the next 20-0.

=== 1903–04 Season ===
For their second season, the team was unable to defend their title as unofficial state champions. Possible reasons include trouble scheduling games or reluctance from other teams to play them. Campbell instead schedules exhibition games around the state. At these games, the athletes performed mandolin concerts, literary recitations, and calisthenics in order to pay for food and lodging. They eventually traveled outside the state to North Dakota and Minnesota before heading to St. Louis for the fair. As the superintendent, Campbell had been asked by the fair to send students to the school. He recommended the basketball team but ultimately left the choice to participate up to the players.

== 1904 Louisiana Purchase Exposition ==
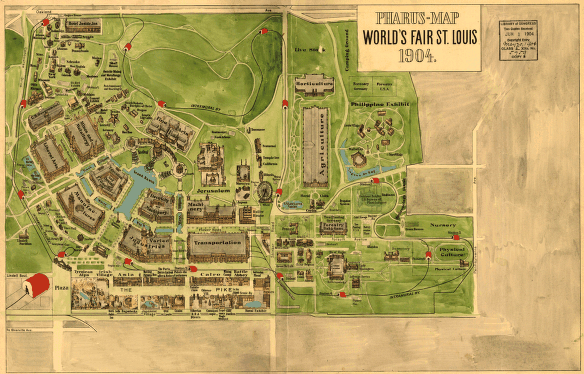
Map of 1904 St. Louis World's Fair

Informally known the 1904 St. Louis World's Fair, the Louisiana Purchase Exposition was held from April 30 to December 1, 1904. The 657 acre fairground provided entertainment through performances, circuses, battle reenactments, a Ferris wheel, and anthropology exhibits.

=== Anthropology Days ===
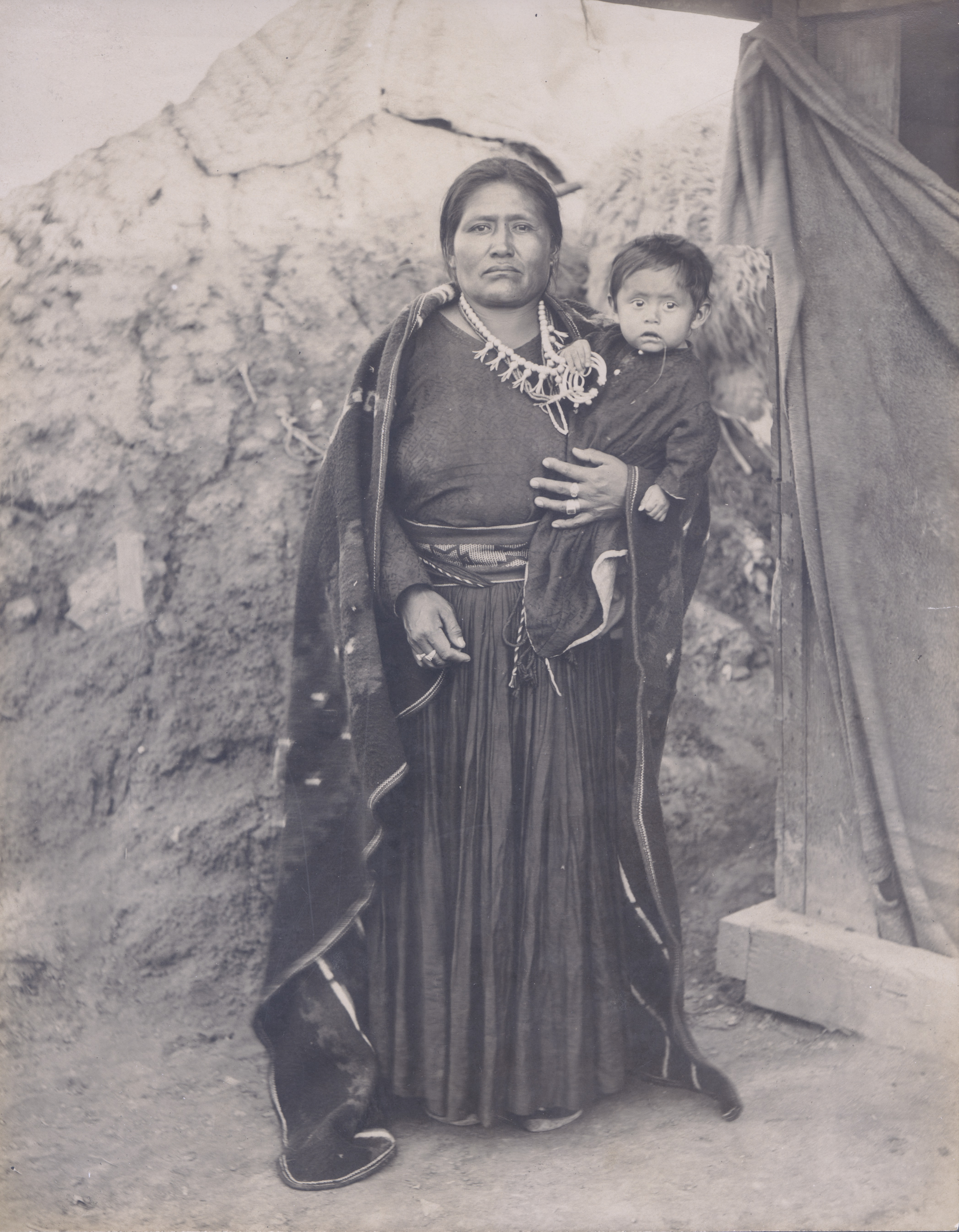
"Navaho woman (with child)." on display as part of the Anthropology Days exhibits. Courtesy of the Department of Anthropology, 1904 World's Fair

The Louisiana Purchase Exposition is known for its many Anthropology Days displays of "exotic peoples" to, "reaffirm notions of racial superiority while simultaneously challenging many popular stereotypes." Native American people were put on display to demonstrate their possibility for "progress." Anthropology Days architect W. J. McGee designed his events to illustrate the evolution of humans from "savagery" to "barbarism" to "civilization." The displays were also ways for the imperialist countries who presented them to justify their subjugation of indigenous people worldwide.

==== Model Indian School ====
The Model Indian School, home to 150 students during the fair, was located on "Indian Hill" at the fair next to the fair's own reservation where traditional housing was set up and ancient crafts were created in order to compare the students to those on the reservation. The Model Indian School was strategically placed between the "realistic" huts of the most "savage" human exhibits and the green fields of the modern athletic complex, demonstrating the evolutionary scale in a visual and physical nature.

The girls' presence and decorum at the fair helped show fair-goers that Indians were not "savages." Historian Nancy Parezo notes that the Fort Shaw Girls' championship title disproved theories of Anglo-European athletic superiority, something that the anthropologists studying the fair would never have admitted.

=== Becoming World Champions ===
The basketball exhibition ended with a best of three competition between the Fort Shaw seven member team faced off against the Missouri All-Stars, alumnae of Central High in St. Louis. After an entire summer playing exhibition games at the Model Indian School twice a week, the anticipation was high for the games. Fort Shaw won the first game 24-2. The St. Louis team failed to show up for the second game and forfeited. However, the team asked to continue the competition and Fort Shaw agreed. At the end of the second game the score stood 17 to 6, winning the Fort Shaw girls the title as the basketball champions of the 1904 St. Louis World's Fair. On August 25 the girls won the silver and gold cup for women's basketball at the fair. Despite being signed up to play only in the women's basketball bracket, the team won in the general competition, something which was conveniently omitted from Spalding's Athletic Almanac.

== After the Fair ==
With their heads held high from their victory and with their new title, they returned home to Montana. The team continued to play basketball and were, "Willing to Play Against Any Girls' Team in Existence" as a Great Falls Tribute headline stated in the June 27th 1904.

Immediately following the girls' championship success, seven of the school's graduates were promised all-paid-for educations at Vassar College from the Christian Philanthropist Charles H. Madison. His generosity, however, seemed short lived when he instead decided to tour the team in "vaudeville" fashion to make money for his work with rescue missions. The team became quickly disillusioned and returned home in December.

The team played for one more year after the Exposition, during which they won the Championship of the Pacific Northwest, before the team was disbanded due to the closing of the school.

== Contemporary media attention ==
- 2009 PBS Documentary: Playing for the World
- 2014 Book: Full Court Quest
- 2017 Stuff You Missed in History Class Podcast pt. 1
- 2017 Stuff You Missed in History Class Podcast pt. 2
