= Edward Baldwin Whitney =

American lawyer and judge (1857–1911)

United States Assistant Attorney General
- In office 1895–1897
- President: Grover Cleveland
- Preceded by: Joshua Eric Dodge
- Succeeded by: James Edmund Boyd

Personal details
- Born: August 16, 1857
- Died: January 5, 1911 (aged 53)
- Party: Democratic
- Spouse: A. Josepha Newcomb
- Children: 3, including Hassler Whitney
- Parent(s): William Dwight Whitney; Elizabeth Wooster Baldwin
- Relatives: Roger Sherman Baldwin (grandfather)
- Education: Yale College; Columbia Law School
- Occupation: Lawyer; judge

Edward Baldwin Whitney (August 16, 1857 – January 5, 1911) was an American lawyer and judge.

== Life ==
Edward Baldwin Whitney was born August 16, 1857. His father was linguist William Dwight Whitney (1827–1894) of the New England Dwight family. His mother was Elizabeth Wooster Baldwin, daughter of US Senator and Governor of Connecticut Roger Sherman Baldwin.

He graduated from Yale College, 1878, where he was a member of Skull and Bones along with future US President William H. Taft. After Yale he went on to the Columbia Law School and was admitted to the bar of New York, 1880.

He was managing clerk, Bristow, Peet & Opdyke. In 1883, with General Henry Lawrence Burnett, who was a member of that firm, he formed the firm of Burnett & Whitney.

He was a justice of the First District New York State Supreme Court from 1909–1911.

Aside from his judgeship, he never held elected office. He was an active Democrat and organizer of the national association of Democratic clubs, secretary from its organization, 1888–90. At the May 1892 convention at Syracuse he was chosen as delegate to the National Democratic Convention at Chicago.

Whitney was a trustee, Reform Club; member, Century Club; Democratic Club; Skull and Bones; and of the Lawyers' club and of the bar association of New York. He was appointed by President Grover Cleveland to be Assistant Attorney General of the United States.

He married A. Josepha Newcomb in 1896, who was active in the suffrage movement. In 1912, she organized the first Cornwall meeting in support of voting rights for women, the daughter of astronomer and mathematician Simon Newcomb. Her sister, Anita Newcomb McGee, was a doctor who helped establish the Army Nurse Corps.

Their son Hassler Whitney was the famous Princeton University mathematician. Their son William Dwight Whitney was an international attorney who represented actress Adrianne Allen in her divorce from actor Raymond Massey; William Whitney then married Adrianne, and his first wife Dorothy married Raymond. Their son Simon N. Whitney was the chief economist and director of the Bureau of Economics at the Federal Trade Commission, 1956–1961, and also was an economist with the Federal Administration of Export Control.

He died January 5, 1911. He had just been appointed to the New York State Supreme Court, and contracted a cold that turned into pneumonia on his return from being sworn in.
