= Annie Maher =

American politician (died 1951)

Member of the Connecticut House of Representatives from New Haven
- In office 1929–1933 Serving with Pietro Diana
- Preceded by: Samuel E. Hoyt; Edith V. Cook
- Succeeded by: Josepha Newcomb Whitney; Philip R. Pastore

Personal details
- Born: New Haven, Connecticut, U.S.
- Died: October 18, 1951
- Party: Democratic

Annie H. Maher (died October 18, 1951) was an American politician who served in the Connecticut House of Representatives from 1929 to 1933, representing the city of New Haven as a Democrat.
