= Lincoln School (Farley, Iowa) =

- U.S. National Register of Historic Places
- Location within Iowa Location within the United States
- Location: About 4 miles (6.4 km) north of Farley
- Coordinates: 42°29′24″N 90°59′07″W
- Area: less than one acre
- NRHP reference No.: 75000687
- Added to NRHP: July 24, 1975

Lincoln School, also known as the W.J. McGee Boyhood School, is a historic building located north of Farley, Iowa, United States. This is a typical Iowa one-room schoolhouse that features frame construction, rectangular shape, and a gable roof. The entryway on the front was added in the 1890s. The building is historically significant with its association with W.J. McGee, a respected inventor, geologist, anthropologist, and ethnologist. While he was largely self-taught, McGee attended school here during the four winter months from about 1858 to 1867. The building was listed on the National Register of Historic Places in 1975.
