= Troughton scale =

US standard of length, 1832 to 1856

The Troughton scale is a measurement scale that de facto served as the first national standard of length in the United States, from 1832 until 1856.

== Physical description ==
The measurement scale spans 82 inches and is subdivided to tenths of inches. It is marked on a silver inlay in a brass bar; the bar itself is about 86 inches long.

== History ==
The scale was prepared for the Office of Coast Survey by Troughton of London and was brought to the United States in 1815 by F. R. Hassler, who a year later became the first Superintendent of the Survey of the Coast and, in 1832, first Superintendent of Weights and Measures.

At the time, the United States Government was principally financed by duties on imports and exports (the federal income tax did not become a permanent feature of the US system until 1913). The appropriate import and export taxes on commercial items were determined at customhouses maintained by the federal government at various ports of entry. A reliable and uniform system of weights and measure was necessary for this system to work, as well as for settling commercial disputes.

In 1830, the US Senate requested the Secretary of the Treasury to ‘cause a comparison to be made of the standards of weight and measure now used at the principal custom houses in the United States, and report to the Senate at the next session of Congress.’ To carry out this mandate, the Treasury Secretary appointed Hassler, who found that (as was suspected) large discrepancies existed among the weights and measures in use at the principal customhouses at different US ports.

The Treasury Department immediately started constructing new necessary weights and measures for the customs service. For this purpose, the Treasury Department had to choose standards, and the standard yard adopted was the 36 inches comprised between the 27th and the 63rd inches of the Troughton scale. This 36-inch space was supposed to be identical with the English standard at 62 °F, though it had never been directly compared with that standard. The original English standard, in turn, was made in 1758, but was then damaged beyond the point of usability in the great fire of 1834.

In 1856, the US received two copies of the new British standard yard after Britain completed the manufacture of new imperial standards to replace those lost in 1834. As standards of length, the new yards, especially bronze No. 11, were far superior to the Troughton scale. They were therefore accepted by the Office of Weights and Measures (a predecessor of NIST) as length standards of the United States.

== Later developments ==
The new standards were twice taken to England and recompared with the imperial yard, in 1876 and in 1888. Measurable discrepancies were found ‘which could not reasonably be said to be entirely due to changes in No. 11. Suspicion as to the constancy of the length of the British standard was therefore aroused.'

In 1890, as a signatory of the Metre Convention, the US received two copies of the International Prototype Metre, the construction of which represented the most advanced ideas of standards of the time. Therefore it seemed that US measures would have greater stability and higher accuracy by accepting the international meter as fundamental standard, with the yard defined in terms of the meter. This was formalized in 1893 by the Mendenhall Order, with the conversion in accordance with the Metric Act of 1866 (as 1 meter = 39.37 inches, which corresponds to 1 inch = 2.5400051… centimeters). This value was adjusted in 1959 to its present value of 1 inch = 2.54 centimeters (or, 1 yard = 0.9144 meters), exactly.

== Location ==
As of 1965, the Troughton scale was stored in a case next to the Standards Vault at what was then the National Bureau of Standards (and is today NIST) in Washington, D.C.

== See also ==
- Ferdinand Rudolph Hassler
- Standard (metrology)
- Yard
- Mendenhall Order
- National Institute of Standards and Technology
- Metrology
