= NOAAS Ferdinand R. Hassler =

Coastal mapping twin hulled vessel

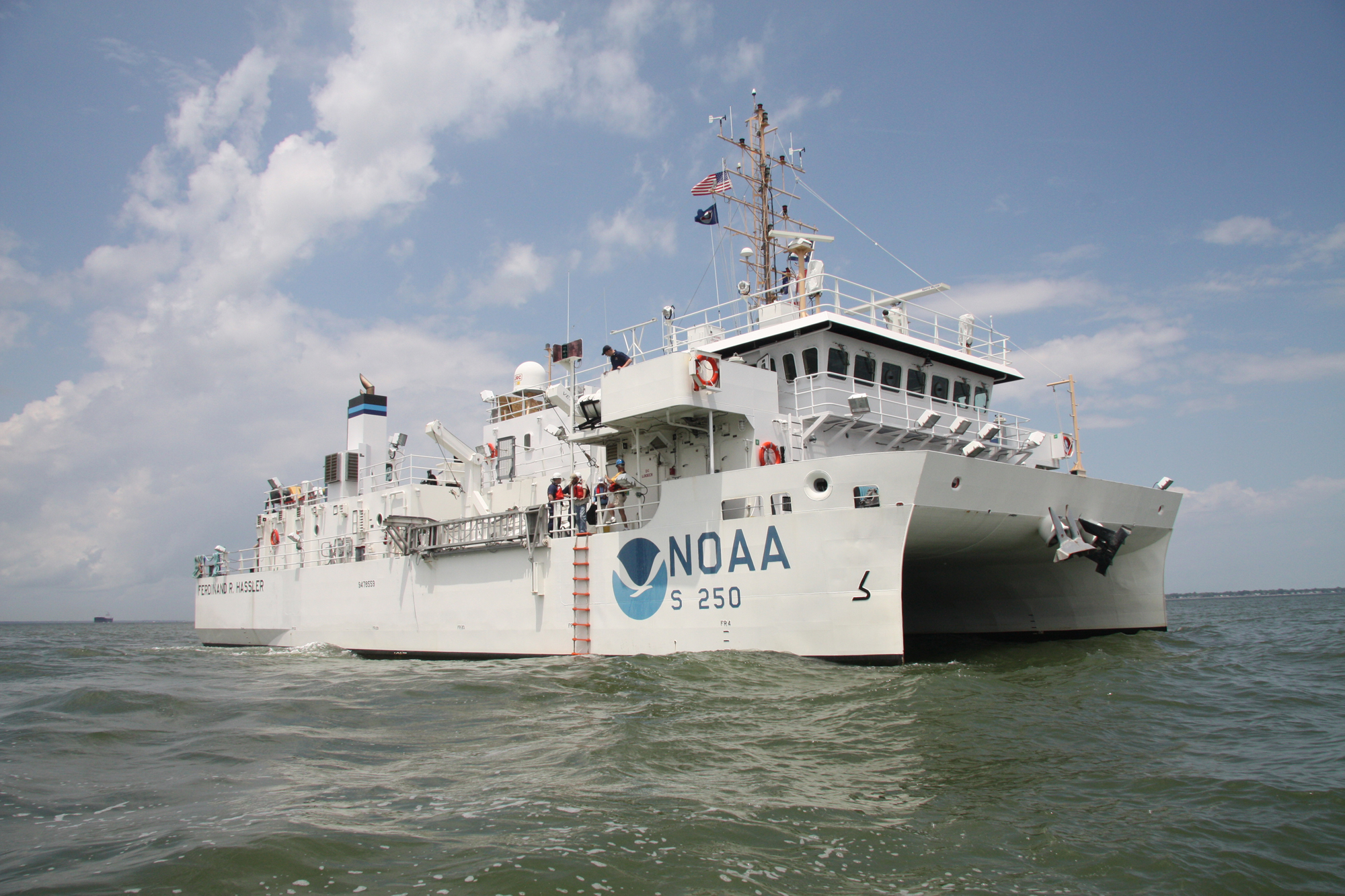
- NOAAS Ferdinand R. Hassler (S 250)

History

United States
- Name: Ferdinand R. Hassler
- Namesake: Ferdinand R. Hassler
- Owner: National Oceanic and Atmospheric Administration
- Builder: VT Halter Marine, Inc., Moss Point, Mississippi
- Cost: $22 million
- Laid down: June 2007
- Launched: 19 September 2009
- Commissioned: 8 June 2012
- Home port: New Castle, New Hampshire
- Identification: Hull number: S 250; Call letters: WTEK; IMO number: 9478559
- Status: Active in NOAA Atlantic Fleet

General characteristics
- Type: Coastal mapping vessel
- Tonnage: 809 t (892 short tons)
- Displacement: 738 t (814 short tons)
- Length: 37.7 m (124 ft)
- Beam: 18.5 m (61 ft)
- Draft: 3.8 m (12 ft)
- Speed: 12 kn
- Range: 2250 nmi

NOAAS Ferdinand R. Hassler (S 250) is a coastal mapping vessel for the National Oceanic and Atmospheric Administration. Commissioned on 8 June 2012, Ferdinand R. Hassler is one of the newest additions to the NOAA hydrographic charting fleet. Operating from the Great Lakes to the Gulf of Mexico, the ship's primary mission is hydrographic survey in support of NOAA's nautical charting mission. The ship's home port is New Castle, New Hampshire. It is named for Ferdinand Rudolph Hassler.

On 8 May 2015, Ferdinand R. Hassler completed a US$1 million overhaul at the United States Coast Guard Yard at Curtis Bay outside Baltimore, Maryland.
