= Ferdinand Rudolph Hassler =

Swiss-American surveyor (1770-1845)

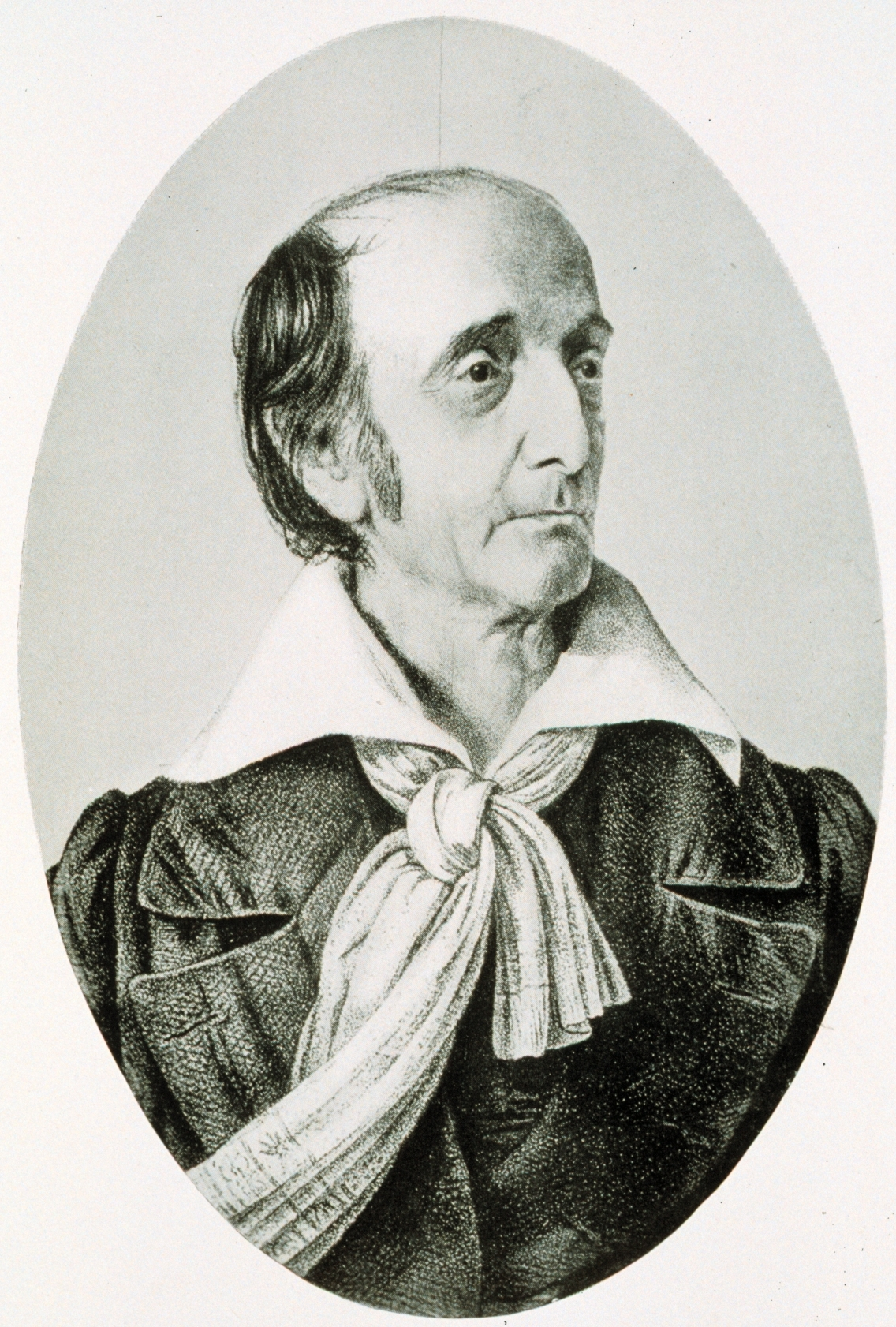
- Born: October 6, 1770; Aarau, Switzerland
- Died: November 20, 1843 (aged 73); Philadelphia, Pennsylvania, United States
- Resting place: Laurel Hill Cemetery
- Scientific career
- Fields: Surveyor
- Institutions: United States Military Academy; United States Coast Survey; United States Treasury Department

Ferdinand Rudolph Hassler (October 6, 1770 – November 20, 1843) was a Swiss-American surveyor who is considered the forefather of both the National Oceanic and Atmospheric Administration (NOAA) and the National Institute of Standards and Technology (NIST) for his achievements as the first Superintendent of the U.S. Survey of the Coast and the first U.S. Superintendent of Weights and Measures.

== Early life and education ==
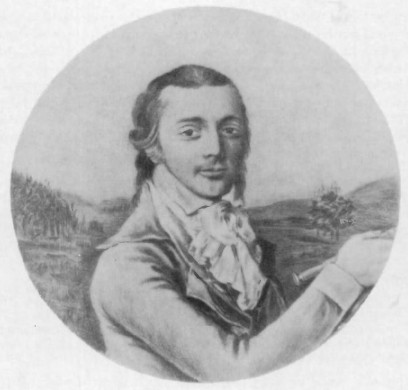
Ferdinand Hassler, ca. the 1790s.

Hassler was born on October 6, 1770 in Aarau, Switzerland. He was the son of Magdalena Ernst and Hans Jakob Hassler, a prosperous watchmaker and local official. He attended the Latin school and an advanced private school, then in 1786 the institute that later became the University of Bern. At first he studied law, but became a student of Johann Georg Tralles and changed his academic focus to astronomy, mathematics and physics. From 1791 to 1797 he continued his studies in France and Germany. In the summer of 1793, he studied under scientists Jean-Charles de Borda, Jean Baptiste Joseph Delambre, Jérôme Lalande and Antoine Lavoisier in Paris. He was employed on the trigonometrical survey of Switzerland before he emigrated to the United States in 1805.

== Career ==
He was elected a member of the American Philosophical Society on 17 April 1807. Through the influence of Albert Gallatin, he was appointed by President Thomas Jefferson as professor of mathematics at the United States Military Academy from 1807 to 1810. Hassler was unpopular as a teacher and was dismissed on 31 December 1809, when John Calhoun, then Secretary of War, realized that Congress had not authorized the hiring of civilians to staff the academy. Hassler obtained another mathematics professorship at Union College at Schenectady from 1810 to 1811.

=== U.S. coastal survey ===
In 1811, he was employed by the federal government of the United States to begin a hydrographic survey of the U.S. coast. An Act of Congress on February 10, 1807, appropriated $50,000 for the beginning of the work. In 1812, Hassler was appointed the superintendent of the Survey of the Coast by the United States Congress. He was sent to France and England to collect supplies for the project. Hassler bought instruments of the most reputed French and British makers. After the War of 1812 broke out between the United States and the United Kingdom in 1812, his instruments were confiscated as spoils of war and Hassler was detained in England until 1815 as the British thought him an enemy spy.

After Hassler's return to the United States, President James Madison appointed him the first superintendent of the Survey of the Coast in 1816. The creative side of Hassler was seen in the design of new surveying instruments. Most original was Hassler's baseline apparatus which involved an idea worked out by him in Switzerland and perfected in America. Instead of bringing different bars in actual contact during the process of baseline measurements, he used four two-metre (6 ft 7 in) iron bars fastened together totaling eight metres (26 ft) in length and optical contact. As early as February–March 1817, Hassler standardized the bars of his device which were actually calibrated on the Committee Metre (an authentic copy of the Mètre des Archives) which was the property of the American Philosophical Society, to whom it had been presented by Hassler himself, who had received it from Tralles, a foreign member of the French Committee charged with the construction of the standard metre by comparison with the Toise of Peru, which had served as unit of length in the measurement of the meridional arcs in France and Peru. The Committee Metre possessed all the authenticity of any original metre extant, bearing not only the stamp of the committee, but also the original mark by which it was distinguished from the other bars during the operation of standardising. Thus the metre became the unit of length for geodesy in the United States. Indeed, the Committee Metre served as the standard of length for Coast and Geodetic Survey until 1890, when the National Prototype Metre Bar No. 27 allotted to the United States in 1889 at the first General Conference on Weights and Measures arrived in Washington, D.C. However, Hassler had exceeded the spending limitations that had been set for his trip to Europe, and the resulting controversy foreshadowed the frictions between Hassler and the American Government that would plague his career. In 1818, the United States Congress removed Hassler from his role as superintendent of the Survey of the Coast and gave control to the United States Army, which remained in control until 1832.

On July 10, 1832, Congress reestablished the Survey of the Coast on the basis of the original act of 1807. Upon President Jackson's recommendation, Hassler again became its Superintendent. The Survey was renamed the United States Coast Survey in 1836, and in 1878 it became the United States Coast and Geodetic Survey.

=== Superintendent of weights and measures ===
Hassler also was able to continue his superintendence over the work in Weights and Measures. He became the head of the Office of Standard Weights and Measures (this office was a progenitor of the United States Bureau of Standards created by an Act of Congress on March 3, 1901) in the Treasury Department as an office within the Survey of the Coast which was reorganized in 1832, where he carried out the early work of establishing the standards of weights and measures in the United States, with the involvement of fellow Swiss immigrant Albert Gallatin, then ambassador of the United States at London, who in 1827 had brought from Europe a troy pound of brass, made at his request by Henry Kater, from which the standard of mass was derived. This troy pound called troy pound of the United States' Mint at Philadelphia or Pound Troy, 1824 was used as the standard for the coining of money until the twentieth century. The avoirdupoids pound adopted by Hassler had 7000 grains, the Pound Troy,1824 having 5760 grains.

In the autumn of 1829, Hassler was appointed as gauger in the New York Custom House. For some time Congress had been discussing the establishment of standard of weights and measure for the United States. Up to this time the various customhouses had worked independently of each other. They used separate weights and measures from wherever they could be obtained - most of them came from England - and in some cases the customhouses depended upon the ordinary standards of local officials. On 29 May 1829, the Senate decided a comparison of weights and measures used at customhouses. Five month later, President Andrew Jackson appointed Hassler United States gauger. With the approval of Secretary of the Treasury Samuel D. Ingham and President Jackson he determined to adopt standards for the United States and produce and distribute them to the customhouses. On 3 March 1831, Samuel D. Ingham reported to the President of the Senate Hassler's inspection far advanced and mentioned the Troughton scale as one of the authentic units adopted for the comparison. The Troughton scale was held to be identical with Bird's Standard Yard of 1760, which had been tested and deemed identical with the British Parliamentary Standard of 1758, which was destroyed in 1834. The fundamentals units of length, mass and capacity recommended by Hassler were adopted by the Treasury Department in 1832. Another meaningful national standard to be adopted in 1832 was the gallon at 231 cubic inches. Appraised by Treasury reports of Hassler's progress, Congress in a joint resolution of June 14, 1836, gave its formal approval and directed the Treasury to fabricate for the customhouses the standards of weights and measures established by Hassler. By reason of the joint resolution of 1836, the Office of Weights and Measures in the Coast Survey is considered formally established as of that date.

He was elected a member of the American Antiquarian Society in 1838.

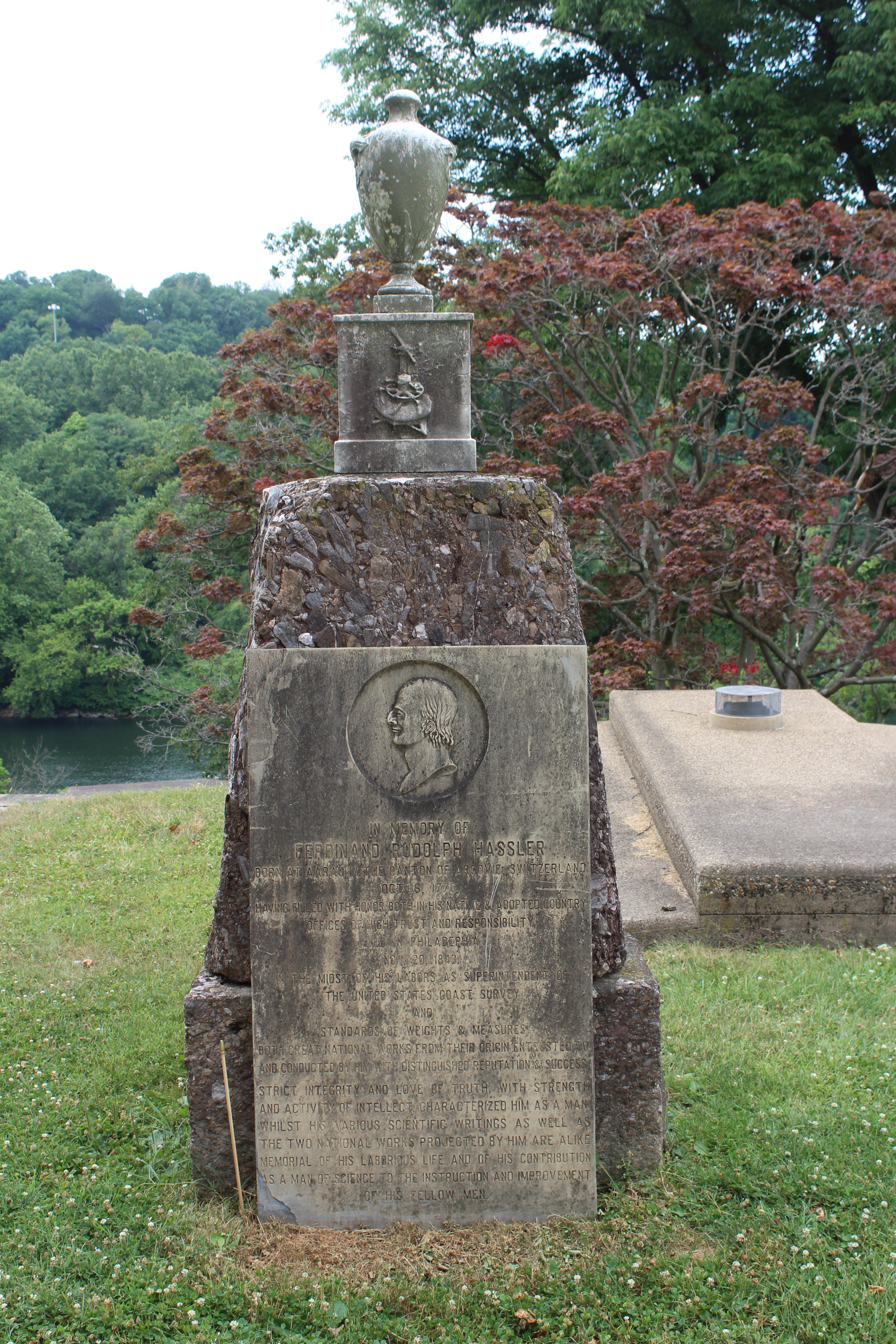
Ferdinand Rudolph Hassler memorial in Laurel Hill Cemetery in Philadelphia, Pennsylvania.

He died on November 20, 1843, and was interred in Laurel Hill Cemetery in Philadelphia.

== Legacy ==
The iron-hulled steamship Hassler, built in 1870, was named in his honor.

The National Oceanic and Atmospheric Administration survey ship NOAAS Ferdinand R. Hassler (S 250) also was named for Hassler.

Hassler's granddaughter, Mary Caroline Hassler Newcomb, married the noted astronomer and mathematician Simon Newcomb. Simon and Mary Caroline Hassler Newcomb were themselves the grandparents of the also much noted professor of mathematics, Hassler Whitney.

== Bibliography ==
Besides several textbooks of science, Hassler produced a publication in 1828 titled A Popular Exposition of the System of the Universe. After his 1818 dismissal from the United States Survey of the Coast, Hassler proved his worth as a theorist, publishing two influential books Elements of Analytical Trigonometry and Elements of Arithmetic Theoretical and Practical. He also wrote a defense of his work on the coast survey and published it in the Transactions of the American Philosophical Society in 1825.

Other publications:

- Extract from a Paper on Meteoric Stones, 1809
- A Popular Exposition of the System of the Universe, with Plates and Tables, New York, G & C Carvill, 1828
- Elements of Arithmetic, Theoretical and Practical; Adapted to the Use of Schools, and to Private Study, New York, James Bloomfield, 1826
- Elements of the Geometry of Planes and Solids: with Four Plates, Richmond, Shepherd & Co., 1828
- Logarithmic and Trigonometric Tables; to Seven Places of Decimals in a Pocket Form, New York, C. & G. & H. Cargill, 1830

== See also ==
- Fire Island
- History of the metre
- Metre
- Polyconic projection
- Seconds pendulum

Government offices
Preceded by none	Superintendent, United States Survey of the Coast; 1816–1818	Succeeded by none
Preceded by none	Superintendent of Weights and Measures ca. 1818–1843	Succeeded by Joseph Saxton
Preceded by none	Superintendent, United States Survey of the Coast; 1832–1836	Succeeded by none
Preceded by none	Superintendent, United States Coast Survey; 1836-1843	Succeeded by Alexander Dallas Bache
