= Bernard Ominayak =

Chief of the Lubicon Lake Nation (born 1950)

Chief Bernard Ominayak was born in 1950 at Lubicon Lake and is the Chief of the Lubicon Lake Indian Nation, Alberta, Canada.
