= Anita Newcomb McGee =

American physician (1864–1940)

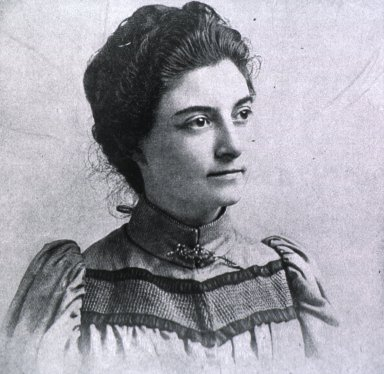
- Born: Anita Rosalie Newcomb; November 4, 1864; Washington, D.C., U.S.
- Died: October 5, 1940 (aged 75); Washington, D.C., U.S.
- Occupation: Medical doctor
- Known for: DAR Hospital Corps and Army Nurse Corps
- Spouse: William John McGee (m. 1888; died 1912)
- Children: 3

Anita Rosalie Newcomb McGee (born: Anita Rosalie Newcomb) (November 4, 1864 – October 5, 1940) was an American physician who is remembered for her work with the United States military.

== Early life and education ==
Anita Newcomb was born in Washington, D.C., the daughter of astronomer Simon Newcomb, a Steeves descendant. She married geologist and anthropologist W.J. McGee in 1888. Their oldest child, a daughter named Klotho, was born in 1889 and was primarily raised by a private nurse. Her second child, Donald died of meningitis at 9 months. Her youngest child, Eric Newcomb, was born in 1902.

Her sister, Josepha Newcomb Whitney studied at the Art Students' League in New York. She was known for her landscapes. She was active in the suffrage movement. She was chair of the Connecticut Women's Peace Party and President of the New Haven League of Women Voters. In 1912, she organized the first Cornwall meeting in support of voting rights for women. In 1922, she was the democratic candidate for state Senate.

McGee attended a private school in DC, graduating in 1882. She then traveled for three years, attending courses Newnham College, Cambridge England, University of Geneva, Switzerland.

McGee received her medical degree from Columbian College (present-day George Washington University) in 1892. Dr. McGee won the first prize in dermatology and stood second in clinical medicine at her examination. She followed this with a special post-graduate course in gynecology at Johns Hopkins University.

== Career ==
She was in private practice in Washington, D.C., from 1892 to 1896 and was one of few woman medical doctors practicing in the Washington area at that time. She also had connections with the military through her father, who held the rank of rear admiral.

As founder and Director of the DAR Hospital Corps, she trained volunteer nurses for army and navy service after the outbreak of the Spanish–American War in April 1898.

McGee's organizing ability led to her appointment as the only woman Acting Assistant Surgeon in the United States Army on August 29, 1898, and she was placed in charge of the Army's nurses under the Army Surgeon General's Department. After this brief war ended, McGee pursued the establishment of a permanent nursing corps, which became a reality with the Army Nurse Corps, after passage of the Army Reorganization Act legislation, which she helped draft. In 1900 she left her position with the Army, but continued leading the Society of Spanish–American War Nurses, a group she had founded in 1898. She led the effort to build the Spanish–American War Nurses Memorial at Arlington National Cemetery, which was dedicated on May 2, 1905.

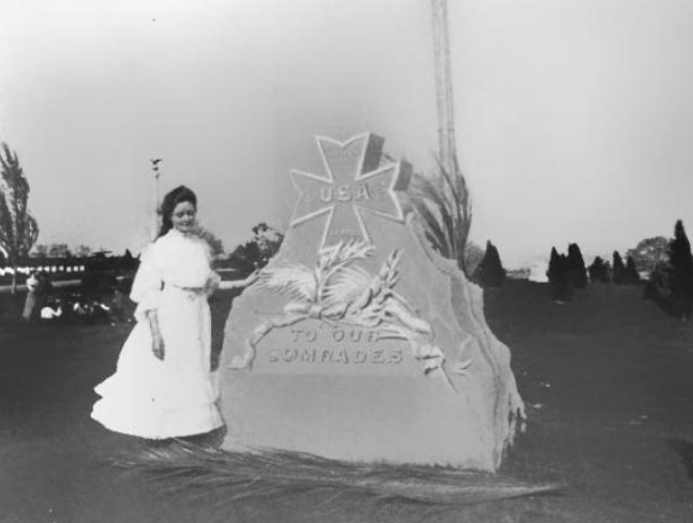
Miss Klotho McGee stands next to the Spanish American War Nurses Memorial after its unveiling in May 1905.

With the start of the Russo-Japanese War, McGee led a group of nine volunteer nurses to Japan, arriving in Yokohama in April 1904, and establishing a field hospital for the Imperial Japanese Army. The nurses included: Minnie Cooke, Mary E. Gladwin, Alice Kemmer, Ella B. King, Elizabeth R. Kratz, Adelaide Mackareth, Adele Neeb, Sophia Newell, and Genevieve Russell. Five came from the Red Cross Society of Philadelphia, the remainder from the Spanish–American War Nurses Society.

The Japanese Minister of War appointed McGee "Superior of Nurses," giving her rank on par with officers in the Japanese Army. She trained nurses from the Japanese Red Cross and in June 1904 toured the Japanese hospital ship Hakuai Maru. She also inspected the prisoner-of-war camp established by the Japanese in Matsuyama, Ehime Prefecture. In July, the medical team led by McGee crossed over to Korea and inspected field hospitals in Andong. The team returned to the United States in November 1904, but McGee remained as a military medical attaché and observer with the Japanese Army in Manchuria during 1905.

After her return to the United States, McGee lived in her homes in Woods Hole, Massachusetts, and Southern Pines, North Carolina, and in California, where she lectured at the University of California and wrote on her experiences in the war.

== Later life, death, and legacy ==
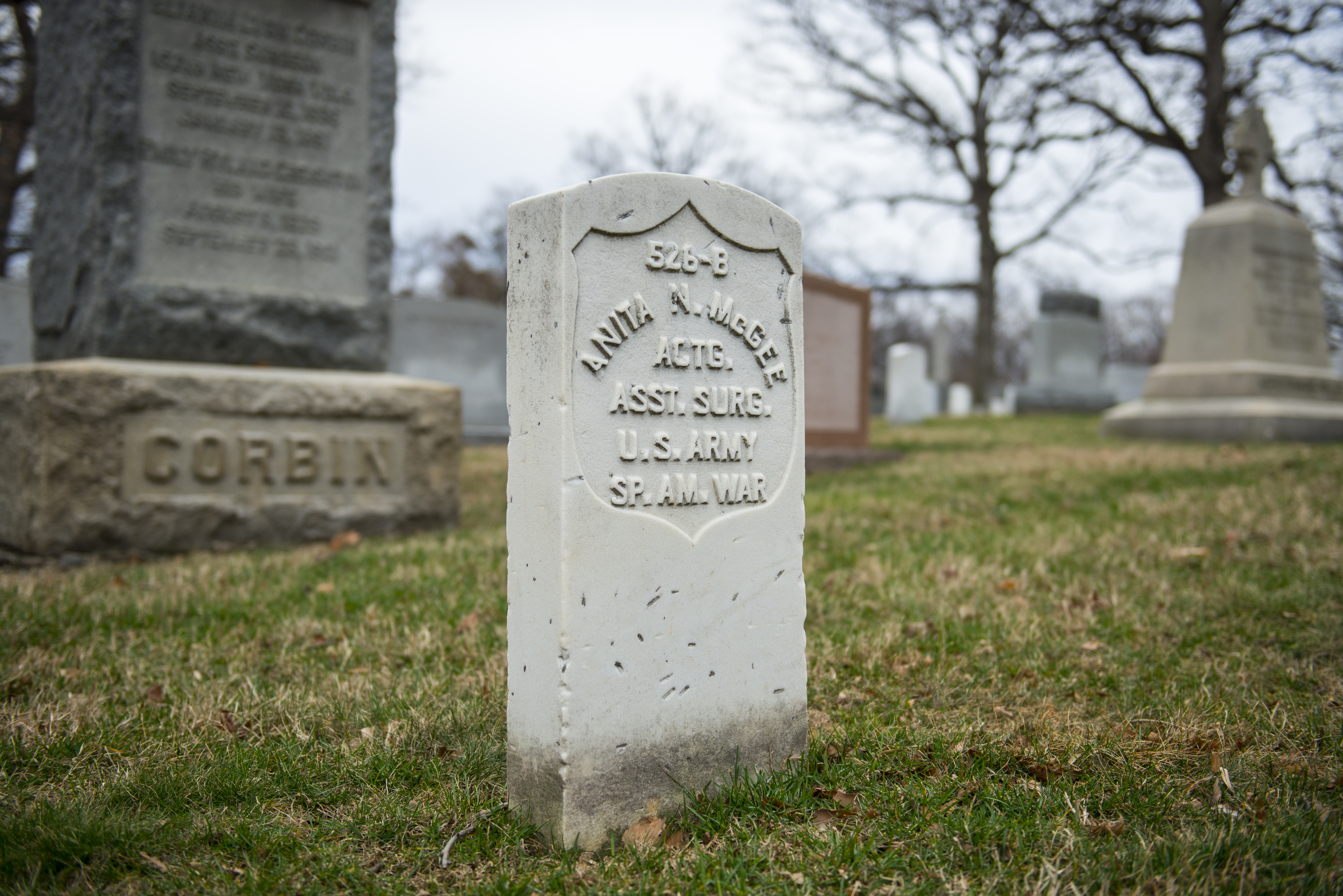
Grave at Arlington National Cemetery

McGee died on October 5, 1940, of a cerebral hemorrhage. She was buried at Arlington National Cemetery beside her father, with full military honors.

== Memberships ==
McGee was a member of the Daughters of the American Revolution and the United Spanish War Veterans. She was the founder of the Society of Spanish–American War Nurses.

== Awards ==
McGee received the Spanish War Service Medal from the U.S. Army for her services during the Spanish–American War. For her work in Japan, she was awarded the Japanese Imperial Order of the Precious Crown, the Silver Special Member's Badge of the Japanese Red Cross and two Russo-Japanese War medals from the Japanese government.

== Sources ==
- Kowner, Rotem (2006). Historical Dictionary of the Russo-Japanese War. Scarecrow. ISBN 0-8108-4927-5.
