= Lubicon Lake Indian Nation =

Cree First Nation in Alberta, Canada

Lubicon Lake Nation ᒪᐢᑯᑏᐤ ᓵᑲᐦᐃᑲᐣ Muskotew Sakahikan Enowuk
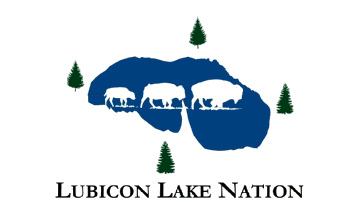
- Flag

- Location within Canada
- Country: Canada
- Province: Alberta
- Census division: Division No. 17

Government
  - Type: First Nations Council
  - Chief: Bernard Ominayak
- Time zone: UTC-7 (MST)
  - Summer (DST): UTC-6 (MDT)
- Postal code span: T8S 1S5
- Area code: 780
- Website: Lubicon Lake Nation Website

The Muskotew Sakahikan Enowuk or Lubicon Lake Nation (Cree: ᒪᐢᑯᑏᐤ ᓵᑲᐦᐃᑲᐣ) is a Cree First Nation in northern Alberta, Canada. They are commonly referred to as the Lubicon Lake Nation, Lubicon Cree, or the Lubicon Lake Cree. This should not be confused with the Lubicon Lake Band #453, which is a separate entity created by the Government of Canada by Order in Council in 1973.

== Lands claim dispute ==
The Nation has been embroiled with the Government of Canada regarding disputed land claims for decades. In 1899, a government party visited northern Alberta for the arranged large-scale surrender of the Lubicon lands. However, many of the Lubicon people were never contacted and continued to live in their traditional ways, by hunting and gathering on the land. During the oil rush of the 1970s, the province of Alberta leased areas of the Lubicon lands for resource exploration and exploitation. The oil, gas, and lumber industry on Lubicon territory has caused damaging repercussions on the natural environment, the Lubicon culture, and people. Amnesty International has commented on the struggle of the Lubicon by issuing a report imploring the Canadian government to respect the land rights of the Lubicon. The United Nations Commission on Human Rights has found Canada in violation of article 27 of the International Covenant on Civil and Political Rights. They have repeated their call for Canada to take immediate action to avoid irreparable damage. This call was first made by the UN Human Rights Committee in 1990 in a case known as Lubicon Lake Band v Canada, and was repeated in 2003 and 2006. The struggle has been described in a book, Last Stand of the Lubicon Cree, by John Goddard. Repeated attempts to gerrymander and politically overthrow Lubicon leadership, especially that led by internationally renowned Chief Bernard Ominayak, have been organized by the Government of Canada and the Province of Alberta, and documented by the Lubicon Lake Nation.

== Current chief and leadership issues ==
The current Chief of the Muskotew Sakahikan Enowuk or Lubicon Lake Nation is Chief Bernard Ominayak. The Treaty 8 Nations of Alberta do not recognize the Nation as an Indian Band.

Chief Bernard Ominayak has been the chief of the small First Nation since the 1970s. Prior to this, Chief Walter Whitehead served the Lubicon before stepping aside to allow Ominayak to run for the position. The Nation has 5 elected Councillors: Bryan Laboucan, Dwight Gladue, Cynthia Tomlinson, Dwight Sawan, and Larry Ominayak.

Since the 1980s, the Government of Canada has capitalised on divisions and dissent within the Nation and has recognised groups of dissenting Lubicons as new First Nations, such as the Woodland Cree First Nation and the Loon River Cree Nation. More recent attempts include attempts by Billy Joe Laboucan to create the Little Buffalo Cree Band in 1999 and 2004 following a failed election bid to lead the Lubicon Lake Nation. Steven Noskey led a similar dissenting council created in 2009. The Lubicon Lake Nation Council continued to be led by Chief Bernard Ominayak, who was unanimously re-elected and asked to hold the position "Chief for Life" by motion of the entire Lubicon membership in attendance; Ominayak refused. On the week of July 23, 2012, Noskey notified the Canadian government that he was stepping down, leaving Ominayak as the sole chief for the nation. This leadership resolution was ratified in writing by the majority of Lubicon citizens.

In 2015, the Lubicon Lake Nation Government held a by-election to fill the vacant seat left by long-time Councillor Alphonse Ominayak, who had died unexpectedly. Ominayak is remembered for his tireless work to protect Lubicon land, environment, and way of life in the face of massive oil and gas development. Ominayak additionally contributed greatly to the international human and indigenous rights work started by Chief Bernard Ominayak at the United Nations Human Rights Committee.

In the December 3, 2015 by-election, Cynthia Tomlinson became the first woman elected to the Government of the Lubicon Lake Nation Council. Tomlinson previously served as head of the Lubicon Lake Nation Youth Council and Lands & Negotiations Advisor to the Chief & Council. Tomlinson carries a bachelor's degree in Native American Studies from the University of Lethbridge. She is also an experienced public speaker on Indigenous rights and Indigenous legal orders, whose list of accomplishments include presenting at such institutions as the McGill Centre for Human Rights & Legal Pluralism and the University of Ottawa Faculty of Law.

== See also ==
- List of organizations that self-identify as FNIM governments
