= William John McGee =

Inventor, geologist, anthropologist and ethnologist (1853–1912)

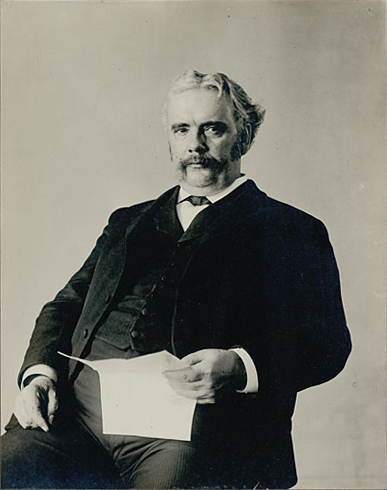
- McGee in 1900
- Born: April 17, 1853; Farley, Iowa, United States
- Died: September 4, 1912 (aged 59); Washington, DC, U.S.
- Spouse: Anita Newcomb McGee (m. 1888)
- Children: 3
- Scientific career
- Fields: Geology, anthropology, and ethnology

William John McGee, LL.D. (April 17, 1853 – September 4, 1912) was an American inventor, geologist, anthropologist, and ethnologist, born in Farley, Iowa. He always referred to himself as W J McGee, without periods.

== Biography ==
While largely self-taught, McGee attended a rural one-room schoolhouse north of Farley during the four winter months from about 1858 to 1867. He devoted his early years to reading law and to surveying. He invented and patented several improvements on agricultural implements.

He subsequently turned his attention to geology. In 1877–1881, he executed a topographic and geological survey of 17,000 square miles (44,030 km^{2}) in northeastern Iowa. He then undertook an examination of the loess of the Mississippi Valley, researched the great Quaternary lakes of Nevada and California and studied a recent fault movement in the middle Atlantic slope.

He was appointed geologist for the United States Geological Survey (USGS) in 1881. In 1884 McGee authored the article Map of the United States exhibiting the present status of knowledge relating to the areal distribution of geologic groups for the USGS Journal. While with the USGS, McGee travelled to Charleston, South Carolina, in 1886 for the purpose of studying the earthquake disturbances in its vicinity.

McGee was ethnologist in charge of the Bureau of American Ethnology from 1893 to 1903. In 1895, he explored the Isla del Tiburón, Gulf of California, home of the Seri Indians. In 1904 he was chief of the department of anthropology that organized the "Anthropology Days" at the 1904 Summer Olympics / Louisiana Purchase Exposition, the 1904 World's Fair. In 1907 he was appointed a member of the Inland Waterways Commission by President Roosevelt. His other prominent positions were: acting president of the American Association for the Advancement of Science (1897–1898); president of the American Anthropological Association (1902–1912); and president of the National Geographic Society (1904–1905).

McGee was also a founding member of the Geological Society of America and was the first editor of The Geological Society of America Bulletin, in 1890.

McGee married to Anita Newcomb McGee in 1888, and they had three children. He died in Washington, D.C., of cancer on September 4, 1912.

Mount McGee in California is named in his honor.

== Works ==
His publications include:

- The Geology of Chesapeake Bay (1888)
- The Pleistocene History of Northeastern Iowa (1889)
- The Siouan Indians (1895)
- Primitive Trephining (1897)
- The Seri Indians (1899)
- Primitive Numbers (1901)
- Soil Erosion (1911)
- Wells and Subsoil Water (1913)

Non-profit organization positions
Preceded by Alexander Graham Bell	President of the National Geographic Society; 1904–1905	Succeeded by Willis Luther Moore
