= Metre Convention =

1875 international standardization treaty

Metre Convention signatories: Member states / Associate states; Former member states / Former associate states

The Metre Convention (French: Convention du Mètre), also known as the Treaty of the Metre, is an international treaty that was signed in Paris on 20 May 1875 by representatives of 17 sovereign states: Argentina, Austria-Hungary, Belgium, Brazil, Denmark, France, Germany, Italy, Peru, Portugal, Russia, Spain, Sweden-Norway, Switzerland, the Ottoman Empire, the United States, and Venezuela.

The treaty created the International Bureau of Weights and Measures (BIPM), an intergovernmental organization, under the authority of the General Conference on Weights and Measures (CGPM) and the supervision of the International Committee for Weights and Measures (CIPM). These organizations coordinate international metrology and the development of internationally recognized systems of measurement.

The Metre Convention established a permanent organizational structure for member governments to act in common accord on all matters relating to units of measurement. The governing organs of the BIPM are:

- The General Conference on Weights and Measures (Conférence générale des poids et mesures or CGPM)—the plenary organ of the BIPM which consists of the delegates of all the contracting governments, and
- The International Committee for Weights and Measures (Comité international des poids et mesures or CIPM)—the direction and supervision organ composed of 18 prominent metrologists from 18 different member states

The headquarters or secretariat of the BIPM is at Saint-Cloud, France. It employs around 70 people and hosts BIPM's formal meetings.

Initially the scope of the Metre Convention covered only units of mass and length. In 1921, at the sixth meeting of the CGPM, convention was amended to its scope to other fields in physics. In 1960, at the eleventh meeting of the CGPM, its system of units was named the International System of Units (Système international d'unités, abbreviated SI).

The Metre Convention provides that only nations can be members of the BIPM. In 1999, the CGPM created in the status of associate, to allow non-member states and economic entities to participate in some activities of the BIPM through their national metrology institutes (NMIs).

As of 16 October 2024, the CGPM had 64 members and 37 associates.

Membership in the CGPM requires payment of substantial fees. Failure to make these payments over a span of years has led to the expulsion of some former members.

== Background ==
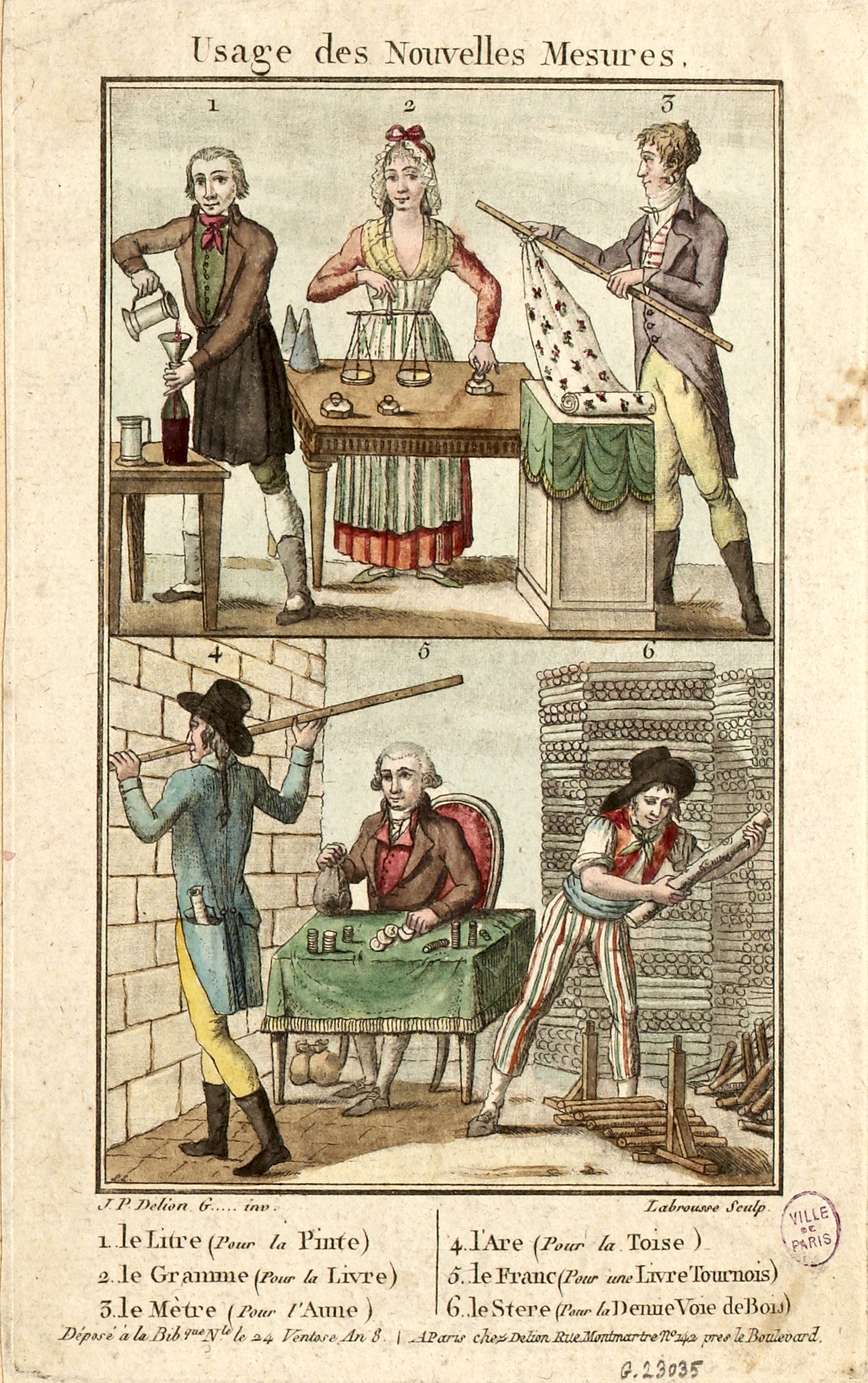
Woodcut dated 1800 illustrating the new decimal units which became the legal norm across all France on 4 November 1800

Before the French Revolution, which started in 1789, French units of measurement were based on the Carolingian system, introduced by the first Holy Roman Emperor Charlemagne (800–814 AD) which in turn were based on ancient Roman measures. Charlemagne brought a consistent system of measures across the entire empire. However, after his death, the empire fragmented and many rulers introduced their own variants of the units of measure.

Some of Charlemagne's units of measure, such as the pied du Roi (the king's foot) remained virtually unchanged for about a thousand years, while others, such as the aune (ell – used to measure cloth) and the livre (pound) varied dramatically from locality to locality. By the time of the revolution, the number of units of measure had grown to the extent that it was almost impossible to keep track of them.

In England in 1215, clause 25 of Magna Carta required that the same standards of measurement be applied throughout the realm. The wording of the clause emphasized that "There is to be a single measure ... throughout our realm". Five centuries later, when in 1707 England and Scotland were united into a single kingdom, the Scots agreed to use the same units of measure that were already established in England. During the eighteenth century, in order to facilitate trade, Peter the Great, Czar of Russia adopted the English system of measure.

From 1668 to 1776 the French standard of length was the Toise of Châtelet which was fixed outside the Grand Châtelet in Paris. In 1735 two geodetic standards were calibrated against the Toise of Châtelet. One of them, the Toise of Peru was used for the French Geodesic Mission to the Equator. In 1766 the Toise of Peru became the official standard of length in France and was renamed Toise of the Academy (French: Toise de l'Académie).

Profusion of units of measures was a practical problem of importance before the French Revolution and its reform was one of the items on the agenda of National Assembly. In 1799, after the remeasurement of the Paris meridian arc (French: Méridienne de France) between Dunkirk and Barcelona by Delambre and Mechain, the metre was defined as a quarter of a 10-millionth of the Earth circumference or 3 pieds (French feet) and 11.296 lignes (lines) of the Toise of the academy. Talleyrand, an influential leader of the Assembly invited British and American participation in the establishment of a new system, but in the event, the Assembly went it alone and introduced the metre and the kilogram which were to form the basis of the metric system, manufacturing prototypes which, in 1799, were lodged with Archives.

Between 1840 and 1870, a number of countries definitively adopted the metric system as their system of measure including France, Spain, many South American republics and many of the Italian and German states (the Netherlands had adopted the system in 1817).

In 1863, the International Postal Union used grams to express permitted weights of letters. In the 1860s, inspections of the prototype metre revealed wear and tear at the measuring faces of the bar and also that the bar was wont to flex slightly when in use.

== Cartography and the metre ==
The American Revolution, in which the United States was supported by France and Spain, led to the founding of the Survey of the Coast in 1807 and the creation of the Office of Standard Weights and Measures in 1830. During the mid-19th century, the metre was adopted in Khedivate of Egypt an autonomous tributary state of the Ottoman Empire for cadastral surveying. In continental Europe, adoption of the metric system and a better standardisation of units of measurement marked the Technological Revolution, a period in which German Empire would challenge United Kingdom as the foremost industrial nation in Europe. This was accompanied by development in cartography which was a prerequisite for both military operations and the creation of the infrastructures needed for industrial development such as railways. During the process of unification of Germany, geodesists called for the establishment of an International Bureau of Weights and Measures in Europe.

=== Swiss, American, Spanish and Egyptian cartography ===
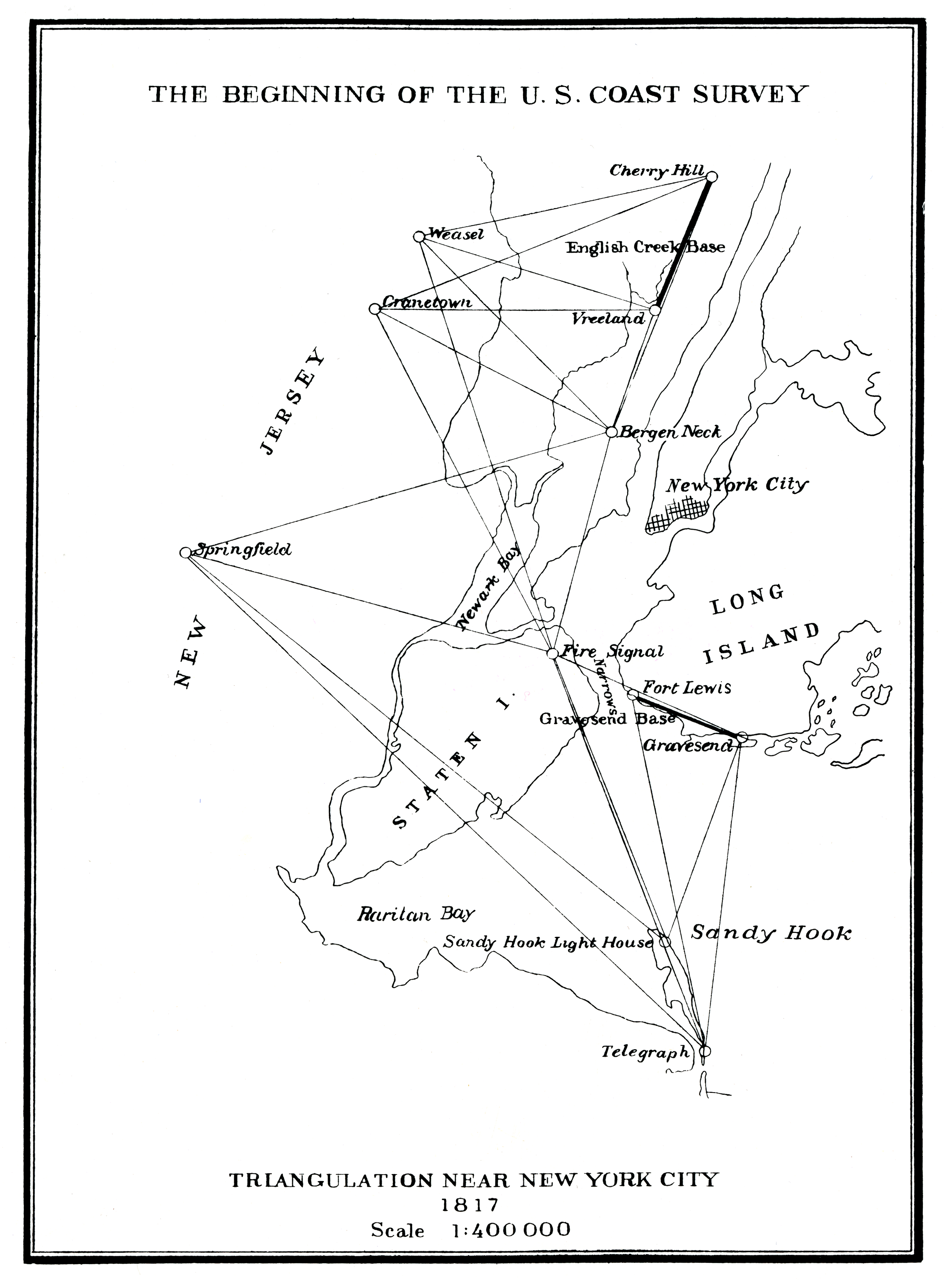
Triangulation near New York City, 1817

The Helvetic Republic adopted the metric system by law in 1801. In 1805, a Swiss immigrant Ferdinand Rudolph Hassler brought copies of the French metre and kilogram to the United States. In 1830 the Congress decided to create uniform standards for length and weight in the United States. Hassler was mandated to work out the new standards and proposed to adopt the metric system. The United States Congress opted for the British Parliamentary Standard Yard of 1758 and the British Troy Pound of 1824 as length and weight standards. Nevertheless, Ferdinand Rudolph Hassler's use of the metre and the creation of the Office of Standard Weights and Measures as an office within the Coast Survey contributed to the introduction of the Metric Act of 1866 allowing the use of the metre in the United States.

In 1816, Ferdinand Rudolph Hassler was appointed first Superintendent of the Survey of the Coast. Trained in geodesy in Switzerland, France and Germany, Hassler had brought a standard metre made in Paris to the United States in October 1805. He designed a baseline apparatus which instead of bringing different bars in actual contact during measurements, used only one bar calibrated on the Committee meter, an authenthic copy of the Mètre des Archives, and optical contact. In 1830, Hassler became head of the Office of Weights and Measures, which became a part of the Survey of the Coast. He compared various units of length used in the United States at that time and measured coefficients of expansion to assess temperature effects on the measurements. In 1834, Hassler, measured at Fire Island the first baseline of the Survey of the Coast, shortly before Louis Puissant declared to the French Academy of Sciences in 1836 that Jean Baptiste Joseph Delambre and Pierre Méchain had made errors in the meridian arc measurement, which had been used to determine the length of the metre.

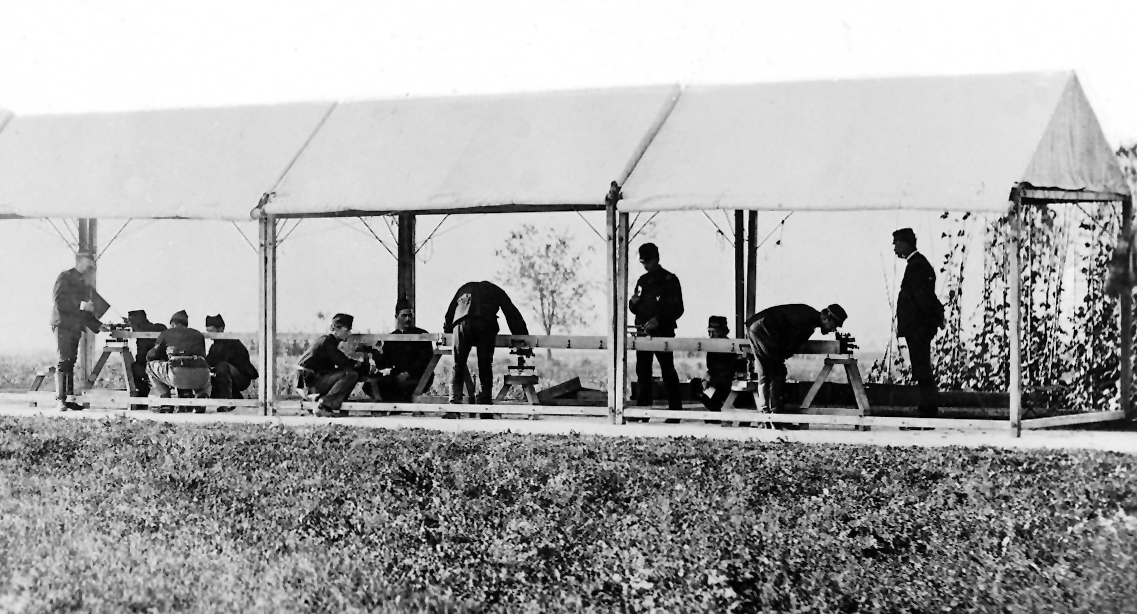
Ibáñez apparatus calibrated on the metric Spanish standard and used at Aarberg, in canton of Bern, Switzerland in 1880.

In 1855, the Dufour map (French: Carte Dufour), the first topographic map of Switzerland for which the metre was adopted as the unit of length, won the gold medal at the Exposition Universelle. However, the baselines for this map were measured in 1834 with three toises long measuring rods calibrated on a toise made in 1821 by Jean Nicolas Fortin for Friedrich Georg Wilhelm von Struve. The Spanish standard, a geodetic measuring device calibrated on the metre devised by Carlos Ibáñez e Ibáñez de Ibero and Frutos Saavedra Meneses, was also displayed by Jean Brunner at the Exhibition. Carlos Ibáñez e Ibáñez de Ibero recognized that the end standards with which the most perfect devices of the eighteenth century and those of the first half of the nineteenth century were still equipped, that Jean-Charles de Borda or Friedrich Wilhelm Bessel simply joined measuring the intervals by means of vernier callipers or glass wedges, would be replaced advantageously for accuracy by microscopic measurements, a system designed in Switzerland by Ferdinand Rudolph Hassler and Johann Georg Tralles, and which Ibáñez ameliorated using a single standard with lines marked on the bar. Regarding the two methods by which the effect of temperature was taken into account, Ibáñez used both the bimetallic rulers, in platinum and brass, which he first employed for the central base of Spain, and the simple iron ruler with inlaid mercury thermometers which was used by the Swiss Geodetic Commission. On the sidelines of the Exposition Universelle (1855) and the second Congress of Statistics held in Paris, an association with a view to obtaining a uniform decimal system of measures, weights and currencies was created in 1855. Under the impetus of this association, a Committee for Weights and Measures and Monies (French: Comité des poids, mesures et monnaies) would be created during the Exposition Universelle (1867) in Paris and would call for the international adoption of the metric system.

Egyptian astronomy has ancient roots which were revived in the 19th century by the modernist impetus of Muhammad Ali who founded in Sabtieh, Boulaq district, in Cairo an Observatory which he was keen to keep in harmony with the progress of this science still in progress. In 1858, a Technical Commission was set up to continue cadastral surveying inaugurated under Muhammad Ali. This Commission suggested to Viceroy Mohammed Sa'id Pasha to buy geodetic devices which were ordered in France. While Mahmud Ahmad Hamdi al-Falaki was in charge, in Egypt, of the direction of the work of the general map, the viceroy entrusted to Ismail Mustafa al-Falaki the study, in Europe, of the precision apparatus calibrated against the metre intended to measure the geodesic bases and already built by Jean Brunner in Paris. Ismail Mustafa had the task to carry out the experiments necessary for determining the expansion coefficients of the two platinum and brass bars, and to compare the Egyptian standard with a known standard. The Spanish standard designed by Carlos Ibáñez e Ibáñez de Ibero and Frutos Saavedra Meneses was chosen for this purpose, as it had served as a model for the construction of the Egyptian standard. In addition, the Spanish standard had been compared with Borda's double-toise N° 1, which served as a comparison module for the measurement of all geodesic bases in France, and was also to be compared to the Ibáñez apparatus. In 1954, the connection of the southerly extension of the Struve Geodetic Arc with an arc running northwards from South Africa through Egypt would bring the course of a major meridian arc back to land where Eratosthenes had founded geodesy.

=== European geodesy ===
In Europe, except Spain, surveyors continued to use measuring instruments calibrated on the Toise of Peru. Among these, the toise of Bessel and the apparatus of Borda were respectively the main references for geodesy in Prussia and in France. These measuring devices consisted of bimetallic rulers in platinum and brass or iron and zinc fixed together at one extremity to assess the variations in length produced by any change in temperature. The combination of two bars made of two different metals allowed to take thermal expansion into account without measuring the temperature. A French scientific instrument maker, Jean Nicolas Fortin, made three direct copies of the Toise of Peru, one for Friedrich Georg Wilhelm von Struve, a second for Heinrich Christian Schumacher in 1821 and a third for Friedrich Wilhelm Bessel in 1823. In 1831, Henri-Prudence Gambey also realised a copy of the Toise of Peru which was kept at Altona Observatory in Hamburg.

In the second half of the 19th century, the creation of the Central European Arc Measurement (German: Mitteleuropäische Gradmessung) would mark, following Carl Friedrich Gauss, Friedrich Wilhelm Bessel and Friedrich Georg Wilhelm von Struve examples, the systematic adoption of more rigorous methods among them the application of the least squares in geodesy. It became possible to accurately measure parallel arcs, since the difference in longitude between their ends could be determined thanks to the invention of the electrical telegraph. Furthermore, advances in metrology combined with those of gravimetry have led to a new era of geodesy. If precision metrology had needed the help of geodesy, the latter could not continue to prosper without the help of metrology. It was then necessary to define a single unit to express all the measurements of terrestrial arcs and all determinations of the gravitational acceleration by means of pendulum.

In 1866, an important concern was that the Toise of Peru, the standard of the toise constructed in 1735 for the French Geodesic Mission to the Equator, might be so much damaged that comparison with it would be worthless, while Bessel had questioned the accuracy of copies of this standard belonging to Altona and Koenigsberg Observatories, which he had compared to each other about 1840. In fact, the length of Bessel's Toise, which according to the then legal ratio between the metre and the Toise of Peru, should be equal to 1.9490348 m, would be found to be 26.2·10^{−6} m greater during measurements carried out by Jean-René Benoît at the International Bureau of Weights and Measures. It was the consideration of the divergences between the different toises used by geodesists that led the European Arc Measurement (German: Europäische Gradmessung ) to consider, at the meeting of its Permanent Commission in Neuchâtel in 1866, the founding of a World Institute for the Comparison of Geodetic Standards, the first step towards the creation of the International Bureau of Weights and Measures. Spain joined the European Arc Measurement at this meeting. In 1867 at the second General Conference of the European Arc Measurement held in Berlin, the question of international standard of length was discussed in order to combine the measurements made in different countries to determine the size and shape of the Earth. The conference recommended the adoption of the metric system (replacing Bessel's toise) and the creation of an International Metre Commission.

=== Saint Petersburg Academy ===
Ferdinand Rudolph Hassler's metrological and geodetic work also had a favourable response in Russia. In 1869, the Saint Petersburg Academy of Sciences sent to the French Academy of Sciences a report drafted by Otto Wilhelm von Struve, who secured, in 1860, the co-operation of Prussia, Belgium, France and England to the measurement of the European arc of parallel in 52° latitude, Heinrich von Wild, the Swiss born director of the Central Geophysical Observatory in Saint Petersburg, and Moritz von Jacobi, whose theorem has long supported the assumption of an ellipsoid with three unequal axes for the figure of the Earth, inviting his French counterpart to undertake joint action to ensure the universal use of the metric system in all scientific work. The French Academy of Sciences and the Bureau des Longitudes in Paris drew the attention of the French government to this issue. In November 1869, Napoleon III issued invitations to join the International Metre Commission in Paris.

=== The International Metre Commission (1870/1872) ===
Prior to the 1870 conference, French politicians had feared that the British might reject the existing metre and would prefer to have new value of its theoretical length. However, James Clerk Maxwell wrote in 1865 that no scientist could become famous proposing a metre deduced from new measurements of the size of the Earth, while Adolphe Hirsch would recall, in his 1891 obituary of Carlos Ibáñez e Ibáñez de Ibero, that the International Metre Commission had decided not to propose a new length for the metre.

In July 1870, two weeks before the conference was due to start, the Franco-Prussian War broke out. Although the delegates did meet (without a German delegation), it was agreed that the conference should be recalled once all the delegates (including the German delegation) were present. Following the war, which resulted in Napoleon III's exile, Germany and Italy, now unified nations, adopted the metric system as their national system of units, but with the prototype copy of the kilogram and metre under the control of the French Third Republic. In 1872 the new republican government reissued the invitations and the same year scientists from thirty European and American countries met in Paris.

When the International Metre Commission was reconvened in 1872, it was proposed that new prototype metre and kilogram standards be manufactured to reproduce the values of the existing artifacts as closely as possible. Indeed, since its origin, the metre had kept a double definition; it was both the ten-millionth part of the quarter meridian and the length represented by the Mètre des Archives. The first was historical, the second was metrological. There was much discussion, considering the opportunity either to keep as definitive the units represented by the metre and kilogram standards of the Archives, or to return to the primitive definitions, and to correct the units to bring them closer to them. The first solution prevailed, in accordance with common sense and in accordance with the advice of the French Academy of Sciences. Abandoning the values represented by the standards, would have consecrated an extremely dangerous principle, that of the change of units to any progress of measurements; the Metric System would be perpetually threatened with change, that is to say with ruin. Thus the Commission called for the creation of a new international prototype metre which length would be as close as possible to that of the Mètre des Archives and the arrangement of a system where national standards could be compared with it.

The representation of the unit of length by means of the distance between two fine lines on the surface of a bar of metal at a certain temperature is never itself free from uncertainty and probable error, owing to the difficulty of knowing at any moment the precise temperature of the bar; and the transference of this unit, or a multiple of it, to a measuring bar will be affected not only with errors of observation, but with errors arising from uncertainty of temperature of both bars. If the measuring bar be not self-compensating for temperature, its expansion must be determined by very careful experiments. Careful comparisons with several standard toises showed that the Mètre des Archives was not exactly equal to the legal metre or 443.296 lines of the toise of Peru, but, in round numbers, 1/(75 000) of the length smaller, or approximately 0.013 millimetres. The metre according to the older relation is called the “legal metre,” according to the new relation the “international metre.” The legal metre is about 0.2 millimetres shorter than it should be according to its original proposed definition. The official length of the Mètre des Archives was based on the Arc measurement of Delambre and Méchain, but the definitive length of the metre required a value for the non-spherical shape of the Earth, known as the flattening of the Earth. Wrong assuption of flattening of the Earth ellipsoid accounted for 3% of the error in the length of the metre and the length of the meridian arc as measured by Delambre and Méchain contributed for less than 2% of the total error, while 95% of the missing length of the legal metre was due to not taking the effect of vertical deflection into account. Despite the precision of their survey, the definition of the metre was beyond Delambre and Méchain's reach as gravity anomalies had not yet been studied.

=== The 1874 metre-alloy ===
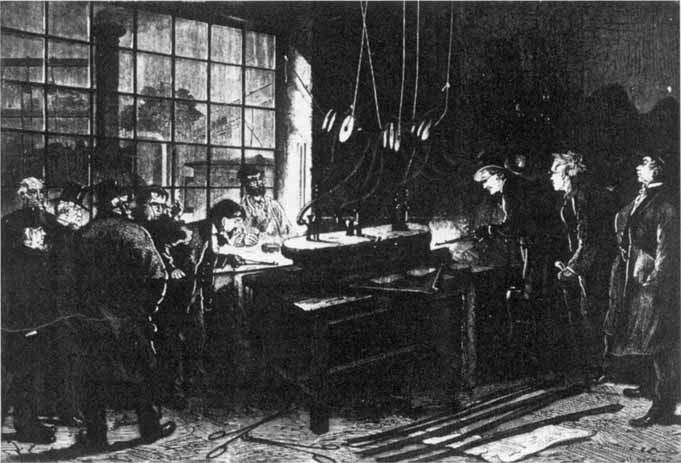
Preparing the first metre-alloy in May 1874, at the Conservatoire des Arts et Métiers, Paris

On 6 May 1873 during the 6th session of the French section of the Metre Commission, Henri Étienne Sainte-Claire Deville cast a 20-kilogram platinum-iridium ingot from Matthey in his laboratory at the École normale supérieure (Paris). On 13 May 1874, 250 kilograms of platinum-iridium to be used for several national prototypes of the metre was cast at the Conservatoire national des arts et métiers. When a conflict broke out regarding the presence of impurities in the metre-alloy of 1874, a member of the Preparatory Committee since 1870 and president of the Permanent Committee of the International Metre Commission, Carlos Ibáñez e Ibáñez de Ibero intervened with the French Academy of Sciences to rally France to the project to create an International Bureau of Weights and Measures equipped with the scientific means necessary to redefine the units of the metric system according to the progress of sciences. In fact, the chemical analysis of the alloy produced in 1874 by the French section revealed contamination by ruthenium and iron which led the International Committee for Weights and Measures to reject, in 1877, the prototypes produced by the French section from the 1874 alloy. It also seemed at the time that the production of prototypes with an X profile was only possible through the extrusion process, which resulted in iron contamination. However, it soon turned out that the prototypes designed by Henri Tresca could be produced by milling.

== The 1875 conferences in Paris ==
The principal tasks facing the delegates at the 1875 Diplomatic Conference on the Metre was the replacement of the existing metre and kilogram artefacts that were held by the French Government and the setting up of an organization to administer the maintenance of standards around the globe. The conference did not concern itself with other units of measure. The conference had undertones of Franco-German political manoeuvring, particularly since the French had been humiliated by the Prussians during the war a few years previously. Although France lost control of the metric system, they ensured that it passed to international rather than German control and that the international headquarters were in Paris.

While the German astronomer Wilhelm Julius Foerster along with the Russian and Austrian representatives had boycotted the Permanent Committee of the International Metre Commission in order to prompt the reunion of the Diplomatic Conference of the Metre and to promote the foundation of a permanent International Bureau of Weights and Measures, Adolphe Hirsch, delegate of Switzerland at this Diplomatic Conference in 1875, conformed to the opinion of Italy and Spain to create, in spite of French reluctance, the International Bureau of Weights and Measures in France as a permanent institution at the disadvantage of the Conservatoire national des arts et métiers.

In 1875, the Permanent Commission of the European Arc Measurement would also hold its reunion in Paris and decide the creation of an international geodetic standard for baselines' measurement calibrated against the metre. French Empire had hesitated for a long time before giving in to the demands of the European Arc Measurement, which asked the French geodesists to take part in its work. It was only after the Franco-Prussian War, that Charles-Eugène Delaunay represented France at the Congress of Vienna in 1871. In 1874, Hervé Faye was appointed member of the Permanent Commission of the European Arc Measurement presided by Carlos Ibáñez e Ibáñez de Ibero who was collaborating with the French on the extension and remeasurement of the meridian arc of Delambre and Méchain since 1853.

Spain notably supported France for these outcomes and the first president of the International Committee for Weights and Measures, the Spanish geodesist, Carlos Ibáñez e Ibáñez de Ibero received the Grand Officer medal of the Légion d'Honneur for his diplomatic role on this issue and was awarded the Poncelet Prize for his scientific contributions to metrology and geodesy. Indeed, Carlos Ibáñez e Ibáñez de Ibero, first president of the International Geodetic Association, played a pivotal role in reconciling French and German interests.

=== Reference standards ===
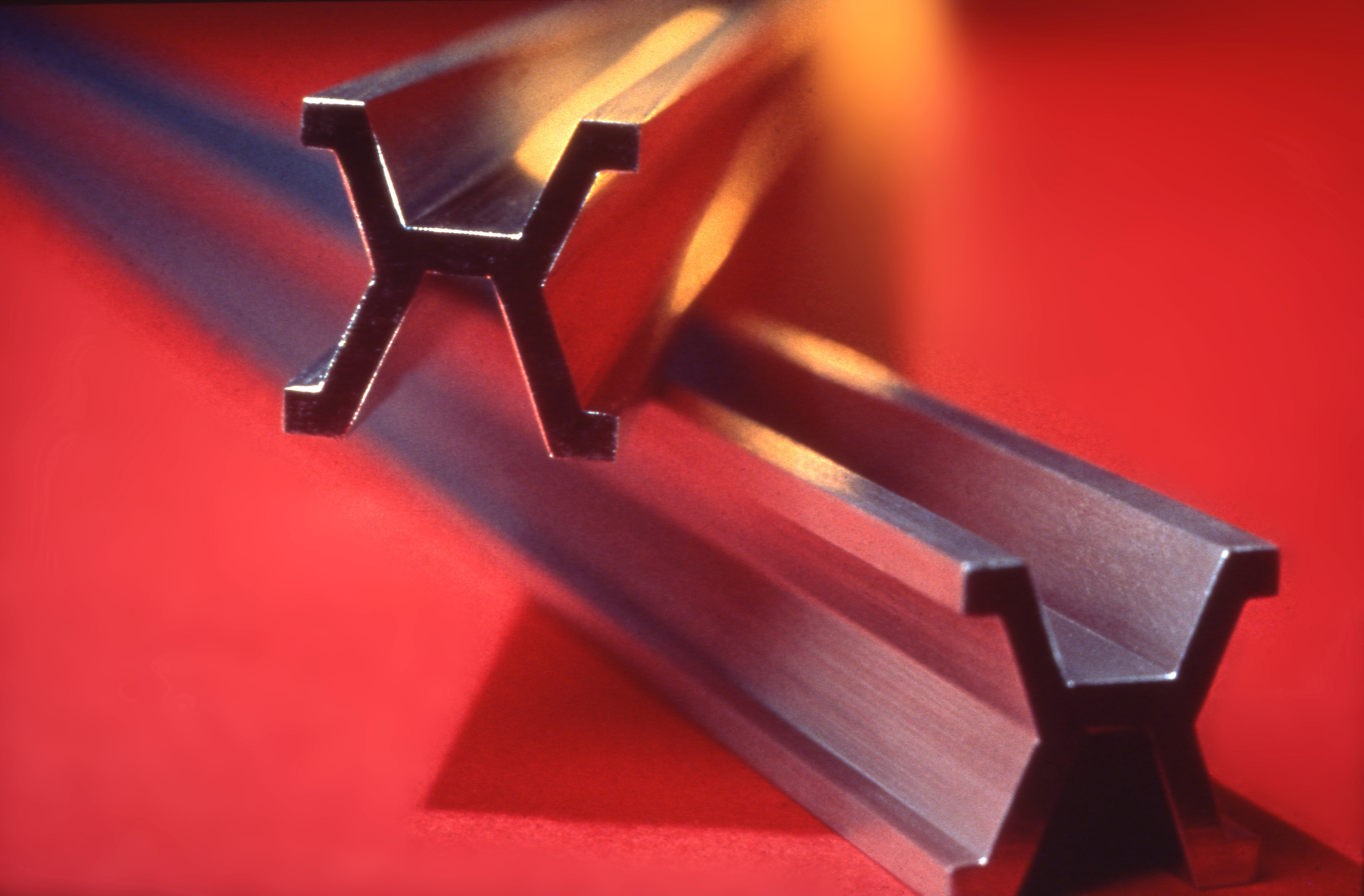
Historical international prototype of the metre, made of an alloy of platinum and iridium, that was the standard from 1889 to 1960.

Although the new standard metre had the same value as the old metre, it had an "X" cross-section designed by Henri Tresca rather than a rectangular cross-section as this reduced the flexing when taking measurements. Moreover, the new bar, rather than being exactly one metre in length was a little longer than one metre and had lines engraved on them that were exactly one metre apart. The London firm Johnson Matthey delivered 30 prototype metres and 40 prototype kilograms. At the first meeting of the CGPM in 1889 bar No. 6 and cylinder No. X were chosen by lot as the international prototypes. The remainder were either kept as BIPM working copies or distributed by lot to member states as national prototypes.

The comparison of the new prototypes of the metre with each other involved the development of special measuring equipment and the definition of a reproducible temperature scale. The BIPM's thermometry work led to the discovery of special alloys of iron–nickel, in particular invar, whose practically negligible coefficient of expansion made it possible to develop simpler baseline measurement methods, and for which its director, the Swiss physicist Charles Édouard Guillaume, was granted the Nobel Prize in Physics in 1920. Guillaume's Nobel Prize marked the end of an era in which metrology was leaving the field of geodesy to become an autonomous scientific discipline capable of redefining the metre through technological applications of physics. On the other hand, the foundation of the United States Coast and Geodetic Survey by Ferdinand Rudolph Hassler paved the way to a new definition of the metre, with Charles Sanders Peirce being the first to experimentally link the metre to the wavelength of a spectral line. Albert A. Michelson soon took up the idea and improved it.

The prototype metre was retained as the international standard until 1960 when the metre was redefined in terms of the wavelength of the orange-red line of krypton-86. The current definition of the metre is "the length of the path travelled by light in vacuum during a time interval of 1/299792458 of a second".

On 16 November 2018, the 26th General Conference on Weights and Measures (CGPM) voted unanimously in favour of revised definitions of some SI base units, in particular the kilogram. The new definitions came into force on 20 May 2019, but did not change the metre.

=== International organization ===
The Convention created an international organization with two governing organs to facilitate the standardization of weights and measures around the world. The first, the CGPM provides a forum for representative of member states, the second, the CIPM is an advisory committee of metrologists of high standing. The Secretariat or Headquarters provides appropriate meeting and laboratory facilities in support of the CGPM and CIPM.

The structure may be compared to a corporation, the CIPM is analogous to a board of directors, and the CGPM to a shareholders' meeting.

==== General Conference on Weights and Measures ====
The General Conference on Weights and Measures (Conférence générale des poids et mesures or CGPM) is the principal decision-making body put on place by the convention. It is made up of delegates from member states and [non-voting] observers from associate states and economies. The conference usually meets every four years to receive and discuss a report from the CIPM and to endorse new developments in the SI on the advice of the CIPM though at the 2011 meeting, it agreed to meet again in 2014 rather than 2015 to discuss the maturity of the new SI proposals. It is also responsible for new appointments to the CIPM and decides on major issues concerning the development and financing of the BIPM. According to the Metre Convention (Art. 4) the President of the French Academy of Sciences is also the President of the General Conference on Weights and Measures.

==== International Committee for Weights and Measures ====
Seal of the BIPM

The International Committee for Weights and Measures (Comité international des poids et mesures or CIPM) is made up of eighteen (originally fourteen) individuals from a member state of high scientific standing, nominated by the CGPM to advise the CGPM on administrative and technical matters. It is responsible for the running of ten consultative committees (CCs), each of which investigates different aspects of metrology – one CC discusses the measurement of temperature, another the measurement of mass and so on. The CIPM meets annually at Saint-Cloud to discuss annual reports from the various CCs, to submit an annual report to the governments of member states in respect of the administration and finances of the BIPM and to advise the CGPM on technical matters as and when necessary. Each member of the CIPM is from a different member state – with France, in recognition of its work in setting up the convention, always having one seat on the CIPM.

==== Secretariat of the BIPM ====
The Secretariat (or Headquarters) of the International Bureau of Weights and Measures (Bureau international des poids et mesures or BIPM) is based at Saint-Cloud, France. It has custody of the now historical international prototype of the kilogram and provides metrology services for Member States and hosts formal meetings. It also has custody of the former international prototype of the metre which was retired in 1960. Over the years the various prototypes of the metre and of the kilogram were returned to the BIPM laboratories for recalibration services.

Initially it had a staff of 9, falling to 4 once the initial batch of prototypes had been distributed; in 2012 it had a staff of over 70 people and an annual budget of over €10 million. The director of the BIPM is ex-officio a member of the CIPM and a member of all consultative committees.

=== Headquarters, language and protocol ===
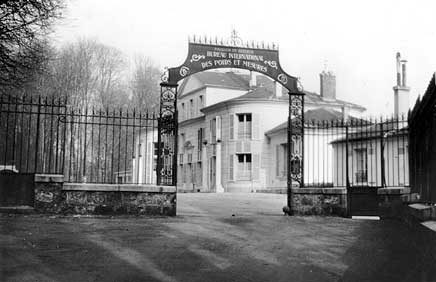
The Pavillon de Breteuil in Saint-Cloud, Paris

The original treaty was written in French and the authoritative language of all official documents is French. Communication between the BIPM and member states is, in the case of France, via the French Foreign Minister and in the case of all other members, via the members' ambassador to France.

The French government offered the treaty members the Pavillon de Breteuil in Saint-Cloud to house the BIPM. The Pavillon was originally built in 1675 on the estate of the Château de Saint-Cloud which was home to, amongst others, Emperor Napoleon III. The château was all but destroyed during the Franco-Prussian War (1870–1) and the Pavillon badly damaged. The Pavillon has been fully restored and, as headquarters of an intergovernmental organization enjoys privileges and immunities.

== Post-1875 developments ==
The science of metrology has progressed vastly since 1875. In particular the treaty was amended in 1921 with the result that many other international organizations have a forum within the CIPM to ensure harmonization of measurement standards across many disciplines. In addition, what were originally conceived as standards for the purposes of trade have now been extended to cover a large number of aspects of human activity including medicine, science, engineering and technology.

=== Extensions to the treaty (1921) and development of the SI ===
The metre convention was originally drawn up with the main purpose of providing standards of length and mass only. Standards relating to other quantities were under the control of other bodies – time was measured by astronomers, electrical units by a series of ad-hoc international conferences, and other physical standards and concepts were maintained or defined by international bodies such as International Congress of Applied Chemistry or the International Union of Pure and Applied Physics.

In 1901 Giorgi published a proposal for building a coherent set of units based on four base units – the metre, kilogram, second and one electrical unit (ampere, volt or ohm). In 1921 the convention was extended to permit the promotion of standards relating to any physical quantity which greatly increased the scope of the CIPM's remit and implicitly giving it freedom to exploit Giorgi's proposals. The 8th CGPM (1933) resolved to work with other international bodies to agree to standards for electrical units that could be related back to the international prototypes. This was agreed in principle by the International Electrotechnical Commission at its congress in Brussels in 1935 subject to the choice of the fourth unit being agreed with, amongst others, the appropriate consultative committee of the CIPM.

In 1948, three years after the end of World War II and fifteen years after the 8th CGPM, the 9th CGPM was convened. In response to formal requests made by the International Union of Pure and Applied Physics and by the French Government to establish a practical system of units of measure, the CGPM requested the CIPM to prepare recommendations for a single practical system of units of measurement, suitable for adoption by all countries adhering to the Metre Convention. At the same time the CGPM formally adopted a recommendation for the writing and printing of unit symbols and of numbers. The recommendation also catalogued the recommended symbols for the most important MKS and CGS units of measure and for the first time the CGPM made recommendations concerning derived units.

The CIPM's draft proposal, which was an extensive revision and simplification of the metric unit definitions, symbols and terminology based on the MKS system of units, was put to the 10th CGPM in 1954. In the proposal the CIPM recommended that the ampere be the base unit from which electromechanical standards would be derived. After negotiations with the CIS and IUPAP, two further base units, the degree kelvin and the candela were also proposed as base units. The full system and name "Système international d'unités" were adopted at the 11th CGPM. During the years that followed the definitions of the base units and particularly the mise en pratique to realize these definitions have been refined.

The formal definition of International System of Units (SI) along with the associated resolutions passed by the CGPM and the CIPM are published by the BIPM on the Internet and in brochure form at regular intervals. The eighth edition of the brochure Le Système international d'unités – The International System of Units was published in 2006.

=== Mutual Recognition Arrangements (CIPM-MRA) ===
Logo used by laboratories that have been accredited under the CIPM MRA scheme

During the 1940s, the United States government recognized the benefits of its suppliers keeping quality control records in respect of manufactured goods that would provide traceability of the process. This process was formalized by the British Government and in 1979 as the quality control standard BS 5750. In 1987 BS 5750 was adopted by ISO as the basis for ISO 9000. ISO 9000 is a general purpose quality control standard which works in conjunction industry-specific standards: for example ISO 15195:2003 which gives the specific requirements for reference measurement laboratories in laboratory medicine.

International trade is hampered by one country not recognising the quality controls in place in other countries – often due to standards being different or being incompatible with each other. At the 20th CGPM (1995), it was recognized that although ad-hoc recognition of instrument calibration between cooperating countries had been taking place for a hundred years, a need had arisen for a more comprehensive agreement. Consequently, the CIPM was mandated to investigate the setting up of a Mutual Recognition Agreement in respect of instrument calibration. Any such agreement would require the keeping of records that could demonstrate the traceability of calibrations back to the base standards. Such records would be recorded within an ISO 9000 framework. Four years later, in 1999 the text of the CIPM-MRA was agreed at the 21st CGPM.

The CIPM-MRA scheme is to catalogue the capabilities of National Measurement Institutes (NMIs) such as NIST in the United States or the National Physical Laboratory in Britain whose calibration procedures have been peer-assessed. The essential points of CIPM-MRA are:

- The agreement is only open to countries that have signed the Metre Convention, either as full or as associate members.
- A country may have more than one NMI, though only one NMI is chosen as the signatory organization.
- The measurement capabilities of NMIs will be peer-reviewed at regular intervals and each NMI will recognize the measurement capabilities of other NMIs.
- The BIPM maintains a publicly available database of the measurement capabilities of each NMI.
- NMIs

Subsequent to launch of the CIPM MRA and in response to a European Community directive on in vitro medical devices, the Joint Committee for Traceability in Laboratory Medicine (JCTLM) was created in 2002 through a Declaration of Cooperation between the International Committee of Weights and Measures (CIPM), the International Federation of Clinical Chemistry and Laboratory Medicine (IFCC), and the International Laboratory Accreditation Cooperation (ILAC). The joint committee provides a forum for the harmonization of standards of the various participants.

=== Coordination of International Atomic Time ===
With the advent of the atomic clock it has been possible to define and measure International Atomic Time with sufficient precision that variations in the Earth's rotation can be detected. The International Earth Rotation Service monitors these changes relative to the stars at regular intervals and proposes leap seconds as and when these are needed. Currently there are over 200 atomic clocks in over 50 national laboratories around the world and the BIPM, in terms of the mandate given to it under the Metre Convention, coordinates the various atomic clocks.

=== New SI ===
Relations between 2019 definitions of SI units (in colour) and with seven fundamental constants of nature (in grey) with fixed numerical values.

After 1960, when the definition of the metre was linked to a particular wavelength of light rather than the international prototype of the metre, the only unit of measure that remained dependent on a particular artefact was the kilogram. Over the years, small drifts which could be as high as 20×10^{−9} kilograms per annum in the mass of the international prototype of the kilogram were detected. At the 21st meeting of the CGPM (1999), national laboratories were urged to investigate ways of breaking the link between the kilogram and a specific artefact.

Independently of this drift having been identified, the Avogadro project and development of the Kibble (or watt) balance promised methods of indirectly measuring mass with a very high precision. These projects provided tools that enabled alternative means of redefining the kilogram.

A report published in 2007 by the Consultative Committee for Thermometry to the CIPM noted that their definition of temperature had proved to be unsatisfactory for temperatures below 20 K and for temperatures above 1300 K. The committee was of the view that the Boltzmann constant provided a better basis for temperature measurement than did the triple point of water, as it overcame these difficulties.

Over the next few years the support for natural constants grew and details were clarified, until in November 2018, the 26th General Conference on Weights and Measures voted unanimously in favour of revised definitions of the SI base units. The 2019 revision of the SI came into force on the 144th anniversary of the convention, 20 May 2019.

== Membership ==
The BIPM has two classes of adherents – full membership for those states that wish to participate in the activities of the BIPM and associate membership for those countries or economies (Note: As of 2012, the only "economy" that was an associate member was CARICOM (Caribbean Community) – its membership comprising Antigua and Barbuda, Saint Kitts and Nevis, Barbados, Saint Lucia, Belize, Saint Vincent and the Grenadines, Dominica, Suriname, Grenada, Trinidad and Tobago and Guyana. Jamaica, although also a member of CARICOM, is an associate of the CGPM in its own right.) that only wish to participate in the MRA programme. Associate members have observer status at the CGPM. Since all formal liaison between the convention organizations and national governments is handled by the member state's ambassador to France, (Note: In the case of France, the French Foreign Minister) it is implicit that member states must have diplomatic relations with France, though during both world wars, nations that were at war with France retained their membership of the CGPM. The opening session of each CGPM is chaired by the French foreign minister and subsequent sessions by the president of the French Academy of Sciences.

On 20 May 1875 representatives from seventeen of countries that attended the Conference of the Metre in 1875, signed the Convention of the Metre. (Note: Argentina, Austria-Hungary, Belgium, Brazil, Denmark, France, German Empire, Italy, Peru, Portugal, Russia, Spain, Sweden and Norway, Switzerland, Ottoman Empire, United States and Venezuela.) In April 1884 HJ Chaney, Warden of Standards in London unofficially contacted the BIPM inquiring whether the BIPM would calibrate some metre standards that had been manufactured in Britain. Broch, director of the BIPM replied that he was not authorized to perform any such calibrations for non-member states. On 17 September 1884, the British Government signed the convention. This number grew to 21 in 1900, 32 in 1950, and 49 in 2001. As of 16 October 2024, the General Conference membership was made up of 64 member states, 37 associate states and economies and four international organizations as follows (with year of partnership between brackets):

=== Member states ===
Name	Year of partnership	Notes
Argentina	1877	
Australia	1947	
Austria	1875	Joined originally as Austria-Hungary
Belarus	2020	Belarus was previously an Associate member since 2003
Belgium	1875	
Brazil	1921	
Bulgaria	1911	
Canada	1907	
Chile	1908	
China	1977	
Colombia	2013	
Costa Rica	2022	
Croatia	2008	Joined originally as Austria-Hungary in 1875, as the Kingdom of Yugoslavia in 1929
Czech Republic	1922	Joined originally as part of Czechoslovakia
Denmark	1875	
Ecuador	2019	Ecuador was previously an Associate member since 2000
Egypt	1962	
Estonia	2021	
Finland	1923	
France	1875	
Germany	1875	Joined originally as the German Empire
Greece	2001	
Hungary	1925	
India	1957	
Indonesia	1960	
Iran	1975	
Iraq	2013	
Ireland	1925	Joined originally as the Irish Free State
Israel	1985	
Italy	1875	
Japan	1885	
Kazakhstan	2008	
Kenya	2010	
Lithuania	2015	
Malaysia	2001	
Mexico	1890	
Montenegro	2018	
Morocco	2019	
Netherlands	1929	
New Zealand	1991	
Norway	1875	Joined originally as part of Sweden and Norway
Pakistan	1973	
Poland	1925	
Portugal	1876	
Romania	1884	
Russian Federation	1875	Joined originally as the Russian Empire
Saudi Arabia	2011	
Serbia	1879	Joined as the Principality of Serbia in 1879, as the Kingdom of Yugoslavia in 1929, and as the Federal Republic of Yugoslavia in 2001
Singapore	1994	
Slovakia	1922	Joined originally as part of Czechoslovakia
Slovenia	2016	Joined originally as Austria-Hungary in 1875, as the Kingdom of Yugoslavia in 1929
South Africa	1964	
South Korea	1959	
Spain	1875	
Sweden	1875	Joined originally as part of Sweden and Norway
Switzerland	1875	
Thailand	1912	
Tunisia	2012	
Turkey	1875	Joined originally as the Ottoman Empire
Ukraine	2018	
United Arab Emirates	2015	
United Kingdom	1884	
United States	1878	
Uruguay	1908	

=== Associates ===
At its 21st meeting (October 1999), the CGPM created the category of "associate" for those states not yet members of the BIPM and for economic unions.

Country	Year of partnership	Notes
Albania	2007	
Azerbaijan	2015	
Bangladesh	2010	
Bolivia	2008	
Bosnia and Herzegovina	2011	
Botswana	2012	
Cambodia	2005	
Caribbean Community	2005	
Chinese Taipei	2002	
Cuba	2000	Suspended during 1 January 2022 – 15 October 2024
Ethiopia	2018	
Georgia	2008	
Ghana	2009	
Hong Kong	2000	
Jamaica	2003	
Kuwait	2018	
Latvia	2001	
Luxembourg	2014	
Malta	2001	
Mauritius	2010	
Republic of Moldova	2007	
Mongolia	2013	
Namibia	2012	
North Macedonia	2006	Joined as Macedonia
Oman	2012	
Panama	2003	
Paraguay	2009	
Peru	2009	
Philippines	2002	
Qatar	2016	
Sri Lanka	2007	
Syria	2012	
Tanzania	2018	
Uzbekistan	2018	
Vietnam	2003	
Zambia	2010	
Zimbabwe	2010	Suspended during 1 January 2021 – 8 February 2022

=== International organizations ===
The following international organizations have signed the CIPM MRA:

- International Atomic Energy Agency (IAEA), Vienna, Austria (1999)
- Institute for Reference Materials and Measurements (IRMM), Geel, Belgium (1999)
- World Meteorological Organization (WMO), Geneva, Switzerland (2010)
- European Space Agency (ESA), Paris, France (2012)

=== Former member states ===
The following former members were excluded from the organization following failure to pay their arrears over a span of years and upon failing to provide any form of payment plan:

- Cameroon was a member state from 1970 until 22 October 2012.
- North Korea was a member state from 1982 until 2012
- Dominican Republic was a member state from 1954 until 31 December 2014.
- Venezuela was a member state from 1879 until 14 November 2018.
- Yemen was an associate from 21 July 2014 until 1 January 2018.
- Seychelles was an Associate from 10 September 2010 to 31 December 2021.
- Sudan was an Associate from 26 June 2014 to 31 December 2021.

== See also ==
- Outline of metrology and measurement
- Metrication
- History of the metre
- Seconds pendulum
- Swiss Geodetic Commission
- World Metrology Day
