= Ismail Mustafa al-Falaki =

Egyptian astronomer (1825–1901)

- Born: 1825; Cairo, Ottoman Egypt
- Died: July 27, 1901 (aged 76); Helwan, Khedivate of Egypt
- Education: Muhandiskhana; Paris Observatory
- Known for: Founding and directing the Abbassia Observatory (1865); publishing modern astronomical ephemerides and Islamic calendar calculations in Egypt; establishing early Egyptian meteorological observation networks
- Title: Ismail Pasha al-Falaki
- Scientific career
- Fields: Astronomical observation, magnetic surveying, meteorological recording, calendar standardization

Ismail Mustafa, Ismail Effendi Mustafa, Ismail Bey Mustapha, Ismail Mustafa al-Falaki or Ismail Pasha al-Falaki (1825 – 27 July 1901) was an Egyptian astronomer and mathematician. Effendi, Bey and Pasha corresponded to the different ranks he attained along his career; "al-Falaki" was added to his name literally meaning "the astronomer". He was born in Cairo to a family of Turkish origin and was educated in Paris, France.

== Scientific career ==
Egyptian astronomy has ancient roots which were revived in the 19th century by the modernist impetus of Muhammad Ali who founded in Sabtieh, Boulaq district, in Cairo an Observatory which he was keen to keep in harmony with the progress of this science still in progress. The staff at this establishment were recruited from among the best students of the Boulaq École polytechnique (Polytechnic), headed by Charles Joseph Lambert, a French engineer. Thus, Ismail Mustafa entered the Observatory after his technical studies.

Charles Joseph Lambert, wanting to give greater impetus to the intellectual movement which was germinating in the country and to respond to the aspirations of Viceroy Abbas I, easily obtained the sovereign's acquiescence to the sending to Europe, in 1850, of three young engineers chosen from among the best graduates of the Bulaq École polytechnique. Mahmoud Hamdi (Mahmoud Pasha al-Falaki), Ismail Mustafa and Hussein Ibrahim were appointed to complete their studies in France.

Mahmoud and Ismail devoted themselves to the in-depth study of astronomy, and through their erudition public favor forever bestowed upon them the title of al-Falaki (the astronomer).

After completing his practical and theoretical studies Ismail Mustafa had the special mission of taking care of the construction of astronomical instruments, in order to be able to ensure, in the future, the perfect functioning and possible repair of the Egyptian Observatory's devices. To this end, he devoted himself for an entire year to the study of the construction and repair of precision instruments in Brunner's workshops in Paris.

In 1858, a Technical Commission was set up to continue, by adopting the procedures instituted in Europe, the cadastral work, inaugurated by means of the Kassaba, under Muhammad Ali. This Commission suggested to Viceroy Mohammed Sa'id Pasha the idea of building geodetic devices which were ordered in France.

While Mahmoud al-Falaki was in charge, in Egypt, of the direction of the work of the general map, the viceroy entrusted to Ismail the study, in Europe, of the precision apparatus calibrated against the metre intended to measure the geodesic bases and already built by Jean Brunner in Paris. Ismail Mustafa had the task to carry out the experiments necessary for determining the expansion coefficients of the two platinum and brass rules, and to compare Egyptian standard with a known standard. The Spanish standard designed by Carlos Ibáñez e Ibáñez de Ibero and Frutos Saavedra Meneses was chosen for this purpose, as it had served as a model for the construction of the Egyptian standard. In addition, the Spanish standard had been compared with Borda's double-toise N° 1, which served as a comparison module for the measurement of all geodesic bases in France.

On the return of Ismail Mustafa to Egypt, after 14 years of stay in Europe, the Khedive Isma'il Pasha taking into consideration the wise advice suggested by Urbain Le Verrier to his predecessor to put Boulaq Observatory on the same level as similar establishments in Europe, instructed him to set up a new observatory, which was established in 1868 at Abbassia, and would later be transferred to Helwan, in 1903. Ismail Mustafa al-Falaki took charge of the Abbassia Observatory which became the Khedival Observatory.

In 1873 Ismail Mustafa was delegated to the International Statistical Congress in Moscow, where the Tsar conferred on him the rank of Commander in the Imperial Order of Saint Anna.

In 1883 he was appointed director of the École polytechnique. He was also appointed director of the School of Land Surveying, he founded. He taught cosmography, geodesy and astronomy at the Military Academy and in the two schools he directed.

He was the author of books in Arabic including an elementary treatise on astronomy and the first volume of a long-term work on the same subject and geodesy. He retired in 1886. Until his death he published Arabic almanacs and European calendars on behalf of the Egyptian state.

In 1899, he was conferred the insignia of Grand Officer in the Imperial Order of the Medjidie.

== Legacy ==
Egypt was, after the United States of America and Spain in Europe, the first country in Africa to use a geodetic standard calibrated against the metre. The history of the metre reveals that it was then chosen as an international scientific unit of length by the European Arc Measurement which would later become the International Association of Geodesy. The inspiration for the creation of this association came to Johann Jacob Baeyer following the measurement of the geodetic arc of Struve.

In 1954, the connection of the southerly extension of the Struve Arc with an arc running north from South Africa through Egypt brought the course of a major meridian arc back to land where Eratosthenes had founded geodesy.

== Bibliography ==
- Goldschmidt, Arthur (2000), Biographical dictionary of modern Egypt, Lynne Rienner Publishers, ISBN 1-55587-229-8
- Reid, Donald Malcolm (2003), Whose pharaohs?: archaeology, museums, and Egyptian national identity from Napoleon to World War I, University of California Press, ISBN 0-520-24069-3
- Stolz, Daniel A, The Lighthouse and the Observatory - Islam, Science, and Empire in Late Ottoman Egypt, Cambridge University Press. Online publication date: December 2017, Print publication year: 2018. Online ISBN 9781108164672
