= Carlos Ibáñez =

Carlos Ibáñez may refer to:

- Carlos Ibáñez e Ibáñez de Ibero (1825–1891), Spanish general and geodesist
- Carlos Ibáñez del Campo (1877–1960), Chilean Army officer and political figure
- Carlos Ibáñez (Spanish footballer) (1912–1942), Spanish footballer
- Carlos Ibáñez (Chilean footballer) (1930–2015), Chilean football forward
