= Carlos Ibáñez e Ibáñez de Ibero =

Spanish marquis, general, and geodesist (1825–1891)

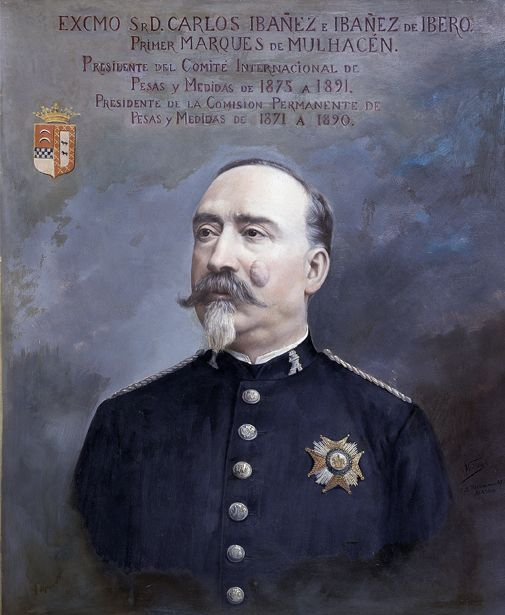
- Portrait of Carlos Ibáñez e Ibáñez de Ibero in 1881
- Born: 14 April 1825; Barcelona (Spain)
- Died: 28 or 29 January 1891; Nice (France)
- Resting place: Cimetière du Château in Nice
- Known for: President of the International Committee for Weights and Measures (1875–1891)
- Awards: Poncelet Prize
- Scientific career
- Fields: Geodesy, Geography, Metrology, Statistics.
- Workplaces: Instituto Geográfico Nacional (Spain) International Association of Geodesy International Statistical Institute

Carlos Ibáñez e Ibáñez de Ibero, 1st Marquis of Mulhacén, (14 April 1825 – 28 or 29 January 1891) was a Spanish divisional general and geodesist. He represented Spain at the 1875 Conference of the Metre Convention and was the first president of the International Committee for Weights and Measures. As a forerunner geodesist and president of the International Geodetic Association, he played a leading role in the worldwide dissemination of the metric system. His activities resulted in the distribution of a platinum and iridium prototype of the metre to all States parties to the Metre Convention during the first meeting of the General Conference on Weights and Measures in 1889. These prototypes defined the metre right up until 1960.

He was born in Barcelona. According to Spanish tradition, his surname was a combination of his father's first surname, Martín Ibáñez y de Prado and of his mother's first surname, Carmen Ibáñez de Ibero y González del Río. As his parents' surnames were so similar he was often referred as Ibáñez or Ibáñez de Ibero or as Marquis of Mulhacén. When he died in Nice (France), he was still enrolled in the Engineer Corps of the Spanish Army. As he died around midnight, the date of his death is ambiguous, Spaniards retained 28th, and other Europeans 29 January.

== Scientific career ==
=== From the Map Commission to the Geographic and Statistical Institute in Spain ===
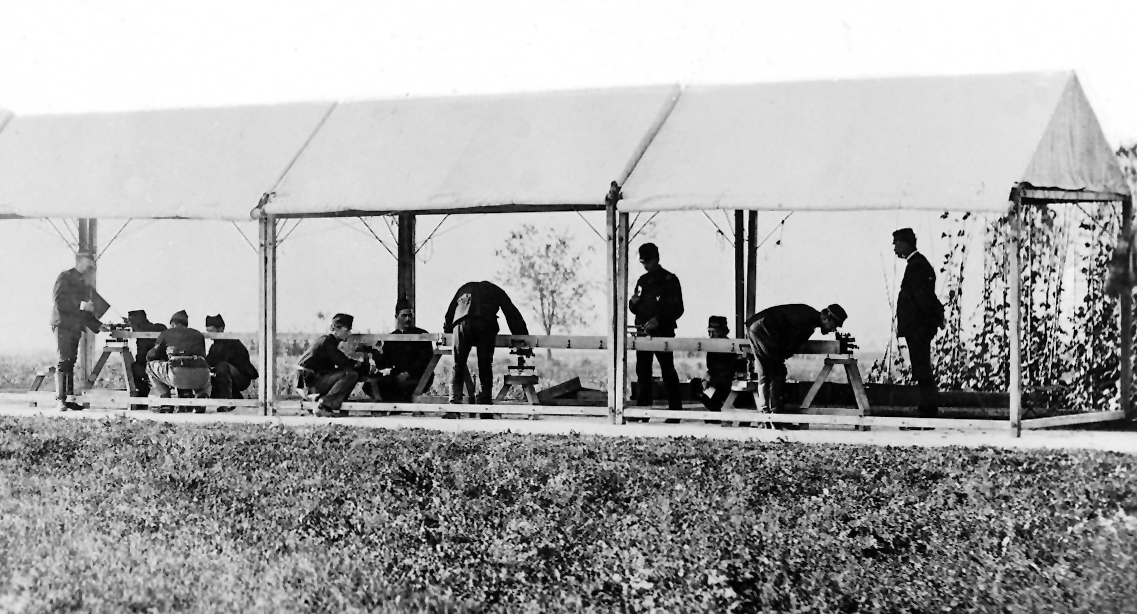
Swiss baseline measurement with Ibáñez apparatus in 1880.

Spain adopted the metric system in 1849. The Government was urged by the Spanish Royal Academy of Sciences to approve the creation of a large-scale map of Spain in 1852. The following year Ibáñez was appointed to undertake this task. As all the scientific and technical equipment for a vast undertaking of this kind had to be created, Ibáñez, in collaboration with his comrade, Captain Frutos Saavedra Meneses, drew up the project of a new apparatus for measuring bases. He recognized that the end standards with which the most perfect devices of the eighteenth century and those of the first half of the nineteenth century were still equipped, that Jean-Charles de Borda or Friedrich Wilhelm Bessel simply joined measuring the intervals by means of vernier calipers or glass wedges, would be replaced advantageously for accuracy by the system, designed by Ferdinand Rudolph Hassler for the United States Coast Survey, and which consisted of using a single standard with lines marked on the bar and microscopic measurements. Regarding the two methods by which the effect of temperature was taken into account, Ibáñez used both the bimetallic rulers, in platinum and brass, which he first employed for the central base of Spain, and the simple iron ruler with inlaid mercury thermometers which was used in Switzerland.

Ibáñez and Saavedra went to Paris to supervise the production by Jean Brunner of a measuring instrument they had devised and which was calibrated against the legal metre (443.296 lines of the toise). It was compared with Borda's double-toise N°1 which was the main reference for measuring all geodetic bases in France and whose length was by definition 3.8980732 metres at a specified temperature. The four-metre-long Spanish measuring instrument, which became known as the Spanish Standard (French: Règle espagnole), was replicated in order to be used in Egypt. In 1863, Ibáñez and Ismail Effendi Mustafa compared the Spanish Standard with the Egyptian Standard in Madrid. These comparisons were essential for metrological traceability. Moreover, because of thermal expansion, geodesists tried to assess temperature effect on standards in the field in order to avoid observational errors.

In 1858 Spain's central geodetic base of triangulation was measured in Madridejos (Toledo) with exceptional precision for the time thanks to the Spanish Standard. Ibáñez and his colleagues wrote a monograph which was translated into French by Aimé Laussedat. The experiment, in which the results of two methods were compared, was a landmark in the controversy between French and German geodesists about the length of geodesic triangulation bases, and empirically validated the method of General Johann Jacob Bayer, founder of the Central European Arc Measurement.

From 1865 to 1868 Ibáñez added the survey of the Balearic Islands with that of the Iberian Peninsula. For this work, he devised a new instrument, which allowed much faster measurements. In 1869, Ibáñez brought it along to Southampton where Alexander Ross Clarke was making the necessary measurements to compare the Standards of length used in the World. Finally, this second version of the appliance, called the Ibáñez apparatus, was used in Switzerland to measure the geodetic bases of Aarberg, Weinfelden and Bellinzona. In June 1886, following these operations, Ibáñez's apparatus was recalibrated on Brunner's international bimetallic apparatus (itself calibrated on the international prototype metre) at the International Bureau of Weights and Measures (BIPM).

A difference of 1/(65 000) between the French and Spanish triangulations appeared when the French triangulation, which until then, like the Spanish triangulation, was based on measurements taken with instruments calibrated on Borda's double-toise no. 1, was reduced to the international prototype metre, itself calibrated on the Mètre des Archives. Assuming a linear thermal expansion coefficient of 11.6·10^{−6} °C^{-1} for steel, the difference between the legal metre (defined as 443.296 lines of the Toise of Peru) and the international metre (defined as the length of the Mètre des Archives) must be related to a temperature error of approximately 1.3 °C during the manufacturing of Borda apparatus, which was used for baseline measurements of the Arc measurement of Delambre and Méchain.

In 1870 Ibáñez founded the Spanish National Geographic Institute which he then directed until 1889. At the time it was the world's biggest geographic institute. It encompassed geodesy, general topography, leveling, cartography, statistics and the general service of weights and measures.

=== Measurement of the Paris meridian over the Mediterranean Sea ===
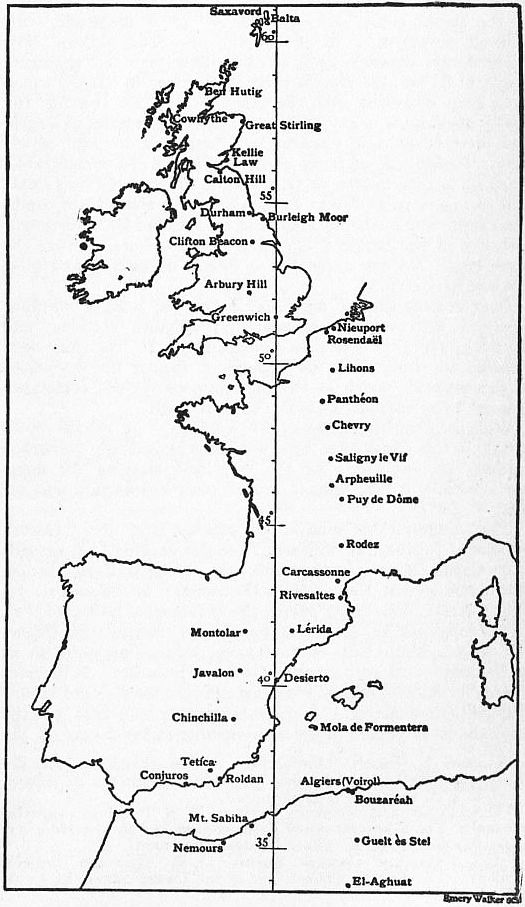
The West Europe-Africa Meridian-arc shown extending from the Shetland Islands at the top of the map, through Great Britain, France and Spain to El Aghuat in Algeria, whose parameters were calculated from surveys carried out in the mid to late 19th century. The Greenwich meridian is depicted rather than the Paris meridian.

Jean Brunner displayed the Ibáñez-Brunner apparatus at the Exposition Universelle of 1855. Copies of the Spanish standard were also made for France and Germany. These standards would be used for the most important operations of European geodesy. Indeed, the southward extension of Paris meridian's triangulation by Pierre Méchain (1803–1804), then François Arago and Jean-Baptiste Biot (1806–1809) had not been secured by any baseline measurement in Spain.

Moreover Louis Puissant declared in 1836 to the French Academy of Sciences that Jean Baptiste Joseph Delambre and Pierre Méchain had made errors in the triangulation of the meridian arc, which had been used for determining the length of the metre. This is why Antoine Yvon Villarceau verified the geodetic operations at eight points of the Paris meridian arc from 1861 to 1866. Some of the errors in the operations of Delambre and Méchain were then corrected.

In 1865 the triangulation of Spain was connected with that of Portugal and France. In 1866 at the conference of the Association of Geodesy in Neuchâtel, Ibáñez announced that Spain would collaborate in remeasuring and extending the French meridian arc. From 1870 to 1894, François Perrier, then Jean-Antonin-Léon Bassot proceeded to a new survey. In 1879 Ibáñez and François Perrier completed the junction between the geodetic networks of Spain and Algeria and thus completed the measurement of a meridian arc which extended from Shetland to the Sahara. This connection was a remarkable enterprise where triangles with a maximum length of 270 km were observed from mountain stations (Mulhacén, Tetica, Filahoussen, M'Sabiha) over the Mediterranean Sea.

This meridian arc was named West Europe-Africa Meridian-arc by Alexander Ross Clarke and Friedrich Robert Helmert. It yielded a value for the equatorial radius of the earth a = 6 377 935 metres, the ellipticity being assumed as 1/299.15 according to Bessel ellipsoid. The radius of curvature of this arc is not uniform, being, in the mean, about 600 metres greater in the northern than in the southern part.

According to the calculations made at the central bureau of the International Geodetic Association, the net does not follow the meridian exactly, but deviates both to the west and to the east; actually, the meridian of Greenwich is nearer the mean than that of Paris.

=== International scientific collaboration in geodesy and calls for an international standard unit of length ===
In 1866 Spain, represented by Ibáñez, joined the Central European Arc Measurement (German: Mitteleuropäische Gradmessung) at the Permanent Commission meeting in Neuchâtel. In 1867 at the second General Conference of the Central European Arc Measurement held in Berlin, the question of an international standard unit of length was discussed to combine the measurements made in different countries to determine the size and shape of the Earth. The Conference recommended the adoption of the metre and the creation of an international metre commission, according to a preliminary discussion between Johann Jacob Baeyer, Adolphe Hirsch and Carlos Ibáñez e Ibáñez de Ibero. Ferdinand Rudolph Hassler's use of the metre in coastal survey, which had been an argument for the introduction of the Metric Act of 1866 allowing the use of the metre in the United States, probably also played a role in the choice of the metre as international scientific unit of length and the proposal by the European Arc Measurement (German: Europäische Gradmessung) to "establish a European international bureau for weights and measures".

The French Academy of Sciences and the Bureau des Longitudes in Paris drew the attention of the French government to this issue. The Academy of St Petersburg and the English Standards Commission were in agreement with the recommendation. In November 1869 the French government issued invitations to join the International Metre Commission. Spain accepted and Ibáñez took part in the Committee of preparatory research from the first meeting of this commission in 1870. He was elected president of the Permanent Committee of the International Metre Commission in 1872. He represented Spain at the 1875 conference of the Metre Convention and at the first General Conference on Weights and Measures in 1889. At the first meeting of the International Committee for Weights and Measures, he was elected chairman of the committee, a position he held from 1875 to 1891. He received the Légion d'Honneur in recognition of his efforts to disseminate the metric system among all nations and was awarded the Poncelet Prize for his scientific contribution to metrology.

As Carlos Ibáñez e Ibáñez de Ibero stated, the International prototype metre would form the basis of the new international system of units, but it would no longer have any relation to the dimensions of the Earth that geodesists were trying to determine. It would be no more than the material representation of the unity of the system.

The European Arc Measurement decided the creation of an international geodetic standard at the General Conference held in Paris in 1875. Thus, the Commission resolved to acquire, at common expense, a measuring instrument which was to be used either to measure new bases in countries which did not have their own device or to repeat previous measurements. The comparisons of the new results with those provided by the old national standards would make it possible to obtain their equation. The apparatus would to be calibrated at the International Bureau of Weights and Measures (BIPM), using the prototype metre. The system with a microscope and bimetallic rulers, which had given such brilliant results in Spain, was proposed.

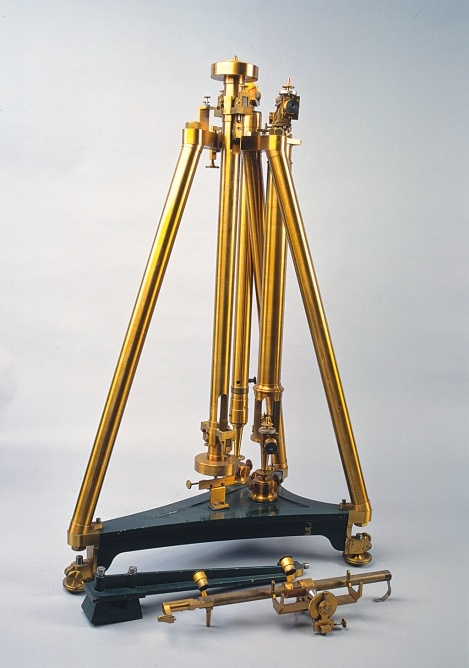
Gravimeter with variant of Repsold-Bessel pendulum.

The 1875 Conference of the International Association of Geodesy also dealt with the best instrument to be used for the determination of gravitational acceleration. After an in-depth discussion in which an American scholar, Charles Sanders Peirce, took part, the association decided in favor of the reversion pendulum, which was used in Switzerland, and it was resolved to redo in Berlin, in the station where Friedrich Wilhelm Bessel made his famous measurements, the determination of gravity by means of devices of various kinds employed in different countries, to compare them and thus to have the equation of their scales.

The progresses of metrology combined with those of gravimetry through improvement of Kater's pendulum led to a new era of geodesy. If precision metrology had needed the help of geodesy, it could not continue to prosper without the help of metrology. It was then necessary to define a single unit to express all the measurements of terrestrial arcs, and all determinations of the gravitational acceleration by the means of pendulum. Metrology had to create a common unit, adopted and respected by all civilized nations. It was thus crucial to compare at controlled temperatures with great precision and to the same unit all the standards for measuring geodesic bases, and all the pendulum rods. Only when this series of metrological comparisons would be finished with a probable error of a thousandth of a millimetre would geodesy be able to link the works of the different nations with one another, and then proclaim the result of the measurement of the Globe. In 1901, Friedrich Robert Helmert found, mainly by gravimetry, parameters of the ellipsoid remarkably close to reality. Although marked by the concern to correct vertical deflections, taking into account the contributions of gravimetry, research between 1910 and 1950 remained practically limited to large continental triangulations. The most significant work would be that by John Fillmore Hayford, which relied mainly on the North American national network. His ellipsoid was adopted in 1924 by the International Union of Geodesy and Geophysics.

The reversible pendulum built by the Repsold brothers was used in Switzerland in 1865 by Émile Plantamour for the measurement of gravitational acceleration in six stations of the Swiss geodetic network. Following the example set by this country and under the patronage of the International Geodetic Association, Austria, Bavaria, Prussia, Russia and Saxony undertook gravity determinations on their respective territories. As the figure of the Earth could be inferred from variations of gravitational field, the United States Coast Survey's direction instructed Charles Sanders Peirce in the spring of 1875 to proceed to Europe for the purpose of making pendulum experiments to chief initial stations for operations of this sort, to bring the determinations of gravitational acceleration in America into communication with those of other parts of the world; and also for the purpose of making a careful study of the methods of pursuing these researches in the different countries of Europe.

President of the Permanent Commission of the European Arc Measurement from 1874 to 1886, Ibáñez became the first president of the International Geodetic Association (1887–1891) after the death of Johann Jacob Baeyer. Under Ibáñez's presidency, the International Geodetic Association acquired a global dimension with the accession of the United States, Mexico, Chile, Argentina and Japan.

In 1889 the General Conference on Weights and Measures met at Sèvres, the seat of the International Bureau. It performed the first great deed dictated by the motto inscribed in the pediment of the splendid edifice that is the metric system: "A tous les temps, à tous les peuples" (For all times, to all peoples); and this deed consisted in the approval and distribution, among the governments of the states supporting the Metre Convention, of prototype standards of hitherto unknown precision intended to propagate the metric unit throughout the whole world. These prototypes were made of a platinum-iridium alloy which combined all the qualities of hardness, permanence, and resistance to chemical agents which rendered it suitable for making into standards required to last for centuries. Yet their high price excluded them from the ordinary field of science. For metrology the matter of expansibility was fundamental; as a matter of fact the temperature measuring error related to the length measurement in proportion to the expansibility of the standard and the constantly renewed efforts of metrologists to protect their measuring instruments against the interfering influence of temperature revealed clearly the importance they attached to the expansion-induced errors. It was common knowledge, for instance, that effective measurements were possible only inside a building, the rooms of which were well protected against the changes in outside temperature, and the very presence of the observer created an interference against which it was often necessary to take strict precautions. Thus, the Contracting States also received a collection of thermometers which accuracy made it possible to ensure that of length measurements.

=== International Statistical Institute ===
The International Statistical Institute (ISI) was founded in 1885 during the Jubilee of the Royal Statistical Society, coinciding with the 25th anniversary of the Société de statistique de Paris. Its origins can be traced back to a series of international statistical congresses, the first of which was chaired by Adolphe Quetelet and held in Brussels in 1853, following the Great Exhibition of 1851 organized in London at the initiative of Prince Albert of Saxe-Coburg-Gotha, husband of Queen Victoria. As a leading scientist of his time, Ibáñez was one of the 81 initial members of the International Statistical Institute and delegate of Spain to the first ISI session (now called World Statistic Congress) in Rome in 1887. The 81 founding members of the ISI constituted the elite of statisticians of that era within government administrations and scientific academies. He was indeed vice president of the Spanish Royal Academy of Sciences, honorary academician of the Prussian Academy of Sciences and of the Berlin Geographical Society, of the National Academy of Sciences of Argentina, associated academician of the Royal Academy of Sciences, Letters and Fine Arts of Belgium, and correspondent of the French Academy of Sciences.

It was known that the Mètre des Archives was about one-fifth of a millimeter too short compared to its 1791 definition—that is, compared to the "true distance" between the pole and the equator—but this fact did not trigger the movement that would lead to a new definition of the metre. Rather, the metrological quality of the geodetic standards calibrated on the Toise of Peru was gradually proving insufficient to meet the growing need for accuracy in geodetic measurements. Since the metre was originally defined, each time a new measurement is made, with more accurate instruments, methods or techniques, it is said that the metre is based on some error, from calculations or measurements. When Ibáñez took part to the measurement of the West Europe-Africa Meridian-arc, mathematicians like Legendre and Gauss had developed new methods for processing data, including the "least squares method" which allowed to compare experimental data tainted with observational errors to a mathematical model.

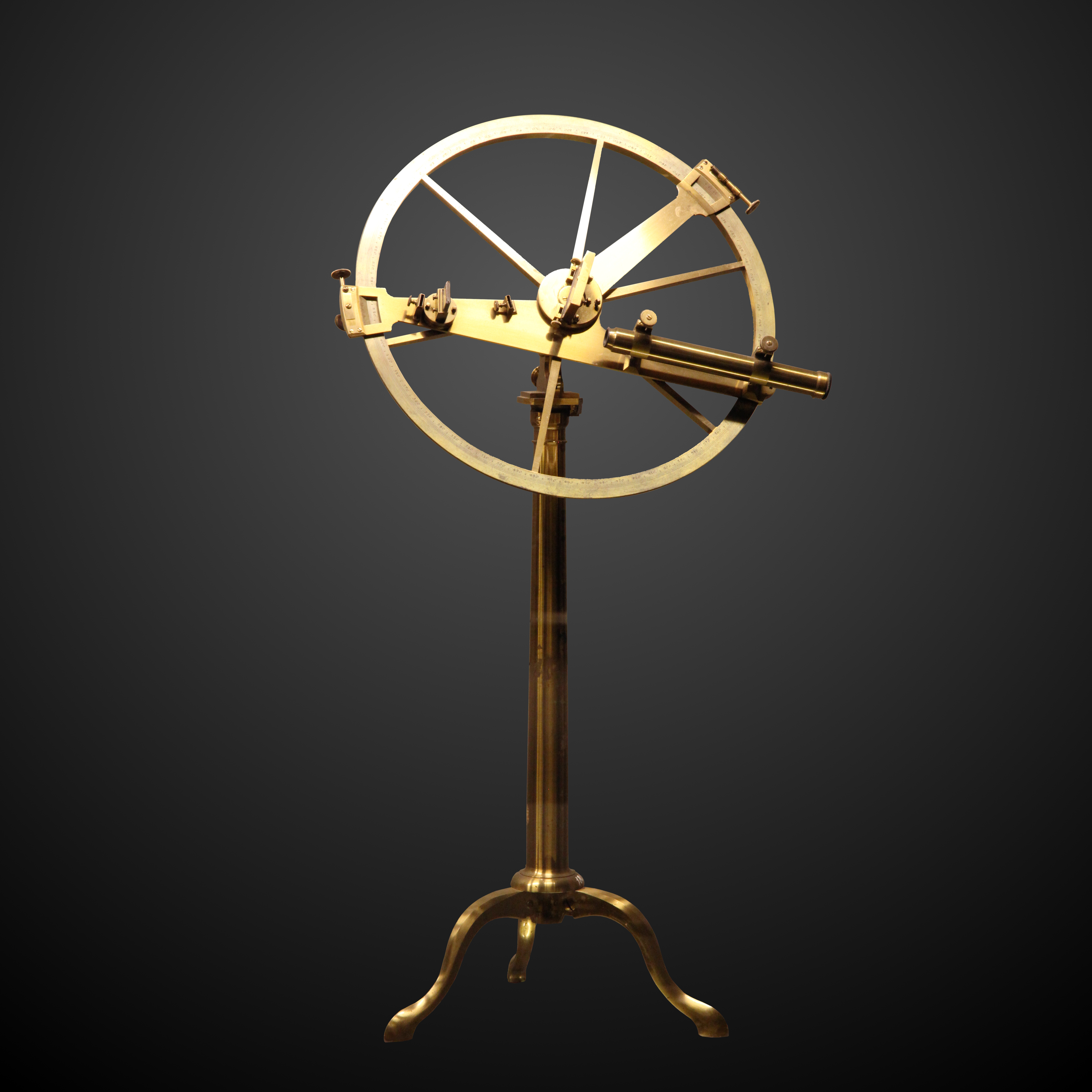
Repeating circle used for the survey of the meridian arc from Dunkirk to Barcelona by Delambre and Méchain

Thanks to the determination and skill of Delambre and Méchain, the Enlightenment of science overcame the Tower of Babel of weights and measures. But it was not without difficulty: Méchain made a mistake which would almost cause him to lose his mind. In his book, The Measure of All Things: the seven year odyssey and hidden error that transformed the world, Ken Alder recalls some errors that crept into the measurement of the two French scientists and that Méchain had even noticed an inaccuracy which he had not dared to admit. By measuring the latitude of two stations in Barcelona, Méchain had found that the difference between these latitudes was greater than predicted by direct measurement of distance by triangulation. Indeed, clearance in the central axis of the repeating circle caused wear and consequently the zenith measurements contained significant systematic errors.

Nevertheless, it was an unfavourable vertical deflection which gave an inaccurate determination of Barcelona's latitude and a metre "too short" compared to a more general definition taken from the average of a large number of arcs. The geoid is not a surface of revolution and none of its meridians is identical to another, in other words, the theoretical definition of the metre was inaccessible and misleading at the time of Delambre and Mechain arc measurement, as the geoid is a ball, which on the whole can be assimilated to an ellipsoid of revolution, but which in detail differs from it so as to prohibit any generalization and any extrapolation from the measurement of a single meridian arc. Furthermore, until the Hayford ellipsoid was calculated, vertical deflections were considered as random errors.

Moreover, it was necessary to assume an oblateness of the Earth in order to calculate the length of the metre from the meridian arc measured by Delambre and Méchain. Around 1804, Legendre, using the least squares method, calculated a flattening of 1/150 from the latitude of five astronomical stations (Dunkirk, Paris, Évaux-les-Bains, Carcassonne and Barcelona), which was hardly consistent with what was known at the time.

Charles Sanders Peirce and Isaac-Charles Élisée Cellérier (1818–1889), a Genevan mathematician independently discovered a mathematical formula to correct systematic errors of the gravimeter with variant of Repsold-Bessel pendulum which had been noticed by Émile Plantamour and Adolphe Hirsch. In 1901, Friedrich Robert Helmert determined the values of his ellipsoid of reference taking into account gravimetry work of the International Geodetic Association. He found 1/298,3 for the flattening of the Earth. This was remarkably close to reality compared to the value of 1/334 which had been used to compute the length of the metre a century earlier. This was also the result of the Metre Convention of 1875, when the metre was adopted as an international scientific unit of length for the convenience of continental European geodesists.

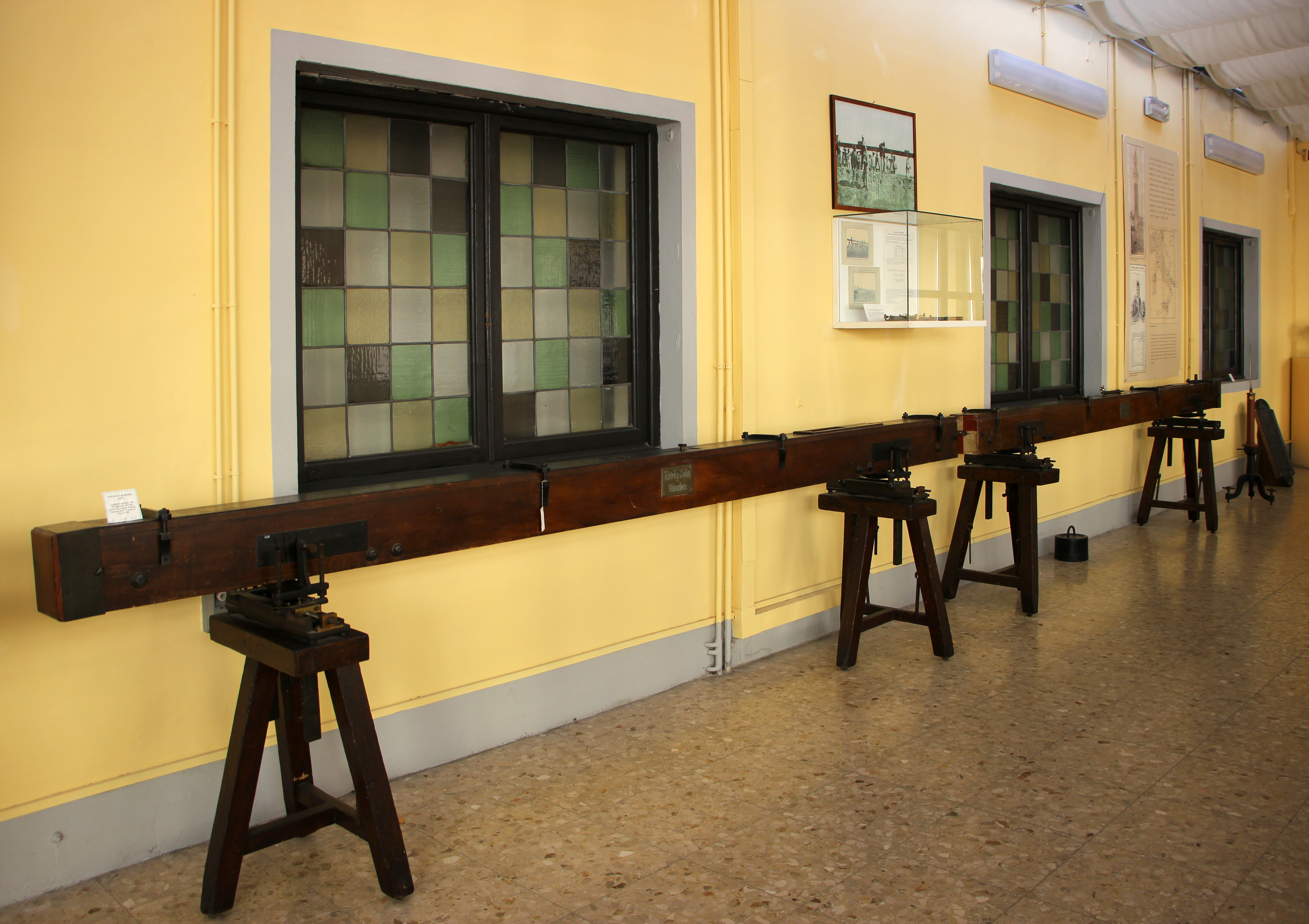
Bessel's apparatus at the Museum of Instruments of the Military Geographic Institute of Florence.

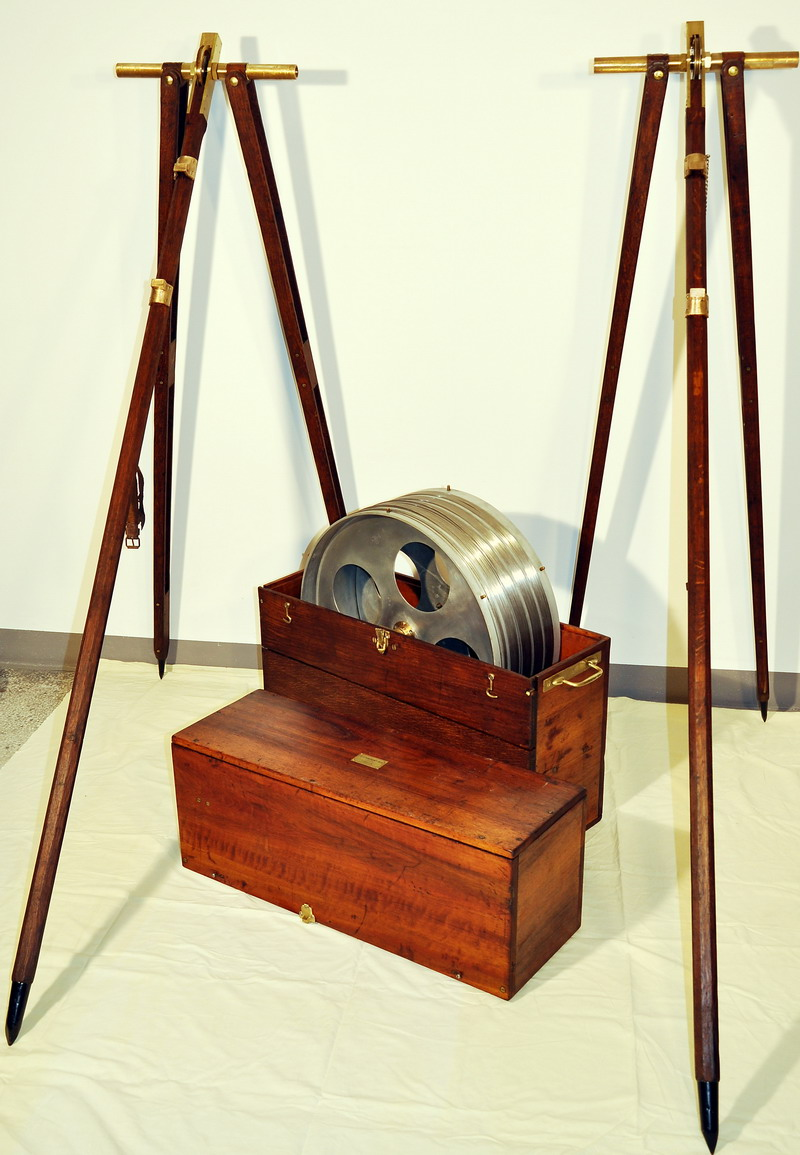
Invar wire baseline apparatus

In order to avoid the difficulty in exactly determining the temperature of a bar by the mercury thermometer, Friedrich Wilhelm Bessel, inspired by Jean-Charles de Borda, introduced in 1834 near Königsberg a compound bar which constituted a metallic thermometer. A zinc bar was laid on an iron bar two toises long, both bars being perfectly planed and in free contact, the zinc bar being slightly shorter and the two bars rigidly united at one end. As the temperature varied, the difference of the lengths of the bars, as perceived by the other end, also varied, and afforded a quantitative correction for temperature variations, which was applied to reduce the length to standard temperature. During the measurement of the base line the bars were not allowed to come into contact, the interval being measured by the insertion of glass wedges. The results of the comparisons of four measuring rods with one another and with the standards were elaborately computed by the method of least-squares. Indeed, before invar's discovery, geodesists tried to assess temperature effect on measuring devices in order to avoid observational errors.

In the 19th century, statisticians knew that scientific observations were subject to two types of error: constant errors and random errors. The effects of the latter could be corrected using the least squares method. Constant errors, on the other hand, had to be carefully avoided, as they were caused by various factors that consistently altered the results of observations in the same direction. These errors thus tended to render the results they affected worthless. Consider, for example, measuring a straight line to determine its length in metres. If a metal ruler is used for this measurement, and an error is made in determining the temperature at which its length corresponds to that of a metre, all observations will be affected by a consistent error stemming from this error, and no matter how many times the operation is repeated, it will be impossible to obtain an accurate result. If, on the contrary, we know exactly the temperature at which the ruler is equivalent to the metre and if the error affects the actual temperature of the ruler in the different observations, each observation will be affected by a random error, but these errors will occur sometimes in one direction and sometimes in the other, and by repeating the operation a large number of times we can hope to eliminate their effect by compensating for them.

In the absence of a standard temperature scale, inconsistencies arose when attempting to link geodetic surveys from different countries to create a European geodetic network. In 1886, Adolphe Hisch, secretary of the International Committee for Weights and Measures (CIPM) and of the International Geodetic Association, proposed that all the toises that had served as geodetic standards in Europe during the 19th century be compared at the BIPM with the Toise of Peru and with the new international metre so that the measurements made until then could be used to measure the Earth. The result of these comparisons made it possible to reduce the arcs measured in Germany to the metre. The discordance of 1/(66 000) which remained between the triangles common to the German and French networks could be reduced to 1/(600 000) which was at the limit of accuracy of geodetic surveys at the time. In fact, the length of Bessel's Toise, which according to the then legal ratio between the metre and the Toise of Peru, should be equal to 1.9490348 m, would be found to be 26.2·10^{−6} m greater during measurements carried out by Jean-René Benoît at the BIPM. It was the consideration of the divergences between the different toises used by geodesists that led the European Arc Measurement (German: Europäische Gradmessung ) to consider, at the meeting of its Permanent Commission in Neuchâtel in 1866, the founding of a World Institute for the Comparison of Geodetic Standards, the first step towards the creation of the BIPM. Careful comparisons with several standard toises showed that the international metre calibrated on the Mètre des Archives was not exactly equal to the legal metre or 443.296 lines of the toise, but, in round numbers, 1/(75 000) of the length smaller, or approximately 0.013 millimetres. By contrast, in 2007, a comparison of the American Committee meter and its Swiss counterpart was carried out at NIST and METAS. The two metre standards can be considered perfectly equivalent, with a difference of only (0.96 ±3.0) micrometers. The poor quality of the measuring surfaces explained the significant uncertainty in the measurements compared to today's standards.

The distinction between systematic and random errors is far from being as sharp as one might think at first glance. In reality, there are no or very few random errors. As science progresses, the causes of certain errors are sought out, studied, their laws discovered. These errors pass from the class of random errors into that of systematic errors. The ability of the observer consists in discovering the greatest possible number of systematic errors to be able, once he has become acquainted with their laws, to free his results from them using a method or appropriate corrections.

The BIPM's thermometry work led to the discovery of special alloys of iron-nickel, in particular invar, for which its director, the Swiss physicist Charles Édouard Guillaume, was granted the Nobel Prize for physics in 1920. In 1900, the International Committee for Weights and Measures responded to a request from the International Association of geodesy and included in the work program of the International Bureau of Weights and Measures the study of measurements by invar's wires. Edvard Jäderin, a Swedish geodesist, had invented a method of measuring geodetic bases, based on the use of taut wires under a constant effort. However, before the discovery of invar, this process was much less precise than the classic method. Charles-Édouard Guillaume demonstrated the effectiveness of Jäderin's method, improved by the use of invar's threads. He measured a base in the Simplon Tunnel in 1905. The accuracy of the measurements was equal to that of the old methods, while the speed and ease of the measurements were incomparably higher. This method was subsequently used in the construction of large particle accelerators.

== Late career, marriages and descent ==
In 1889, Ibáñez had a stroke and resigned from the management of the Institute of Geography and Statistics, which he had directed for 19 years. His decision seemed to have been precipitated by the publication of a decree which took away economic control of the Institute and handed it over to the Minister of Public Works. Indeed, this resignation took effect during a smear campaign orchestrated by Carlist journalist Antonio de Valbuena. The reappearance of the general's first wife after his death in 1891 further discredited him and led to the annulment of his second marriage.

Carlos Ibáñez e Ibáñez de Ibero was married in 1861 to a Frenchwoman, Jeanne Baboulène Thénié. A daughter was born from this marriage. He remarried in 1878 to a Swiss woman, Cécilia Grandchamp. Carlos Ibáñez de Ibero Grandchamp was born from this second union. After the death of Carlos Ibáñez e Ibáñez de Ibero, his two children and Cécilia Grandchamp settled in Geneva, where the latter was from.

Carlos Ibáñez de Ibero Grandchamp, engineer and doctor of philosophy and letters from the University of Paris founded in 1913 the Institute of Hispanic Studies (current Training and Research Unit of Iberian and Latin American Studies of the Faculty of Letters of Sorbonne University). Although it has been argued that the title of Marquis of Mulhacén was granted to him as a reward for the founding of the Institute of Hispanic Studies of the University of Paris, the invalidation of his parents' marriage prevented him from officially obtaining this title.

Carlos Ibáñez e Ibáñez de Ibero's eldest daughter, Elena Ibáñez de Ibero, married Jacques Louis Willemin a Swiss lawyer and politician and former mayor of Plainpalais. The title of Marquis of Mulhacén passed to their son, then to their grandson, and finally to the latter's eldest child. In 1936, Albert Dupont-Willemin, the son-in-law of Jacques Louis Willemin created in Geneva with Jeanne Hersch and André Oltramare the Association of Friends of Republican Spain, a pacifist and anti-fascist mutual aid association. Elena Dupont-Willemin, his wife and the Marquis' granddaughter, accompanied Sofía Blasco on her fundraising tour for the Second Spanish Republic. Elena Dupont-Willemin was an active member of the Geneva and Swiss feminist movement and campaigned for women's suffrage.

The son of Elena and Albert Dupont-Willemin, Albert-Louis Henri Dupont-Willemin, was president of the Dramatic Art Foundation, an organization that has provided overall management of the Théâtre LE POCHE and the Comédie de Genève since the early 1980s. A former President of the Geneva Bar Association, he also worked to promote the rights of the defense and was elected in 1995 to the presidency of the Union Internationale des Avocats at the time of the creation of the International Criminal Court. Eurydice Vernay is the granddaughter of Albert and Elena Dupont-Willemin.

== Legacy ==
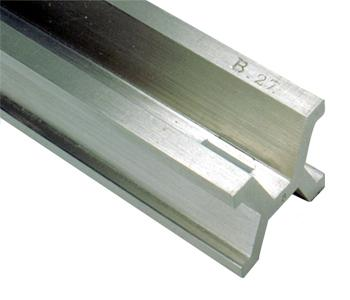
Closeup of National Prototype Meter Bar No. 27, made in 1889 by the International Bureau of Weights and Measures (BIPM) and given to the United States, which served as the standard for American cartography from 1890 replacing the Committee Meter, an authentic copy of the Mètre des Archives produced in 1799 in Paris, which Ferdinand Rudolph Hassler had brought to the United States in 1805.

In 1889, the French Minister of Foreign Affairs, Eugène Spuller introduced the first General Conference on Weights and Measures with these words:

Your task, so useful, so beneficial to mankind, has been traversed by many vicissitudes for a hundred years. Like all the great things in this world, it has cost many pains, efforts, sacrifices, not to mention the difficulties, dangers, fatigue, tribulations of all kinds, which endured the two great French astronomers Delambre and Méchain, whose works are the basis of all yours. I am sure to be your interpreter, paying them supreme tribute on this day. Who does not remember with emotion the dangers to which Méchain so generously exposed his life? General Morin, who has been your worthy colleague for so long, wrote a few lines on this subject that you will be proud to hear: "To brave dangers similar to those which Méchain ran with the necessary calm, it is not enough to be devoted to science and to its duties; you must have an empire over your senses which will protect you from this kind of vertigo, in the shelter of which the most intrepid soldiers are not always. Someone who, without flinching, has faced the bullets a hundred times is, on the contrary, surprised by this insurmountable weakness in the presence of the emptiness that space offers him." It is a soldier speaking, Gentlemen; please listen to him again when he adds: "Science therefore also has its heroes who, happier than those of war, leave behind only works useful to humanity and not ruins and vengeful hatred."

Spuller, Eugène (1889), Compte rendus de la première Conférence générale des poids et mesures (PDF), p. 8

One of Ibáñez most notable achievements was the geodetic junction of Spain and Algeria. The Spanish government chose the name of the peak of Mulhacén to recognize Ibáñez scientific achievement, by conferring on him the title of 1st Marquis of Mulhacén, granted, as it is said in the royal decree, " in recognition of the brilliant services which he rendered during his long career, directing with rare talent the Geographical and Statistical Institute of Spain, and contributing to the prestige of Spain among the other nations of Europe and America ".

Unfortunately, the extension of the Paris meridian arc over the Mediterranean Sea in 1879 would soon be forgotten due to the adoption of the Greenwich meridian as the prime meridian of the world at the 1883 International Geodetic Conference in Rome, which was confirmed the next year at the International Meridian Conference in Washington, and because of Spain's adoption of Greenwich Mean Time by a decree of 27 July 1900, applicable from 1 January 1901. Moreover, it was the Struve Geodetic Arc which would become part of the longest meridian arc of the Old World. In 1954, the connection of the southerly extension of the Struve Arc with an arc running north from South Africa through Egypt would bring the course of a major meridian arc back to land where Eratosthenes had founded geodesy.

From 1910, the astronomical clocks of the Paris Observatory sent the time to sea daily through the Eiffel Tower within a radius of 5 000 km. The development of wireless telegraphy allowed unifying Universal Time. On 9 March 1911, France adopted Greenwich Mean Time by law. However, the law did not refer to Greenwich Prime Meridian, but to the local mean time of Paris delayed by 9 minutes and 21 seconds. In 1912, following a report by Gustave Ferrié, the Bureau des Longitudes organized at the Paris Observatory a Conférence internationale de l'heure radiotélégraphique (International Radiotelegraph Time Conference). The International Time Bureau was created and installed in the premises of the Paris Observatory. However, due to World War I, the International Convention was never ratified. In 1919, the existence of the International Time Bureau was formalized under the authority of an International Time Commission, under the aegis of the International Astronomical Union, created by Benjamin Baillaud. The International Time Bureau was dissolved in 1987 and its tasks were divided between the International Bureau of Weights and Measures and the International Earth Rotation and Reference Systems Service (IERS).

In 1936, irregularities in the speed of Earth's rotation due to the unpredictable movement of air and water masses were discovered through the use of quartz clocks. They implied that the Earth's rotation was an imprecise way of determining time. As a result, the definition of the second, first seen as a fraction of the Earth's rotation, evolved and became a fraction of the Earth's orbit. Finally, in 1967, the second was defined by atomic clocks. The resulting time scale is the International Atomic Time (TAI). Currently, it is established from more than 450 atomic clocks world-wide by the International Bureau of Weights and Measures. So far, the International Earth Rotation and Reference Systems Service also plays a role in Coordinated Universal Time (UTC) by deciding whether to insert a leap second so that it is kept in line with the rotation of the Earth.

The International System of Units (SI, abbreviated from the French Système international (d'unités)), the modern form of the metric system was revised in 2019. It is the only system of measurement with an official status in nearly every country in the world. It comprises a coherent system of units of measurement starting with seven base units, which are the second (the unit of time with the symbol s), metre (length, m), kilogram (mass, kg), ampere (electric current, A), kelvin (thermodynamic temperature, K), mole (amount of substance, mol), and candela (luminous intensity, cd). Since 2019, the magnitudes of all SI units have been defined by declaring exact numerical values for seven defining constants when expressed in terms of their SI units. These defining constants are the hyperfine transition frequency of caesium Δν_{Cs}, the speed of light in vacuum c, the Planck constant h, the elementary charge e, the Boltzmann constant k, the Avogadro constant N_{A}, and the luminous efficacy K_{cd}.

== See also ==
- Arc measurement of Delambre and Méchain
- International Bureau of Weights and Measures
- History of the metre
- History of geodesy
