= Eurydice Vernay =

Swiss violinist

- Born: December 31, 1989 (age 36); Geneva, Switzerland
- Instrument: Violin
- Member of: Orchestre national d’Île-de-France
- Formerly of: Biel Solothurn Symphony Orchestra; Orchestre de la Suisse Romande; Lucerne Symphony Orchestra

Eurydice Vernay (born 31 December 1989) is a Swiss violinist.

== History ==
Eurydice Vernay was born in Geneva. She began playing the violin at the age of 5. She studied with Tibor Varga and Lihay Bendayan in Sion, with Zakhar Bron in Madrid, with Boris Kuschnir in Vienna and subsequently with Aaron Rosand in New York. She is a graduate of the Geneva Academy of Music (Master's degree in Orchestral Performance with Mihaela Martin) and the University of Music Basel (Master's degree in Solo Performance with Rainer Schmidt), a prize winner of several national and international violin and chamber music competitions, and has participated in masterclasses in Europe, Israel and the United States with musicians such as Shmuel Ashkenasi, Ana Chumachenco, Igor Oistrakh, Ivry Gitlis, Hatto Beyerle and Eric Höbarth.

Currently a member of the Orchestre philharmonique de Strasbourg, she held a permanent position with the Biel Solothurn Symphony Orchestra, the Orchestre de la Suisse Romande, the Orchestre national d’Île-de-France and the Lucerne Symphony Orchestra, as well as a temporary position with the Tonhalle Orchestra Zurich, which recorded, under the direction of Paavo Järvi, symphonies No. 1 to 5 and A Midsummer Night's Dream by Felix Mendelssohn. In 2024 at the Opéra de Monte-Carlo, she accompanied Rolando Villazón with the Swiss Orchestra under the direction of Lena-Lisa Wüstendörfer.

At the same time, she studied Baroque violin and viola for three years with Amandine Beyer at the Schola Cantorum Basiliensis. She regularly performs in ensembles for historical instruments, such as le Concert Spirituel, Pygmalion and “Cappella Gabetta”. In addition, she is currently taking a course in modern viola in the class of Silvia Simionescu at the Basel Academy of Music.

Eurydice Vernay is the granddaughter of Albert and Elena Dupont-Willemin. Elena Dupont-Willemin was the daughter of Jacques-Louis Willemin, a former mayor of Plainpalais, and Elena Ibáñez de Ibero. The latter was the daughter of Carlos Ibáñez e Ibáñez de Ibero, 1st Marquis of Mulhacén.
