= Frutos Saavedra Meneses =

Spanish soldier, geodesist and politician

Frutos de Saavedra
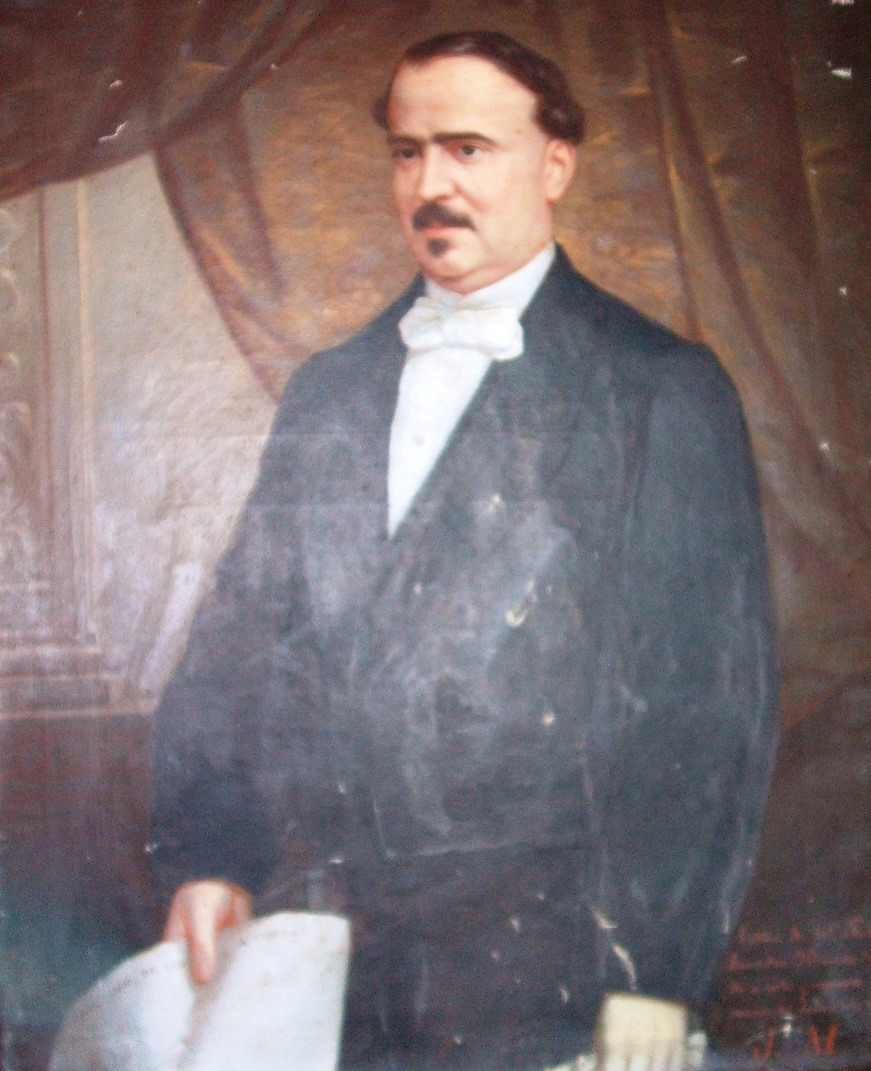
- Born: Frutos Saavedra Meneses; 25 October 1823; Ferrol (La Coruña), Spain
- Died: 27 October 1868 (aged 45); Madrid, Spain

Frutos de Saavedra y Meneses (25 October 1823 – 27 October 1868) was a Spanish soldier, geodesist and politician.

== Biography ==
He was born into a family of the Galician nobility. He was the son of Antonio de Saavedra y Serantes, a landowner from Puentedeume and a knight of the Real Maestranza de Caballería de Sevilla, and María de la Candelaria Meneses. His uncle was Field Marshal José de Saavedra y Serantes.

He completed his training at the Military Academy in Segovia, where he became an instructor. He reached the rank of colonel.

Incorporated into the artillery corps, he represented this corps in the Spain Map Commission, where he made a friend of Carlos Ibáñez e Ibáñez de Ibero. They designed together a geodetic standard which was made in Paris by Jean Brunner. This instrument was used to measure the central base of the Spanish geodetic network.

He began his political career as a member of the Liberal Union for the constituency of Coruña and served four terms between 1860 and 1866. In 1864, he was appointed Director General of Public Works.

Saavedra was appointed in 1862 to the Spanish Royal Academy of Sciences because of his geodesic work. In 1867 he was also appointed academician of the Royal Spanish Academy, but died before he could be formally inducted.
