= Carlos Ibáñez (Spanish footballer) =

Spanish footballer and manager

Personal information
- Full name: Carlos Ibáñez García
- Date of birth: 9 August 1912
- Place of birth: Petrer, Alicante, Spain
- Date of death: 14 February 1942 (aged 29)
- Place of death: Sant Adrià de Besòs, Spain
- Position: Defender

Senior career*
| Years | Team | Apps | (Gls) |
| 1930–1931 | CE Europa | 7 | (0) |
| 1931–1932 | Catalunya | | |
| 1932–1933 | Júpiter | | |
| 1933–1934 | Real Oviedo | 6 | (0) |
| 1934–1935 | Espanyol | 1 | (0) |
| 1935–1936 | Júpiter | | |
| Total | | 14 | (0) |
- * Club domestic league appearances and goals

Carlos Ibáñez García (9 August 1912 – 14 February 1942) was a Spanish footballer who played as a defender for Real Oviedo and Espanyol in the 1930s.

== Playing career ==
Born on 9 August 1912 in Petrer, Alicante, (Note: Some sources wrongly claim that he was born on 9 August 1907, or 25 October 1911.) Ibáñez was 11-year-old when his family moved to Catalonia, where he began joined the ranks of CE Europa, first as a ballboy, and later as a first-team player, with whom he played for two seasons, from 1930 until 1932, the first in La Liga, and the second in the Segunda División, now under the name Catalunya FC, due to financial problems at the club.

After spending one season in Júpiter, he returned to the top-flight with Real Oviedo, where he had few opportunities due to the strong competition in the backline, so at the end of the season, he signed for Espanyol, where he earned 60 pesetas a month. However, he once again had few opportunities, playing only one official match for the club, a league fixture against Real Madrid on 30 December 1934 at the Chamartín, which ended in a resounding 7–2 loss. In total, he played 14 La Liga matches for Europa, Oviedo, and Espanyol.

In February 1935, just two months after the humiliation at the Chamartín, Ibáñez returned CE Europa and subsequently returned to Júpiter for the 1935–36 season, where his career was interrupted by the outbreak of the Spanish Civil War, in which he joined the Confederación Nacional del Trabajo (CNT) and went to fight on the Aragon Front.

== Later life and death ==
When the War ended, Ibáñez went into exile in France, but in early 1942, he decided to return to his homeland because of the clemency promised by the Franco regime for those who had not committed war crimes, but once there, he was arrested and taken to the La Magdalena Concentration Camp in Santander, where he was shot dead at Camp de la Bota in Sant Adrià de Besòs, where Júpiter had played its first matches, on 14 February 1942, at the age of 29.
