= Jean Brunner =

Jean Brunner or Johann Josef Brunner (1804 in Balsthal – 1862 in Paris), was a Swiss-born, French measuring instrument maker and mechanic.

== Biography ==
Jean Brunner was born in Balsthal, Switzerland (Canton Solothurn). He spent part of his apprenticeship with his father Johann Jakob Brunner in the locksmith's shop. In 1826 he moved to Vienna and finally to Paris in 1828, where he Frenchified his name. He worked there with Frederic Hutzinger and Jacques Louis Vincent Chevalier. He opened his first own workshop around 1830 at 34 Rue des Bernardin. In 1845 he moved to 183 Rue de Vaugirard. He died in Paris in 1862 at the age of 58.

After the death of Jean Brunner, his sons Emile (1834–1895) and Leon (1840–1894) took over the small company, which from then on was called Brunner Frères. With the death of Emile Brunner, the company went out in 1895.

== Achievements ==
Jean Brunner made a name for himself far beyond the borders of France by manufacturing high-precision instruments such as microscopes, telescopes, theodolites, compasses and astronomical instruments.

== See also ==
- Carlos Ibáñez e Ibáñez de Ibero – 1st president of the International Committee for Weights and Measures and president of the International Geodetic Association
