= General Conference on Weights and Measures =

International metrological authority

The General Conference on Weights and Measures (abbreviated CGPM from the French: Conférence générale des poids et mesures) is the supreme authority of the International Bureau of Weights and Measures (BIPM), the intergovernmental organization established in 1875 under the terms of the Metre Convention through which member states act together on matters related to measurement science and measurement standards. The CGPM is made up of delegates of the governments of the member states and observers from the Associates of the CGPM. It elects the International Committee for Weights and Measures (abbreviated CIPM from the Comité international des poids et mesures) as the supervisory board of the BIPM to direct and supervise it.

Initially the work of the BIPM concerned the kilogram and the metre, but in 1921 the scope of the Metre Convention was extended to accommodate all physical measurements and hence all aspects of the metric system. In 1960 the 11th CGPM approved the title International System of Units, usually known as "SI".

The General Conference receives the report of the CIPM on work accomplished; it discusses and examines the arrangements required to ensure the propagation and improvement of the International System of Units (SI); it endorses the results of new fundamental metrological determinations and various scientific resolutions of international scope; and it decides all major issues concerning the organization and development of the BIPM, including its financial endowment.

The CGPM meets in Paris, usually once every four years. The 25th meeting of the CGPM took place from 18 to 20 November 2014, the 26th meeting of the CGPM took place in Versailles from 13 to 16 November 2018, and the 27th meeting of the CGPM took place from 15 to 18 November 2022. The 28th meeting of the CGPM took place from 13 to 15 October 2026.

== Establishment ==
On 20 May 1875 an international treaty known as the Convention du Mètre (Metre Convention) was signed by 17 states. This treaty established an international organization, the Bureau international des poids et mesures (BIPM), which has two governing organs:

- Conférence générale des poids et mesures (CGPM), a plenary meeting of official delegates of member states which is the supreme authority for all actions;
- Comité international des poids et mesures (CIPM), consisting of elected scientists and metrologists, which prepares and executes the decisions of the CGPM and is responsible for the supervision of the organization.

The organization has a permanent laboratory and secretariat function (sometimes referred to as the Headquarters), the activities of which include the establishment of the basic standards and scales of the principal physical quantities and maintenance of the international prototype standards.

The CGPM acts on behalf of the governments of its members. In so doing, it elects members to the CIPM, receives reports from the CIPM which it passes on to the governments and national laboratories on member states, examines and where appropriate approves proposals from the CIPM in respect of changes to the International System of Units (SI), approves the budget for the BIPM (over €13 million in 2018) and it decides all major issues concerning the organization and development of the BIPM.

The structure is analogous to that of a stock corporation. The BIPM is the organization, the CGPM is the general meeting of the shareholders, the CIPM is the board of directors appointed by the CGPM, and the staff at the site in Saint-Cloud perform the day-to-day work.

=== Membership criteria ===
The CGPM recognises two classes of membership – full membership for those states that wish to participate in the activities of the BIPM and associate membership for those countries or economies (Note: As of 2012, the only "economy" that was an associate member was CARICOM (Caribbean Community) – its membership comprising Antigua and Barbuda, Saint Kitts and Nevis, Barbados, Saint Lucia, Belize, Saint Vincent and the Grenadines, Dominica, Suriname, Grenada, Trinidad and Tobago and Guyana. Jamaica, although also a member of CARICOM, is an associate of the CGPM in its own right.) that only wish to participate in the CIPM MRA program. Associate members have observer status at the CGPM. Since all formal liaison between the convention organizations and national governments is handled by the member state's ambassador to France, (Note: In the case of France, the French Foreign Minister) it is implicit that member states must have diplomatic relations with France, though during both world wars, nations that were at war with France retained their membership of the CGPM. CGPM meetings are chaired by the Président de l'Académie des Sciences de Paris.

Of the twenty countries that attended the Conference of the Metre in 1875, representatives of seventeen signed the convention on 20 May 1875. (Note: Argentina, Austria-Hungary, Belgium, Brazil, Denmark, France, German Empire, Italy, Peru, Portugal, Russia, Spain, Sweden and Norway, Switzerland, Ottoman Empire, United States and Venezuela.) In April 1884, H. J. Chaney, Warden of Standards in London unofficially contacted the BIPM inquiring whether the BIPM would calibrate some metre standards that had been manufactured in the United Kingdom. Broch, director of the BIPM replied that he was not authorised to perform any such calibrations for non-member states. On 17 September 1884, the British Government signed the convention on behalf of the United Kingdom. This number grew to 21 in 1900, 32 in 1950, and 49 in 2001. As of 18 November 2022, there are 64 Member States and 37 Associate States and Economies of the General Conference (with year of partnership in parentheses):

==== Member states ====
Argentina (1877)
Australia (1947)
Austria (1875) (Note: Joined originally as Austria-Hungary)
Belarus (2020)
Belgium (1875)
Brazil (1921)
Bulgaria (1911)
Canada (1907)
Chile (1908)
China (1977)
Colombia (2012)
Costa Rica (2022)
Croatia (2008)
Czech Republic (1922) (Note: Joined originally as part of Czechoslovakia)
Denmark (1875)
Ecuador (2019)
Egypt (1962)
Estonia (2021)
Finland (1913)
France (1875)
Germany (1875) (Note: Joined originally as the German Empire)
Greece (2001)
Hungary (1925)
India (1880)
Indonesia (1960)
Iran (1975)
Iraq (2013)
Ireland (1925)
Israel (1985)
Italy (1875)
Japan (1885)
Kazakhstan (2008)
Kenya (2010)
Lithuania (2015)
Malaysia (2001)
Mexico (1890)
Montenegro (2018)
Morocco (2019)
Netherlands (1929)
New Zealand (1991)
Norway (1875) (Note: Joined originally as part of Sweden and Norway)
Pakistan (1973)
Poland (1925)
Portugal (1876)
Romania (1884)
Russia (1875) (Note: Joined originally as the Russian Empire)
Saudi Arabia (2011)
Serbia (2001)
Singapore (1994)
Slovakia (1922)
Slovenia (2016)
South Africa (1964)
South Korea (1959)
Spain (1875)
Sweden (1875)
Switzerland (1875)
Thailand (1912)
Tunisia (2012)
Turkey (1875) (Note: Joined originally as the Ottoman Empire)
Ukraine (2018)
United Arab Emirates (2015)
United Kingdom (1884)
United States (1878)
Uruguay (1908)

===== Former members =====
Cameroon (1970–2012)
Dominican Republic (1954–2015)
North Korea (1982–2012)
Peru (1875–1956)
Venezuela (1879–1907, 1960–2018)

==== Associates ====
At the 21st meeting of the CGPM in October 1999, the category of "associate" was created for states not yet BIPM members and for economic unions.

Albania (2007)
Azerbaijan (2015)
Bangladesh (2010)
Bolivia (2008)
Bosnia and Herzegovina (2011)
Botswana (2012)
Cambodia (2021)
Caribbean Community (2005)
Chinese Taipei (2002)
Cuba (2000)
Ethiopia (2018)
Georgia (2008)
Ghana (2009)
Hong Kong (2000)
Jamaica (2003)
Kuwait (2018)
Latvia (2001)
Luxembourg (2014)
Malta (2001)
Mauritius (2010)
Moldova (2007)
Mongolia (2013)
Namibia (2012)
North Macedonia (2006)
Oman (2012)
Panama (2003)
Paraguay (2009)
Peru (2009)
Philippines (2002)
Qatar (2016)
Sri Lanka (2007)
Syria (2012)
Tanzania (2018)
Uzbekistan (2018)
Vietnam (2003)
Zambia (2010)
Zimbabwe (2010–2020, 2022)

===== Former associates =====
Seychelles (2010–2021)
Sudan (2014–2021)

== CGPM meetings ==
1st (1889)	The international prototype of the kilogram (IPK), a cylinder made of platinum–iridium, and the international prototype of the metre, an X-cross-section bar also made from platinum–iridium, were selected from batches manufactured by the British firm Johnson Matthey. Working copies of both artifacts were also selected by lot and other copies distributed to member nations, again by lot. The prototypes and working copies were deposited at the International Bureau of Weights and Measures (Bureau international des poids et mesures), Saint-Cloud, France.
2nd (1895)	No resolutions were passed by the 2nd CGPM.
3rd (1901)	The litre was redefined as volume of 1 kg of water. Clarified that kilograms are units of mass, "standard weight" defined, standard acceleration of gravity defined endorsing use of grams force and making them well-defined.
4th (1907)	The carat was defined as 200 mg.
5th (1913)	The International Temperature Scale was proposed. The General Conference recommended that the International Committee authorize the Bureau to organize, between establishments possessing a calibration base, the circulation, in groups, of well-defined invar threads, with a view to enabling agreement to be reached on the method of determining these bases, as well as the method of using the threads.
6th (1921)	The Metre Convention revised.
7th (1927)	The Consultative Committee for Electricity (CCE) created.
8th (1933)	The need for absolute electrical unit identified.
9th (1948)	The ampere, bar, coulomb, farad, henry, joule, newton, ohm, volt, watt, weber were defined. The degree Celsius was selected from three names in use as the name of the unit of temperature. The symbol l (lowercase L) was adopted as symbol for litre. Both the comma and dot on a line are accepted as decimal marker symbols. Symbols for the stere and second changed. The universal return to the Long Scale numbering system was proposed but not adopted.
10th (1954)	The kelvin, standard atmosphere defined. Work on the International System of Units (metre, kilogram, second, ampere, kelvin, candela) began.
11th (1960)	The metre was redefined in terms of wavelengths of light. The units hertz, lumen, lux, tesla were adopted. The new MKSA-based metric system given the official symbol SI for Système International d'Unités and launched as the "modernized metric system". The prefixes pico-, nano-, micro-, mega-, giga- and tera- were confirmed.
12th (1964)	The original definition of litre = 1 dm^{3} restored. The prefixes atto- and femto- were adopted.
13th (1967)	The second was redefined as duration of 9 192 631 770 periods of the radiation corresponding to the transition between the two hyperfine levels of the ground state of the caesium-133 atom at a temperature of 0 K. The Degree Kelvin renamed kelvin and the candela redefined.
14th (1971)	A new SI base unit, the mole defined. The names pascal and siemens as units of pressure and electrical conductance were approved.
15th (1975)	The prefixes peta- and exa- were adopted. The units gray and becquerel were adopted as radiological units within SI.
16th (1979)	The candela and sievert were defined. Both l and L provisionally allowed as symbols for litre.
17th (1983)	The metre was redefined in terms of the speed of light, i.e. The metre is the length of the path travelled by light in vacuum during a time interval of 1/299,792,458 of a second.
18th (1987)	Conventional values were adopted for Josephson constant, K_{J}, and von Klitzing constant, R_{K}, preparing the way for alternative definitions of the ampere and kilogram.
19th (1991)	New prefixes yocto-, zepto-, zetta- and yotta- were adopted.
20th (1995)	The SI supplementary units (radian and steradian) become derived units.
21st (1999)	A new SI derived unit, the katal = mole per second, was adopted as the SI unit of catalytic activity.
22nd (2003)	A comma or a dot on a line are reaffirmed as decimal marker symbols, and not as grouping symbols in order to facilitate reading; "numbers may be divided in groups of three in order to facilitate reading; neither dots nor commas are ever inserted in the spaces between groups".
23rd (2007)	The definition of the kelvin was clarified and thoughts about possible revision of certain base units discussed.
24th (2011)	Proposal to revise the definitions of the SI units, including redefining the kilogram in relation to the Planck constant were accepted in principle, subject to certain technical criteria having been met.
25th (2014)	Redefining the kilogram in relation to the Planck constant was discussed but not decided on. Progress towards realising the redefinition has been noted. However, it was concluded that the data did not yet appear to be sufficiently robust. Continued effort on improving the data has been encouraged, such that a resolution that would replace the current definition with the revised definition can be adopted at the 26th meeting.
26th (2018)	The kilogram, ampere, kelvin, and mole were redefined at this meeting, in terms new permanently fixed values of the Planck constant, elementary charge, Boltzmann constant and Avogadro constant, respectively.
27th (2022)	New prefixes quecto-, ronto-, ronna-, and quetta- were adopted. Planning was begun to eliminate the leap second and stabilize DUT1 by 2035.
28th (2026)	The BIPM invited additional states and intergovernmental organizations to join as observers. Leap seconds were officially abolished starting from 20 May 2027, so UTC would run continuously instead.

== International Committee for Weights and Measures ==
The International Committee for Weights and Measures consists of eighteen persons, each of a different nationality. elected by the General Conference on Weights and Measures (CGPM) whose principal task is to promote worldwide uniformity in units of measurement by taking direct action or by submitting proposals to the CGPM.

The CIPM meets every year (since 2011 in two sessions per year) at the Pavillon de Breteuil where, among other matters, it discusses reports presented to it by its Consultative Committees. Reports of the meetings of the CGPM, the CIPM, and all the Consultative Committees, are published by the BIPM.

=== Mission ===
The secretariat is based in Saint-Cloud, Hauts-de-Seine, France.

In 1999, the CIPM has established the CIPM Arrangement de reconnaissance mutuelle (Mutual Recognition Arrangement, MRA), which serves as the framework for the mutual acceptance of national measurement standards and for recognition of the validity of calibration and measurement certificates issued by national metrology institutes.

A recent focus area of the CIPM has been the revision of the SI.

=== Consultative committees ===
The CIPM has set up a number of consultative committees (CC) to assist it in its work. These committees are under the authority of the CIPM. The president of each committee, who is expected to take the chair at CC meetings, is usually a member of the CIPM. Apart from the CCU, membership of a CC is open to National Metrology Institutes (NMIs) of Member States that are recognized internationally as most expert in the field. NMIs from Member States that are active in the field, but lack the expertise to become Members, are able to attend CC meetings as observers.

These committees are:

- CCAUV: Consultative Committee for Acoustics, Ultrasound and Vibration
- CCEM: Consultative Committee for Electricity and Magnetism
- CCL: Consultative Committee for Length
- CCM: Consultative Committee for Mass and Related Quantities
- CCPR: Consultative Committee for Photometry and Radiometry
- CCQM: Consultative Committee for Amount of Substance – Metrology in Chemistry and Biology
- CCRI: Consultative Committee for Ionizing Radiation
- CCT: Consultative Committee for Thermometry
- CCTF: Consultative Committee for Time and Frequency
- CCU: Consultative Committee for Units

The CCU's role is to advise on matters related to the development of the SI and the preparation of the SI brochure. It has liaison with other international bodies such as International Organization for Standardization (ISO), International Astronomical Union (IAU), International Union of Pure and Applied Chemistry (IUPAC), International Union of Pure and Applied Physics (IUPAP) and International Commission on Illumination (CIE). (Note: This is an incomplete list.)

=== Major reports ===
Official reports of the CIPM include:

- Reports of CIPM meetings (Procès-Verbaux) (CIPM Minutes)
- Annual Report to Governments on the financial and administrative situation of the BIPM
- Notification of the contributive parts of the Contracting States
- Convocation to meetings of the CGPM
- Report of the President of the CIPM to the CGPM

From time to time the CIPM has been charged by the CGPM to undertake major investigations related to activities affecting the CGPM or the BIPM. Reports produced include:

==== The Blevin Report ====
The Blevin Report, published in 1998, examined the state of worldwide metrology. The report originated from a resolution passed at the 20th CGPM (October 1995) which committed the CIPM to

study and report on the long-term national and international needs relating to metrology, the appropriate international collaborations and the unique role of the BIPM to meet these needs, and the financial and other commitments that will be required from the Member States in the coming decades.

The report identified, amongst other things, a need for closer cooperation between the BIPM and other organizations such as International Organization of Legal Metrology (OIML) and International Laboratory Accreditation Cooperation (ILAC) with clearly defined boundaries and interfaces between the organizations. Another major finding was the need for cooperation between accreditation laboratories and the need to involve developing countries in the world of metrology.

==== The Kaarls Report ====
The Kaarls Report published in 2003 examined the role of the BIPM in the evolving needs for metrology in trade, industry and society.

==== SI brochure ====
The CIPM has responsibility for commissioning the SI brochure, which is the formal definition of the International system of units. The brochure is produced by the CCU in conjunction with a number of other international organizations. Initially the brochure was only in French – the official language of the metre convention, but recent versions have been published simultaneously in both English and French, with the French text being the official text. The 6th edition was published in 1991, the 7th edition was published in 1998, and the 8th, in 2006. The most recent edition is the 9th edition, originally published as version 1 in 2019 to include the 2019 revision of the SI (a.k.a. "new SI"); it was updated to version 2 in December 2022 to include the new SI prefixes ronna-, quetta-, ronto- and quecto- introduced in November 2022.

== See also ==
- History of the metre
- Institute for Reference Materials and Measurements (IRMM)
- National Institute of Standards and Technology (NIST)
- National Conference on Weights and Measures (NCWM) United States
- Outline of the metric system
- Seconds pendulum
