= Mahmud Ahmad Hamdi al-Falaki =

Egyptian scientist

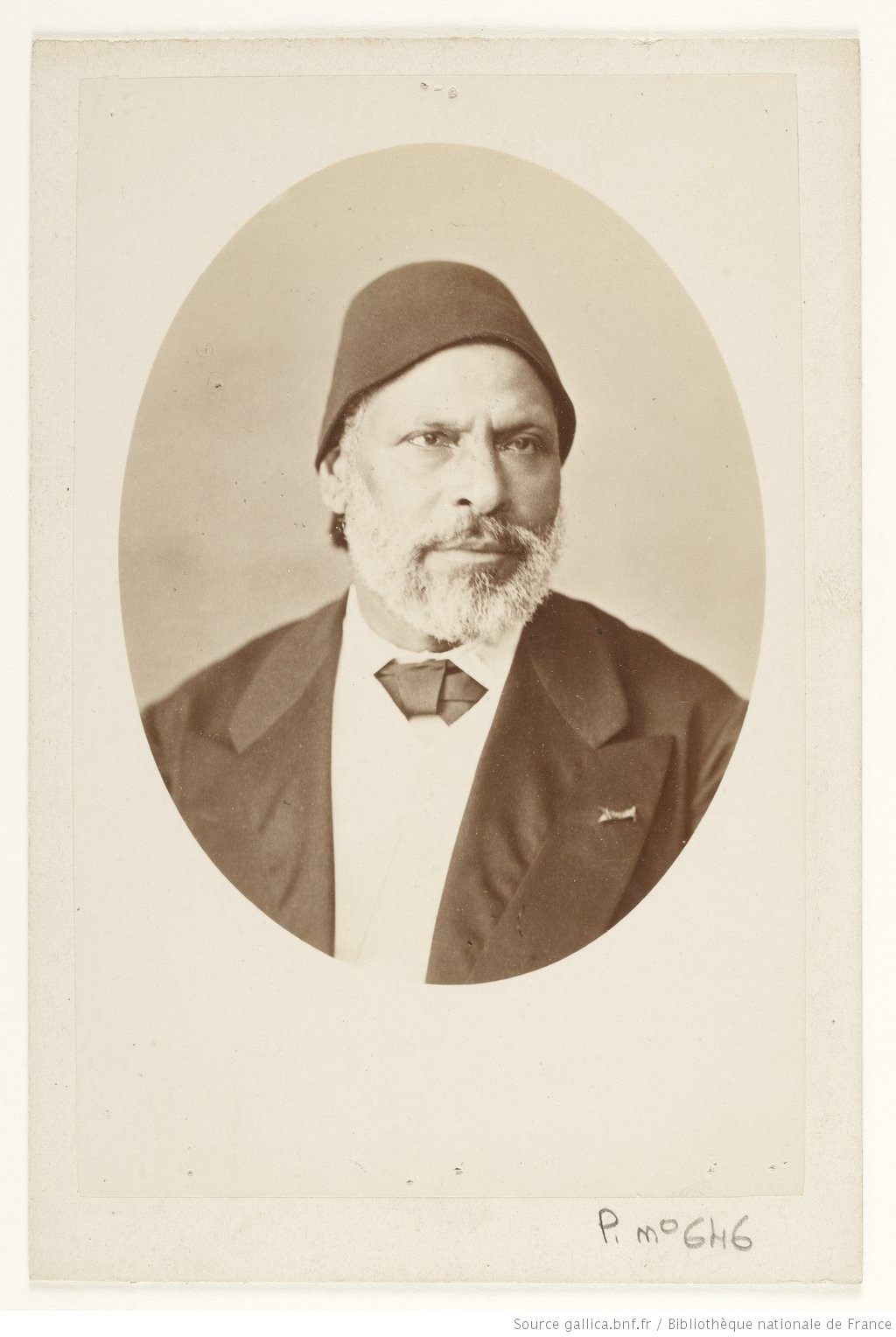
- Born: Mahmud; 1815
- Died: 1885 (aged 69–70); Cairo
- Burial place: Mausoleum of Imam al-Shafi'i
- Citizenship: Ottoman Empire
- Occupation: cartographer astronomer engineer

Mahmud Ahmad Hamdi al-Falaki (1815-19 July 1885) was an Egyptian engineer, mathematician and scientist. He was born in al-Hissa, Gharbia Governorate.

He was Egypt's representative at the Third International Geographical Congress and Exhibition, Venice, Italy, 1881. Mahmud Ahmad Hamdi al-Falaki also excavated and surveyed Alexandria in 1866 for producing a plan of the ancient town. His plan was later dismissed in the English speaking world as unreliable (while continental European archeologists and historians used it). Recent discoveries confirmed that the plan made by Mahmud Ahmad Hamdi al-Falaki is reliable.

== Bibliography ==
- Crozet, Pascal. 'La trajectoire d’un scientifique égyptien au xixe siècle: Mahmûd al-Falakî (1815-1885)' In: Entre réforme sociale et mouvement national: Identité et modernisation en Égypte (1882-1962) [online]. Le Caire: CEDEJ - Égypte/Soudan, 1995 (generated 29 juin 2020). Available on the Internet. ISBN 978-2905838704. DOI: https://doi.org/10.4000/books.cedej.1420.
- Stolz, Daniel A, The Lighthouse and the Observatory - Islam, Science, and Empire in Late Ottoman Egypt, Cambridge University Press. Online publication date: December 2017, Print publication year: 2018. Online ISBN 9781108164672
