= Louis Puissant =

French topographical engineer, geodesist, and mathematician

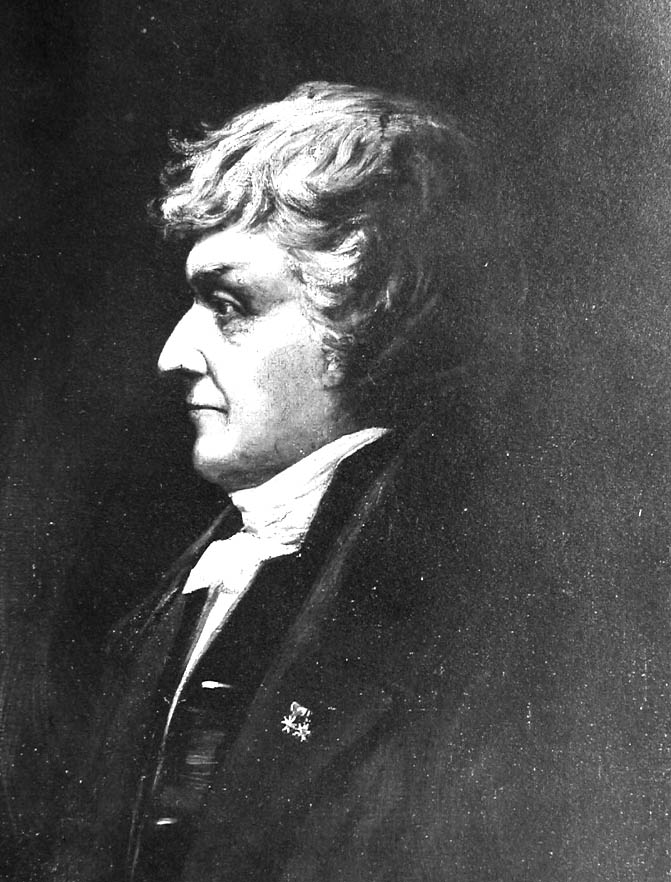
- Born: 22 September 1769; Le Châtelet-en-Brie, France
- Died: 10 January 1843 (aged 73); Paris, France
- Occupations: topographical engineer, geodesist, and mathematician
- Spouses: Françoise Coutet
- Children: Louis (1793–1836)

Louis Puissant (22 September 1769, in Le Châtelet-en-Brie – 10 January 1843, in Paris) was a French topographical engineer, geodesist, and mathematician.

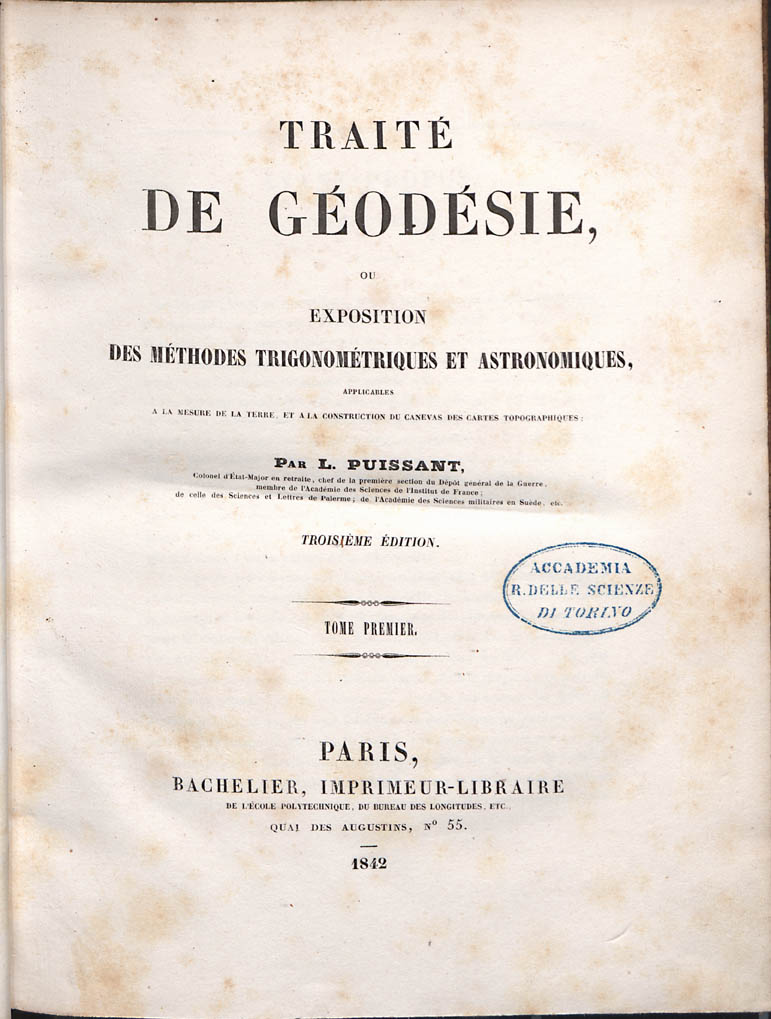
Traité de géodésie, 1842

He was appointed an officer in the corps of topographical engineers (ingénieurs géographes) of l'armée des Pyrénées occidentales in 1792 and then a professor in l’école centrale d'Agen in 1796. From October 1802 to August 1803, he was in charge of geodesic triangulations on the island of Elba and then in 1803–1804 in Lombardy. He was elected a member of l'Société Philomathique de Paris in 1810 and a member of l'Académie des sciences in 1828.

In addition to numerous scientific memoirs, he was the author of several books on geodesy and mathematics.

His marriage to Françoise Coutet produced a son, Louis (1793–1836), who graduated from l'École polytechnique.

== Principal publications ==
- Recueil de diverses propositions de géométrie, résolues ou démontrées par l'analyse algébrique, suivant les principes de Monge et de Lacroix, à l'usage de ceux qui suivent le traité élémentaire d'application de l'algèbre à la géométrie de ce dernier (1801)
- Traité de géodésie ou exposition des méthodes astronomiques et trigonométriques, appliquées soit à la mesure de la terre, soit à la confection du canevas des cartes et des plans (1805)
- Traité de topographie, d'arpentage et de nivellement (1807)
- Cours de mathématiques à l'usage des écoles impériales militaires (1809)
- Supplément au second livre du Traité de topographie, contenant la théorie des projections des cartes (1810)
- Supplément au Traité de géodésie (1827)
- Nouvelle Description géométrique de la France (2 volumes, 1832–1840)
- Traité de géodésie (in French). Vol. 1. Paris: Charles Louis Étienne Bachelier. 1842.
- Traité de géodésie (in French). Vol. 2. Paris: Charles Louis Étienne Bachelier. 1842.
