= International Bureau of Weights and Measures =

Intergovernmental organisation

- Bureau International des Poids et Mesures

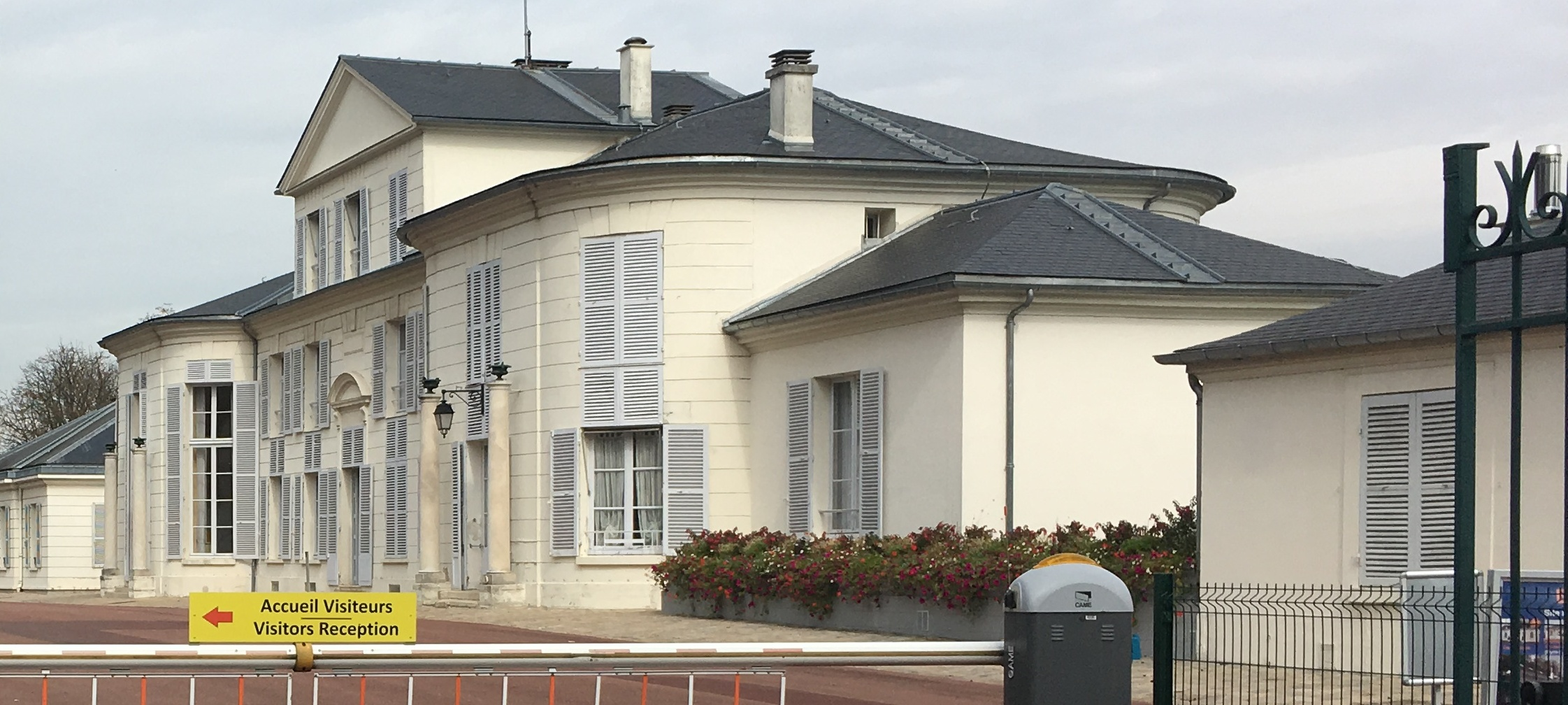
- Pavillon de Breteuil in 2017
- Abbreviation: BIPM (from French name)
- Formation: 20 May 1875; 151 years ago
- Type: Intergovernmental
- Location: Pavillon de Breteuil, Saint-Cloud, France
- Coordinates: 48°49′45″N 2°13′12″E
- Region served: Worldwide
- Members: 67 member states 36 associate states (See the list)
- Official language: French; English
- Director: Annette Koo
- Website: BIPM.org

The International Bureau of Weights and Measures (French: Bureau international des poids et mesures, BIPM) is an intergovernmental organisation (IGO), through which its 67 member-states act on measurement standards in areas such as chemistry, ionising radiation, physical metrology, as well as the International System of Units (SI) and Coordinated Universal Time (UTC). It is headquartered in the Pavillon de Breteuil in Saint-Cloud, near Paris, France. The organisation has been referred to as IBWM (from its name in English) in older literature. (Note: English translations by government agencies have used the initialism IBWM in documentation.)

== Function ==
The BIPM has the mandate to provide the basis for a single, coherent system of measurements throughout the world, traceable to the International System of Units (SI). This task takes many forms, from direct dissemination of units to coordination through international comparisons of national measurement standards (as in electricity and ionising radiation).

Following consultation, a draft version of the BIPM Work Programme is presented at each meeting of the General Conference for consideration with the BIPM budget. The final programme of work is determined by the CIPM in accordance with the budget agreed to by the CGPM.

Currently, the BIPM's main work includes:

- Publishing definitive information about the International System of Units
- Scientific and technical activities carried out in its four departments: chemistry, ionising radiation, physical metrology, and time
- Liaison and coordination work, including providing the secretariat for the CIPM Consultative Committees and some of their Working Groups and for the CIPM MRA, and providing institutional liaison with the other bodies supporting the international quality infrastructure and other international bodies
- Capacity building and knowledge transfer programs to increase the effectiveness within the worldwide metrology community of those Member State and Associates with emerging metrology systems
- A resource centre providing a database and publications for international metrology

The BIPM is one of the twelve member organisations of the International Network on Quality Infrastructure (INetQI), which promotes and implements QI activities in metrology, accreditation, standardisation and conformity assessment.

The BIPM has an important role in maintaining accurate worldwide time of day. It combines, analyses, and averages the official atomic time standards of member nations around the world to create a single, official Coordinated Universal Time (UTC).

== Structure ==
The BIPM has a supervisory board called the International Committee for Weights and Measures (French: Comité international des poids et mesures, CIPM), a committee of eighteen members that meet normally in two sessions per year, which is in turn overseen by the General Conference on Weights and Measures (French: Conférence générale des poids et mesures, CGPM) that meets in Paris usually once every four years, consisting of delegates of the governments of the Member States and observers from the Associates of the CGPM. These organs are also commonly referred to by their French initialisms.

== History ==
The creation of the International Bureau of Weights and Measures followed the Metre Convention of 1875, after the Franco-Prussian War (1870–1871), at the initiative of the International Geodetic Association. This process began with the 1855 Paris Exposition, shortly after the Great Exhibition, when the need for international standardisation of weights and measures became apparent. During the process of unification of Germany, geodesists called for the establishment of an International Bureau of Weights and Measures in Europe. These trends culminated in the 1889 General Conference on Weights and Measures, with the distribution of the metre and kilogram standards to the States parties to the Metre Convention.

When the metre was adopted as an international unit of length, it was well known that it no longer corresponded to its historical definition. Carlos Ibáñez e Ibáñez de Ibero, first president of both the International Geodetic Association and the International Committee for Weights and Measures, took part to the remeasurement and extension of the arc measurement of Delambre and Méchain. At that time, mathematicians like Legendre and Gauss had developed new methods for processing data, including the least squares method which allowed to compare experimental data tainted with observational errors to a mathematical model. Moreover, the International Bureau of Weights and Measures would have a central role for international geodetic measurements as Charles Édouard Guillaume's discovery of invar, an especially temperature-stable nickel-iron alloy, minimised the impact of measurement inaccuracies due to temperature observational errors.

=== Geodetic standards and the Expositions Universelles (1855 and 1867) ===
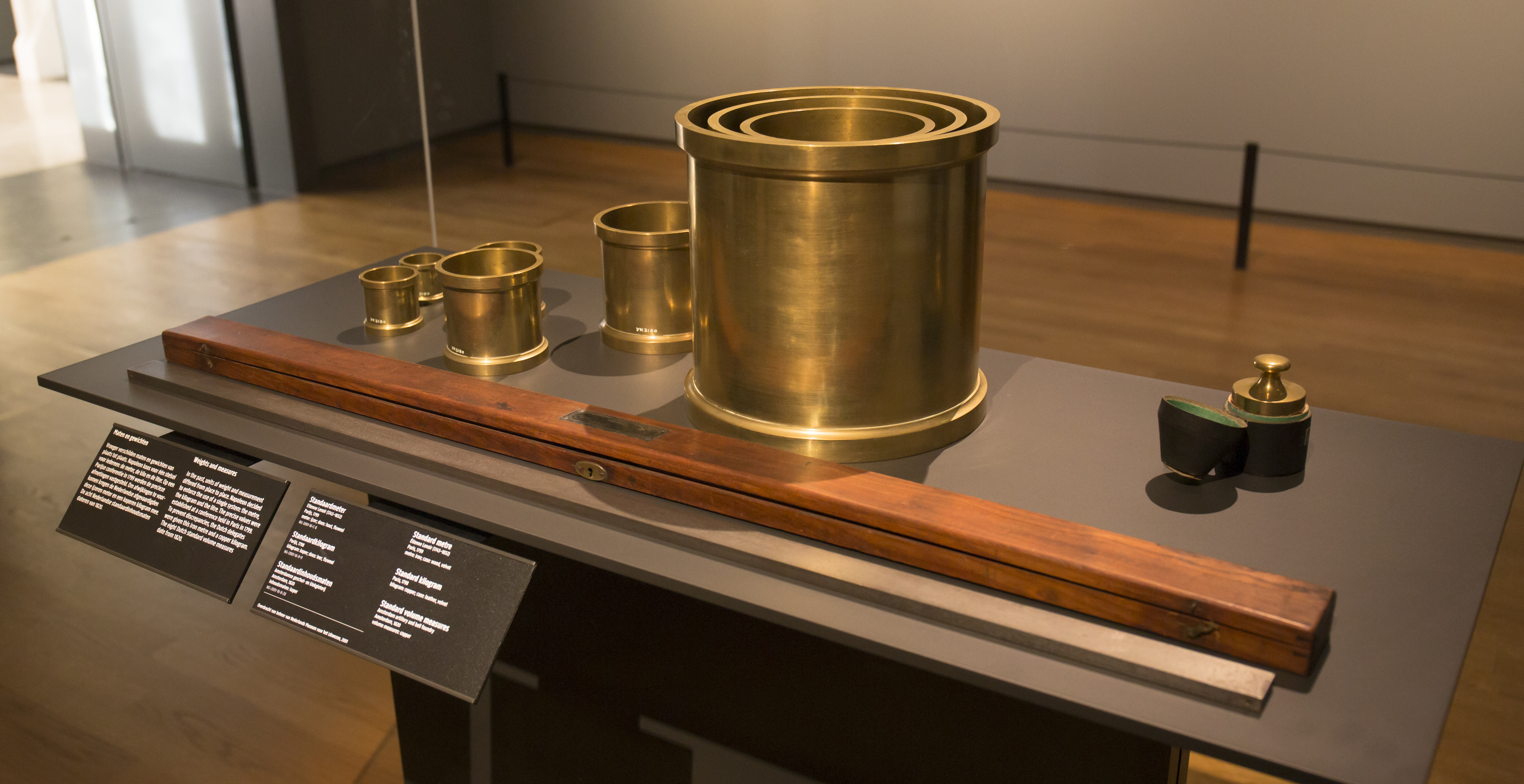
Replicas of historical metric standards, including an iron copy of the mètre des Archives.

In the 19th century, units of measurement were defined by primary standards, and unique artefacts made of different alloys with distinct coefficients of expansion were the legal basis of units of length. A wrought iron ruler, the Toise of Peru, also called Toise de l'Académie, was the French primary standard of the toise, and the metre was officially defined by an artefact made of platinum kept in the National Archives. Besides the latter, another platinum and twelve iron standards of the metre were made by Étienne Lenoir in 1799. One of them became known as the Committee Meter in the United States and served as standard of length in the United States Coast Survey until 1890.

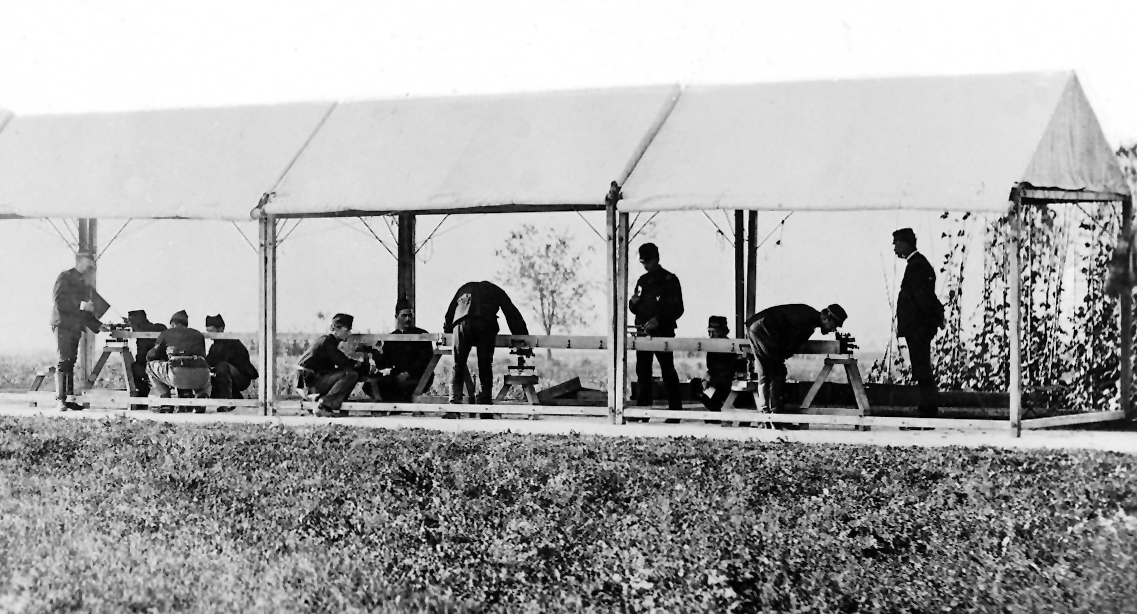
Ibáñez apparatus calibrated on the metric Spanish standard and used by the Swiss Geodetic Commission at Aarberg, in canton of Bern, Switzerland in 1880.

In 1855, the Dufour map (French: Carte Dufour), the first topographic map of Switzerland for which the metre was adopted as the unit of length, won the gold medal at the Exposition Universelle. However, the baselines for this map were measured in 1834 with three toises long measuring rods calibrated on a toise made in 1821 by Jean Nicolas Fortin for Friedrich Georg Wilhelm von Struve.

The geodetic measuring device calibrated on the metre devised by Carlos Ibáñez e Ibáñez de Ibero and Frutos Saavedra Meneses, was displayed by Jean Brunner at the Exhibition. The four-metre-long Spanish measuring instrument, which became known as the Spanish Standard (French: Règle espagnole), was compared with Borda's double-toise N° 1, which served as a comparison module for the measurement of all geodesic bases in France, and was also to be compared to the Ibáñez apparatus. In order to maintain measurement traceability it was important to control the temperature during these intercomparisons in order to avoid systematic errors.

The Earth measurements thus underscored the importance of scientific methods at a time when statistics were implemented in geodesy. As a leading scientist of his time, Carlos Ibáñez e Ibáñez de Ibero was one of the 81 initial members of the International Statistical Institute (ISI) and delegate of Spain to the first ISI session (now called World Statistic Congress) in Rome in 1887. On the sidelines of the Exposition Universelle (1855) and the second Congress of Statistics held in Paris, an association with a view to obtaining a uniform decimal system of measures, weights and currencies was created in 1855. Under the impetus of this association, a Committee for Weights and Measures and Monies (French: Comité des poids, mesures et monnaies) would be created during the Exposition Universelle (1867) in Paris and would call for the international adoption of the metric system.

At the 1867 Universal Exposition in Paris, the Netherlands, Switzerland, Russia, the United States and Spain were respectively represented by Edouard Henri von Baumhauer, Carl Feer-Herzog, Moritz von Jacobi, Samuel B. Ruggles, and Ramón de la Sagra on the Weights and Measures and Currency Committee of the Association for the Promotion of the Metric System, which was presided by Claude-Louis Mathieu, with Edmond Becquerel as vice-president, Leone Levi and Henri Baudrillart as secretaries. The Committee was composed of representatives from France, the Netherlands, Belgium, Prussia and the North German Confederation, South German States, Austria, Switzerland, Spain, Denmark, Sweden and Norway, Russia, Italy, the Ottoman Empire, Egypt, Japan and China, Morocco and Tunis, Brazil, the United States of America, and the United Kingdom of Great Britain and Ireland.

=== The metre and Struve Geodetic Arc (1816/1855) ===
In 1858, a Technical Commission was set up to continue cadastral surveying inaugurated under Muhammad Ali. This Commission suggested to buy geodetic devices which were ordered in France. Mohammed Sa'id Pasha entrusted to Ismail Mustafa al-Falaki the study of the precision apparatus calibrated against the metre intended to measure geodetic baselines and built by Jean Brunner in Paris. Ismail Mustafa had the task to carry out the experiments necessary for determining the expansion coefficients of the two platinum and brass bars, and to compare the Egyptian standard with a known standard. The Spanish standard designed by Carlos Ibáñez e Ibáñez de Ibero and Frutos Saavedra Meneses was chosen for this purpose, as it had served as a model for the construction of the Egyptian standard.

Metre Convention signatories

It was not until 1954 that the connection of the southerly extension of the Struve Geodetic Arc, a chain of survey triangulations stretching from Hammerfest in Norway to the Black Sea, with an arc running northwards from South Africa through Egypt would bring the course of a major meridian arc back to land where Eratosthenes had founded geodesy. The Struve Geodetic arc measurement extended on a period of forty years and initiated an international scientific collaboration between Russian Empire and the United Kingdoms of Sweden and Norway with the involvement of proeminent astronomers such as Friedrich Georg Wilhelm von Struve, Friedrich Wilhelm Bessel, Carl Friedrich Gauss and George Biddell Airy. A French scientific instrument maker, Jean Nicolas Fortin, made three direct copies of the Toise of Peru, one for Friedrich Georg Wilhelm von Struve, a second for Heinrich Christian Schumacher in 1821 and a third for Friedrich Wilhelm Bessel in 1823. In 1831, Henri-Prudence Gambey also realised a copy of the Toise of Peru which was kept at Altona Observatory in Hamburg.

According to geodesists, these standards were secondary standards deduced from the Toise of Peru. In continental Europe, except Spain, surveyors continued to use measuring instruments calibrated on the Toise of Peru. Among these, the toise of Bessel and the apparatus of Borda were respectively the main references for geodesy in Prussia and in France. These measuring devices consisted of bimetallic rulers in platinum and brass or iron and zinc fixed together at one extremity to assess the variations in length produced by any change in temperature. The combination of two bars made of two different metals allowed to take thermal expansion into account without measuring the temperature. The Spanish Standard, which would be retained as the fundamental standard of the metre in Spain until the reception of the international prototypes of the metre, was itself calibrated on the Borda Toise.

=== Metric act of 1866 and calls for an international standard unit of length ===
In 1866, Ferdinand Rudolph Hassler's use of the metre and the creation of the Office of Standard Weights and Measures as an office within the Coast Survey contributed to the introduction of the Metric Act of 1866 allowing the use of the metre in the United States, and preceded the choice of the metre as international scientific unit of length and the proposal by the 1867 General Conference of the European Arc Measurement (German: Europäische Gradmessung) to establish the International Bureau of Weights and Measures. Moreover, it was asserted that the Toise of Peru, the standard of the toise constructed in 1735 for the French Geodesic Mission to the Equator, might be so much damaged that comparison with it would be worthless, while Bessel had questioned the accuracy of copies of this standard belonging to Altona and Koenigsberg Observatories, which he had compared to each other about 1840.

This assertion was particularly worrying, because when the primary Imperial yard standard had partially been destroyed in 1834, a new standard of reference was constructed using copies of the "Standard Yard, 1760", instead of the pendulum's length as provided for in the Weights and Measures Act 1824, because the pendulum method proved unreliable.

=== International Geodetic Association ===
The intimate relationships that necessarily existed between metrology and geodesy explain that the Central European Arc Measurement, founded to combine the geodetic operations of different countries, in order to reach a new and more exact determination of the shape and dimensions of the Globe, prompted the project of reforming the foundations of the metric system, while expanding it and making it international. Not, as it was mistakenly assumed for a certain time, that the Association had the unscientific thought of modifying the length of the metre, in order to conform exactly to its historical definition according to the new values that would be found for the terrestrial meridian. But, busy combining the arcs measured in the different countries and connecting the neighbouring triangulations, geodesists encountered, as one of the main difficulties, the unfortunate uncertainty which reigned over the equations of the units of length used. Adolphe Hirsch, General Baeyer and Colonel Ibáñez decided, in order to make all the standards comparable, to propose to the Association to choose the metre for geodetic unit, and to create an international prototype metre differing as little as possible from the mètre des Archives.

In 1867 at the second General Conference of the International Association of Geodesy held in Berlin, the question of an international standard unit of length was discussed in order to combine the measurements made in different countries to determine the size and shape of the Earth. According to a preliminary proposal made in Neuchâtel the precedent year, the General Conference recommended the adoption of the metre in replacement of the toise of Bessel, the creation of an International Metre Commission, and the foundation of a World institute for the comparison of geodetic standards, the first step towards the creation of the International Bureau of Weights and Measures.

=== Saint Petersburg Academy ===
Ferdinand Rudolph Hassler's metrological and geodetic work also had a favourable response in Russia. Heinrich von Wild is another example illustrating the role played by Swiss scientists in the creation of the International Bureau of Weights and Measures. The Swiss physicist and meteorologist was delegated by Russia to the International Metre Commission in 1870, to the Diplomatic Conference of 1875, and, after the signing of the Metre Convention, to the International Committee for Weights and Measures. He was director of the Swiss Federal Institute of Metrology (METAS) since 1864. In 1879, he would become the first president of the International Meteorological Organization.

In 1869, the Saint Petersburg Academy of Sciences sent to the French Academy of Sciences a report drafted by Otto Wilhelm von Struve, Heinrich von Wild, and Moritz von Jacobi, whose theorem has long supported the assumption of an ellipsoid with three unequal axes for the figure of the Earth, inviting his French counterpart to undertake joint action to ensure the universal use of the metric system in all scientific work.

The French Academy of Sciences and the Bureau des Longitudes in Paris drew the attention of the French government to this issue. In November 1869, Napoleon III issued invitations to join the International Metre Commission.

=== The International Metre Commission (1870/1872) ===
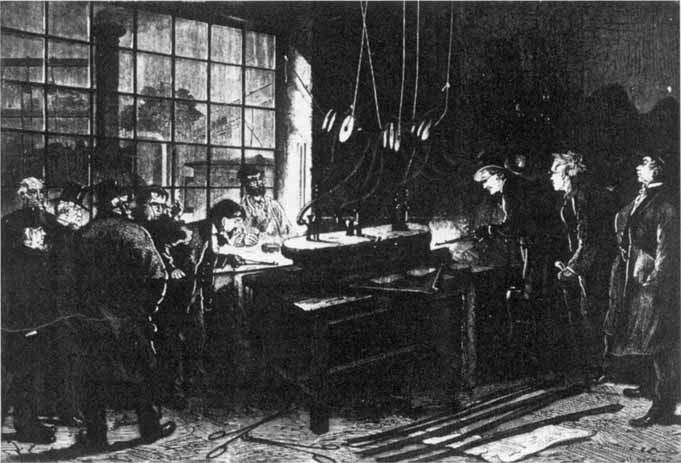
Creating the metre-alloy in 1874 at the Conservatoire des Arts et Métiers. Present Henri Tresca, George Matthey, Saint-Claire Deville, and Debray

The French government gave practical support to the creation of an International Metre Commission, which met in Paris in 1870 and again in 1872 with the participation of about thirty countries. There was much discussion within this commission, considering the opportunity either to keep as definitive the units represented by the standards of the Archives, or to return to the primitive definitions, and to correct the units to bring them closer to them. Since its origin, the metre has kept a double definition; it is both the ten-millionth part of the quarter meridian and the length represented by the Mètre des Archives. The first is historical, the second is metrological. The first solution prevailed, in accordance with common sense and in accordance with the advice of the French Academy of Sciences. Abandoning the values represented by the standards, would have consecrated an extremely dangerous principle, that of the change of units to any progress of measurements; the Metric System would be perpetually threatened with change, that is to say with ruin. Thus the Commission called for the creation of a new international prototype metre which length would be as close as possible to that of the Mètre des Archives and the arrangement of a system where national standards could be compared with it.

At the session on 12 October 1872 of the Permanent Committee of the International Metre Commission, which was to become the International Committee for Weights and Measures, Carlos Ibáñez e Ibáñez de Ibero was elected president. On 19 April 1875, Ibáñez' presidency was confirmed and Adolphe Hirsch was elected secretary of the International Committee for Weights and Measures. On 6 May 1873 during the 6th session of the French section of the Metre Commission, Henri Étienne Sainte-Claire Deville cast a 20-kilogram platinum-iridium ingot from Matthey in his laboratory at the École normale supérieure (Paris). On 13 May 1874, 250 kilograms of platinum-iridium to be used for several national prototypes of the metre was cast at the Conservatoire national des arts et métiers. When a conflict broke out regarding the presence of impurities in the metre-alloy of 1874, a member of the Preparatory Committee since 1870 and president of the Permanent Committee of the International Metre Commission, Carlos Ibáñez e Ibáñez de Ibero intervened with the French Academy of Sciences to rally France to the project to create an International Bureau of Weights and Measures equipped with the scientific means necessary to redefine the units of the metric system according to the progress of sciences. In fact, the chemical analysis of the alloy produced in 1874 by the French section revealed contamination by ruthenium and iron which led the International Committee for Weights and Measures to reject, in 1877, the prototypes produced by the French section from the 1874 alloy. It also seemed at the time that the production of prototypes with an X profile was only possible through the extrusion process, which resulted in iron contamination. However, it soon turned out that the prototypes designed by Henri Tresca could be produced by milling.

=== The 1875 Metre Convention and the founding of the BIPM ===
Seal of the BIPM

The principal tasks facing the delegates at the 1875 conference was the replacement of the existing metre and kilogram artefacts that were held by the French Government and the setting up of an organisation to administer the maintenance of standards around the globe. The conference did not concern itself with other units of measure. The conference had undertones of Franco-German political manoeuvring, particularly since the French had been humiliated by the Prussians during the war a few years previously. Although France lost control of the metric system, they ensured that it passed to international rather than German control and that the international headquarters were in Paris.

Two members of the Permanent Committee of the International Metre Commission, the German astronomer, Wilhelm Julius Foerster, director of the Berlin Observatory and director of the German Weights and Measures Service, and the Swiss geodesist of German origin, Adolphe Hirsch were also among the main architects of the Metre Convention. While the German astronomer Wilhelm Julius Foerster along with the Russian and Austrian representatives boycotted the Permanent Committee of the International Metre Commission in order to prompt the reunion of the Diplomatic Conference of the Metre and to promote the foundation of a permanent International Bureau of Weights and Measures, Adolphe Hirsch, delegate of Switzerland at this Diplomatic Conference in 1875, conformed to the opinion of Italy and Spain to create, in spite of French reluctance, the International Bureau of Weights and Measures in France as a permanent institution at the disadvantage of the Conservatoire national des arts et métiers (CNAM).

Two camps were present. The first advocated for the creation of an International Bureau of Weights and Measures in France. The second favoured maintaining the status quo in favour of the National Conservatory of Arts and Crafts (CNAM). The French delegation itself appeared divided between the Republic's position, which supported the creation of the International Bureau of Weights and Measures, and the French Conservatory, represented by Arthur Morin. Initially, France adopted an officially neutral position, while allowing General Morin to secretly lobby foreign delegations in the Conservatory's interest. A third option was considered: the creation of the International Bureau of Weights and Measures in Switzerland. This option seemed unlikely to succeed from the outset due to the strong support from Spain and Italy for the creation of the International Bureau in Paris. Following an ultimatum from Wilhelm Foerster, the German delegate, the French delegation officially declared its support for the creation of the International Bureau of Weights and Measures.

Spain notably supported France for this outcome and the first president of the International Committee for Weights and Measures, the Spanish geodesist, Carlos Ibáñez e Ibáñez de Ibero received the Grand Officer medal of the Légion d'Honneur for his diplomatic role on this issue and was awarded the Poncelet Prize for his scientific contribution to metrology. Indeed, as Carlos Ibáñez e Ibáñez de Ibero was collaborating with the French on the extension of the arc measurement of Delambre and Méchain since 1853, and was president of both the Permanent Committee of the International Metre Commission since 1872 and the Permanent Commission of the International Association of Geodesy since 1874, he was to play a pivotal role in reconciling French and German interests. The Metre Convention was signed on 20 May 1875 in Paris and the International Bureau of Weights and Measures was created under the supervision of the International Committee for Weights and Measures, presided by Carlos Ibáñez e ibáñez de Ibero.

=== Current state of existing standards ===
We know that the Mètre des Archives is about one-fifth of a millimetre too short compared to its 1791 definition—that is, compared to the true pole-equator distance—but this fact did not trigger the movement that led to a new definition of the metre. Rather, the metrological quality of geodetic standards calibrated on the Toise of Peru was gradually proving insufficient to meet the growing need for accuracy in geodetic measurements.

From geodesists point of view, the Mètre des Archives was a secondary standard deduced from the Toise of Peru. When, in 1799, the results necessary for the practical and definitive realization of the metre were available, the commission in charge of the matter decided to fully utilize the precision of the comparator developed by the engineer Étienne Lenoir. It fixed the length of the definitive metre at 3 feet 11.296 lines (or 443.296 lines). The law of 18 Germinal, Year III (7 April 1795) stipulated that the metre should be drawn on a platinum ruler. Lenoir therefore constructed the prototype of the standard metre according to these criteria. Another platinum standard, as well as twelve other iron standards, were also produced in 1799.

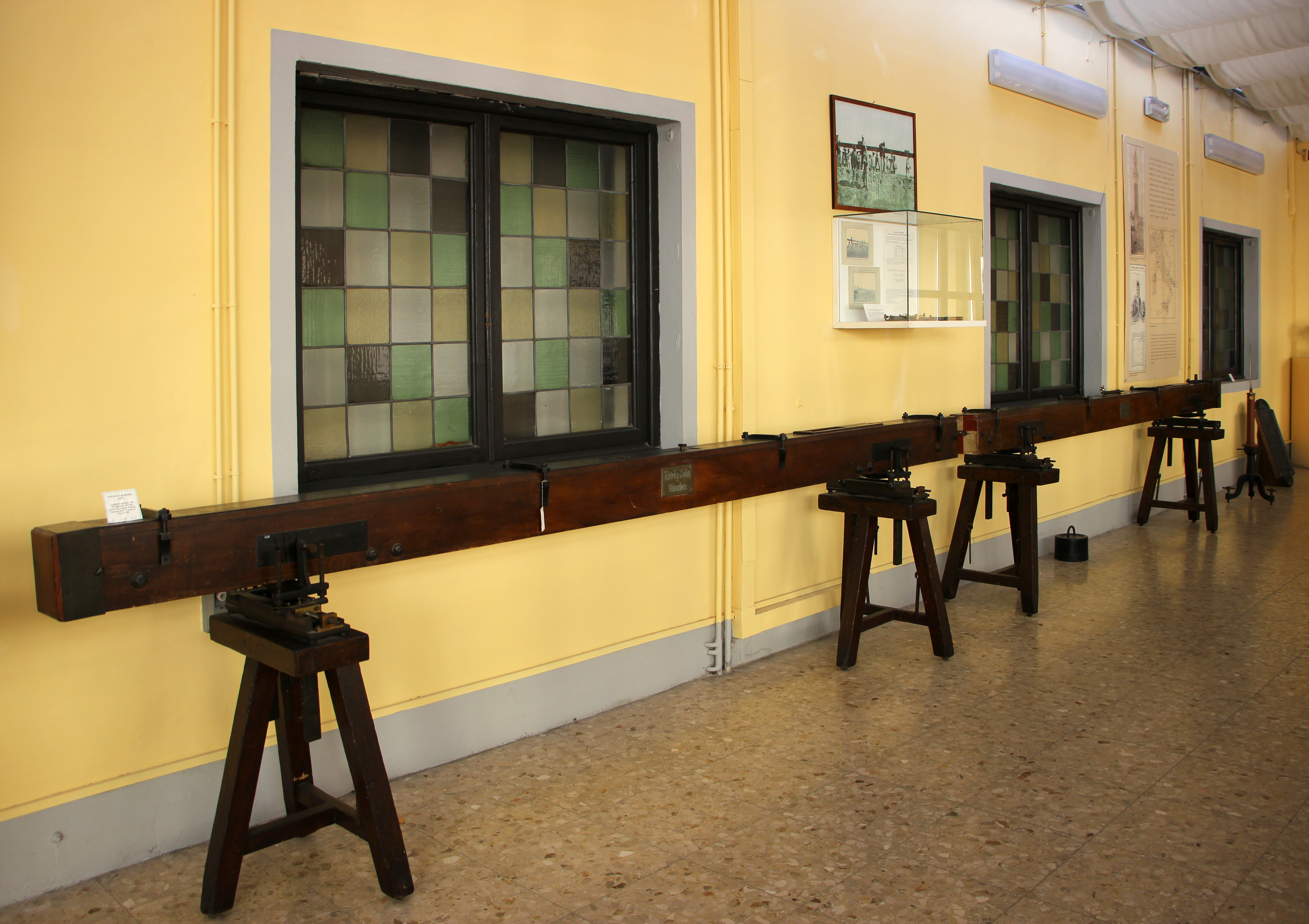
Bessel's apparatus at the Museum of Instruments of the Military Geographic Institute of Florence.

At the first general meeting of the Central European Arc Measurement held in Berlin in 1864, it was decided to adopt the Bessel Toise, a copy of the Toise of Peru made in 1923 by Jean-Nicolas Fortin in Paris, as the international standard. In order to avoid the difficulty in exactly determining the temperature of a bar by the mercury thermometer, Friedrich Wilhelm Bessel, inspired by Jean-Charles de Borda, introduced in 1834 near Königsberg a compound bar which constituted a metallic thermometer. A zinc bar was laid on an iron bar two toises long, both bars being perfectly planed and in free contact, the zinc bar being slightly shorter and the two bars rigidly united at one end. As the temperature varied, the difference of the lengths of the bars, as perceived by the other end, also varied, and afforded a quantitative correction for temperature variations, which was applied to reduce the length to standard temperature. During the measurement of the base line the bars were not allowed to come into contact, the interval being measured by the insertion of glass wedges. The results of the comparisons of four measuring rods with one another and with the standards were elaborately computed by the method of least-squares.These comparisons were essential. Indeed, thermal expansion, which corresponds to the increase in volume of a body caused by heating, was already well known at the time. Pierre Bouguer had demonstrated it to a large audience at the Hôtel des Invalides. This problem has consistently dominated all thinking regarding the measurement of geodetic standards. Geodesists were preoccupied with the constant concern of accurately determining the temperature of the length standards used in the field. Determining this variable, on which the length of measuring instruments depends, has always been considered so complex and so important that one could almost say that the history of geodetic standards corresponds to the history of the precautions taken to avoid temperature errors.

In the 19th century, statisticians knew that scientific observations were subject to two types of error: constant errors and random errors. The effects of the latter could be corrected using the least squares method. Constant errors, on the other hand, had to be carefully avoided, as they were caused by various factors that consistently altered the results of observations in the same direction. These errors thus tended to render the results they affected worthless. Consider, for example, measuring a straight line to determine its length in metres. If a metal ruler is used for this measurement, and an error is made in determining the temperature at which its length corresponds to that of a metre, all observations will be affected by a consistent error stemming from this error, and no matter how many times the operation is repeated, it will be impossible to obtain an accurate result. If, on the contrary, we know exactly the temperature at which the ruler is equivalent to the metre and if the error affects the actual temperature of the ruler in the different observations, each observation will be affected by a random error, but these errors will occur sometimes in one direction and sometimes in the other, and by repeating the operation a large number of times we can hope to eliminate their effect by compensating for them.

In the absence of a standard temperature scale, inconsistencies arose when attempting to link geodetic surveys from different countries to create a European geodetic network. It was thus crucial to compare at controlled temperatures with great precision and to the same unit all the standards for measuring geodetic baselines. In 1886, Adolphe Hisch, secretary of the International Committee for Weights and Measures (CIPM) and of the International Geodetic Association, proposed that all the toises that had served as geodetic standards in Europe during the 19th century be compared at the BIPM with the Toise of Peru and with the new international metre so that the measurements made until then could be used to measure the Earth. The result of these comparisons made it possible to reduce the arcs measured in Germany to the metre. The discordance of 1/(66 000) which remained between the triangles common to the German and French networks could be reduced to 1/(600 000) which was at the limit of accuracy of geodetic surveys at the time. In fact, the length of Bessel's Toise, which according to the then legal ratio between the metre and the Toise of Peru, should be equal to 1.9490348 m, would be found to be 26.2·10^{−6} m greater during measurements carried out by Jean-René Benoît at the BIPM. It was the consideration of the divergences between the different toises used by geodesists that led the European Arc Measurement (German: Europäische Gradmessung ) to consider, at the meeting of its Permanent Commission in Neuchâtel in 1866, the founding of a World Institute for the Comparison of Geodetic Standards, the first step towards the creation of the BIPM.

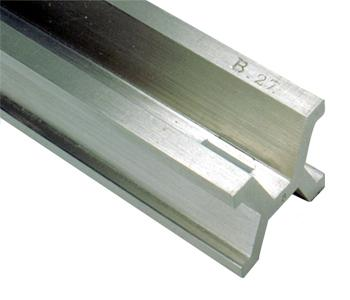
Closeup of National Prototype Metre Bar No. 27, made in 1889 by the International Bureau of Weights and Measures (BIPM) in collaboration with Johnson Matthey and given to the United States, which served as the standard for American cartography from 1890 replacing the Committee Meter, an authentic copy of the Mètre des Archives produced in 1799 in Paris, which Ferdinand Rudolph Hassler had brought to the United States in 1805.

Careful comparisons with several standard toises showed that the international metre calibrated on the Mètre des Archives was not exactly equal to the legal metre or 443.296 lines of the toise, but, in round numbers, 1/(75 000) of the length smaller, or approximately 0.013 millimetres. By contrast, in 2007, a comparison of the American Committee meter and its Swiss counterpart was carried out at NIST and METAS. The two metre standards can be considered perfectly equivalent, with a difference of only (0.96 ±3.0) micrometres. The poor quality of the measuring surfaces explained the significant uncertainty in the measurements compared to today's standards. Assuming a linear thermal expansion coefficient of 11.6·10^{−6} °C^{-1} for steel, the difference between the legal metre (defined as 443.296 lines of the Toise of Peru) and the international metre (defined as the length of the Mètre des Archives) must be related to a temperature error of approximately 1.3 °C during the manufacturing of Borda apparatus, which was used for baseline measurements of the Arc measurement of Delambre and Méchain. In his 2002 book The measure of all things, Ken Alder recalled that the legal metre is about 0.2 millimetres shorter than it should be according to its original proposed definition. However, the error in measuring the length of Paris meridian represented less than 2% of the total error, and the error due to a flawed assumption about the shape of the Earth contributed to approximately 3% of the total error. If the meticulous work of Pierre Méchain and Jean Baptiste Delambre were the only source of error, the current metre would be too long by less than 4 μm instead of being too short by 197 μm. The 95% of the missing length of the legal metre is due to the failure to account for vertical deflections; this was beyond the scope of Delambre and Méchain because the Earth's gravitational field had not yet been studied.

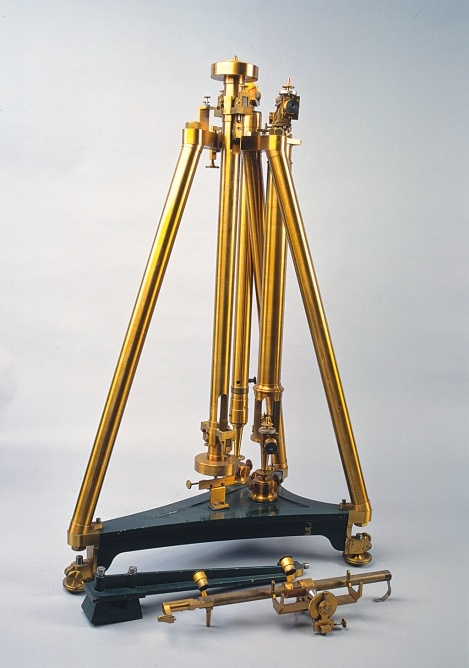
Gravimeter with variant of Repsold-Bessel pendulum.

As the figure of the Earth could be inferred from variations of gravitational field, the United States Coast Survey's direction instructed Charles Sanders Peirce in the spring of 1875 to proceed to Europe for the purpose of making pendulum experiments to chief initial stations for operations of this sort, to bring the determinations of gravitational acceleration in America into communication with those of other parts of the world; and also for the purpose of making a careful study of the methods of pursuing these researches in the different countries of Europe. The progresses of metrology combined with those of gravimetry through gravimeters with variant of Repsold-Bessel pendulum led to a new era of geodesy. If precision metrology had needed the help of geodesy, it could not continue to prosper without the help of metrology. It was then necessary to define a single unit to express all the measurements of terrestrial arcs, and all determinations of the gravitational acceleration by the means of pendulum. Metrology had to create a common unit. The 1875 Conference of the International Association of Geodesy also dealt with the best instrument to be used for the determination of gravitational acceleration. After an in-depth discussion in which Charles Sanders Peirce took part, the association decided in favour of the reversion pendulum, which was used in Switzerland, and it was resolved to redo in Berlin, in the station where Friedrich Wilhelm Bessel made his famous measurements, the determination of gravity by means of devices of various kinds employed in different countries, to compare them and thus to have the equation of their scales. In 1901, Friedrich Robert Helmert found, mainly by gravimetry, parameters of the ellipsoid remarkably close to reality. Although marked by the concern to correct vertical deflections, taking into account the contributions of gravimetry, research between 1910 and 1950 remained practically limited to large continental triangulations. The most significant work would be that by John Fillmore Hayford, which relied mainly on the North American national network. His ellipsoid was adopted in 1924 by the International Union of Geodesy and Geophysics.

=== The 1889 General Conference on Weights and Measures ===
In 1889, the General Conference on Weights and Measures, presided by Alfred Descloizeaux, met at the Pavillon de Breteuil, the seat of the International Bureau of Weights and Measures. It performed the first great deed dictated by the motto inscribed in the pediment of the splendid edifice that is the metric system: "A tous les temps, à tous les peuples" (For all times, to all peoples); and this deed consisted in the approval and distribution, among the governments of the states supporting the Metre Convention, of prototype standards of hitherto unknown precision intended to propagate the metric unit throughout the whole world.

For metrology the matter of expansibility was fundamental; as a matter of fact, the temperature measuring error related to the length measurement in proportion to the expansibility of the standard and the constantly renewed efforts of metrologists to protect their measuring instruments against the interfering influence of temperature revealed clearly the importance they attached to the expansion-induced errors. It was common knowledge, for instance, that effective measurements were possible only inside a building, the rooms of which were well protected against the changes in outside temperature, and the very presence of the observer created an interference against which it was often necessary to take strict precautions. Thus, the Contracting States also received a collection of thermometers whose accuracy made it possible to ensure that of length measurements. The international prototype metre would also be a "line standard"; that is, the metre was defined as the distance between two lines marked on the bar, so avoiding the wear problems of end standards.

The foundation of the United States Coast and Geodetic Survey by Ferdinand Rudolph Hassler paved the way to the actual definition of the metre, with Charles Sanders Peirce being the first to experimentally link the metre to the wavelength of a spectral line. Albert Abraham Michelson soon took up the idea and improved it. On the other hand, the comparison of the new prototypes of the metre with each other involved the development of special measuring equipment and the definition of a reproducible temperature scale. The BIPM's thermometry work led to the discovery of special alloys of iron–nickel, in particular invar, whose practically negligible coefficient of expansion made it possible to develop simpler baseline measurement methods, and for which its director, the Swiss physicist Charles-Edouard Guillaume, was granted the Nobel Prize in Physics in 1920. Guillaume's Nobel Prize marked the end of an era in which metrology was leaving the field of geodesy to become an autonomous scientific discipline able of redefining the metre through technological applications of physics. In 1906, before the opening of the Simplon Tunnel, Swiss surveyors measured the distance between the stations of Iselle di Trasquera and Brig, Switzerland using invar wire instruments. This method was subsequently used in the construction of large particle accelerators.

=== Additional roles for standardised time ===
In 1987 the International Bureau of Weights and Measures took over some of the work of the International Time Bureau when it was dissolved in 1987. The remaining tasks were assigned to the International Earth Rotation and Reference Systems Service (IERS), which replaced the International Polar Motion Service and the earth-rotation section of the International Time Bureau. Already in 1936, irregularities in the speed of Earth's rotation due to the unpredictable movement of air and water masses were discovered through the use of quartz clocks. They implied that the Earth's rotation was an imprecise way of determining time. In 1967, the second was redefined based on atomic clocks, resulting in the International Atomic Time (TAI). The International Bureau of Weights and Measures began to establish atomic clocks world-wide, numbering more than 450 currently. In October 2026, The International Bureau Of Weights And Measures adopted resolution 5 to end leap-second adjustments to Coordinated Universal Time (UTC) from 20 May 2027, allowing the difference between UTC and Universal Time (UT1) to reach 3,600 seconds before adding in an extra hour, which will not happen for an estimated 3,000 years.

=== The 2019 revision of the SI ===
The International System of Units (SI, abbreviated from the French Système international (d'unités)), the modern form of the metric system was revised in 2019. It is the only system of measurement with an official status in nearly every country in the world. It comprises a coherent system of units of measurement starting with seven base units, which are the second (the unit of time with the symbol s), metre (length, m), kilogram (mass, kg), ampere (electric current, A), kelvin (thermodynamic temperature, K), mole (amount of substance, mol), and candela (luminous intensity, cd). Since 2019, the magnitudes of all SI units have been defined by declaring exact numerical values for seven defining constants when expressed in terms of their SI units. These defining constants are the hyperfine transition frequency of caesium Δν_{Cs}, the speed of light in vacuum c, the Planck constant h, the elementary charge e, the Boltzmann constant k, the Avogadro constant N_{A}, and the luminous efficacy K_{cd}.

== Directors ==
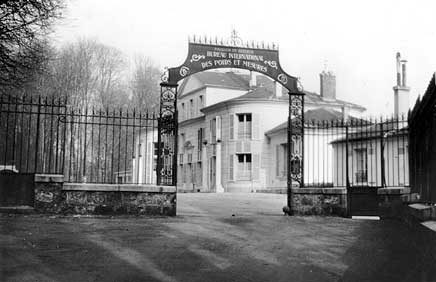
Pavillon de Breteuil in Saint-Cloud, France

Since its establishment, the directors of the BIPM have been:

Name	Country	Mandate	Notes
Gilberto Govi	Italy	1875–1877	
Johannes Pernet	Switzerland	1877–1879	Interim Director
Ole Jacob Broch	Norway	1879–1889	
J.-René Benoît	France	1889–1915	Honorary Director
Charles Édouard Guillaume	Switzerland	1915–1936	Honorary Director
Albert Pérard	France	1936–1951	Honorary Director
Charles Volet	Switzerland	1951–1961	Honorary Director
Jean Terrien	France	1962–1977	Honorary Director
Pierre Giacomo	France	1978–1988	Honorary Director
Terry J. Quinn	United Kingdom	1988–2003	Emeritus Director
Andrew J. Wallard	United Kingdom	2004–2010	Emeritus Director
Michael Kühne	Germany	2011–2012	
Martin J.T. Milton	United Kingdom	2013–2025	Emeritus Director
Annette Koo	New Zealand	2026–	

== See also ==
- List of technical standard organizations
- Foundation of the International Bureau of Weights and Measures
- History of the metre
- International Organization for Standardization
- Institute for Reference Materials and Measurements
- Metrologia
- Seconds pendulum
- Swiss Geodetic Commission
- World Metrology Day
- Versailles project on advanced materials and standards
