= Platinum–iridium alloy =

Alloys of the precious metals platinum and iridium

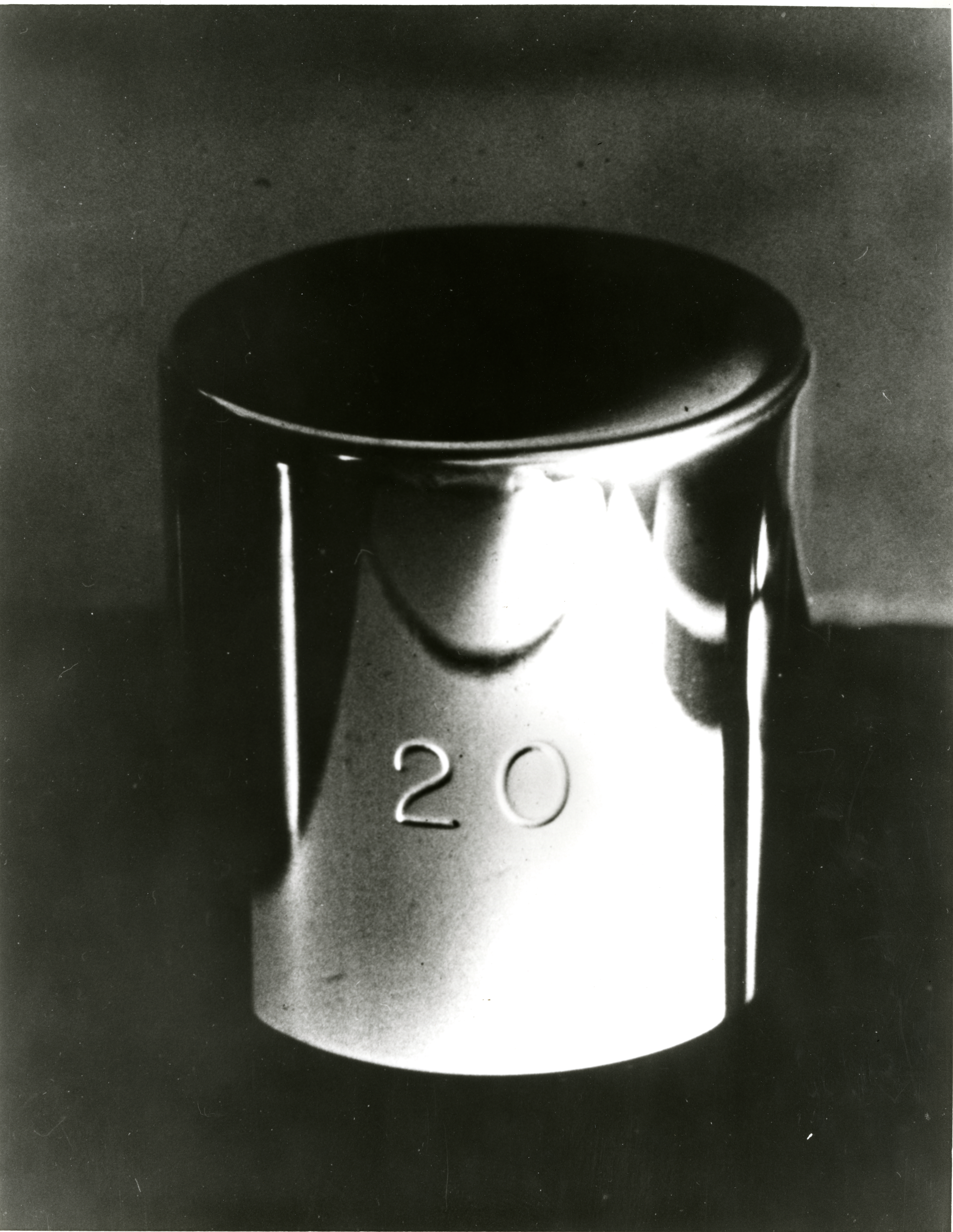
Platinum-iridium National Prototype of the Kilogram, copy #20 of the 40 distributed in 1889 after the Treaty of the Metre.

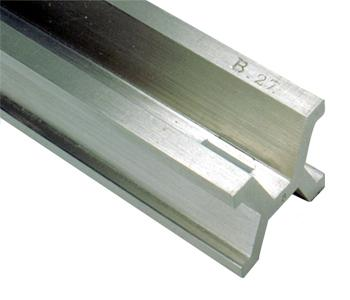
After the Treaty of the Meter had been signed in 1875, the International Bureau of Weights and Measures made 30 prototype meter standards of platinum-iridium.

Platinum–iridium alloys are alloys of the platinum group precious metals platinum and iridium.

Typical alloy proportions are 90:10 or 70:30 (Pt:Ir). These have the chemical stability of platinum, but increased hardness. The Vickers hardness of pure platinum is 56 HV while platinum with 50% of iridium can reach over 500 HV. This improved hardness has also been considered as beneficial for use in platinum jewellery, particularly watch cases.

Owing to their high cost, these alloys are rarely used. They have been used for spinnerets in the manufacture of synthetic fibres.

Their well-known use is in metrology, where they were used to make the international prototypes used by international standards bodies for mass standards such as the International Prototype of the Kilogram and the International Prototype Metre, although both have been superseded during the 2019 revision of the SI.

The other extremely widespread use for Pt/Ir alloy is fabrication of metal microelectrodes for electrical stimulation of nervous tissue and electrophysiological recordings. Pt/Ir alloy has an optimal combination of mechanical and electrochemical properties for this application. Pure iridium is very difficult to pull into small diameter wires; at the same time, platinum has a low yield strength, which makes pure platinum wires bend too easily during insertion into nervous tissue. Additionally, platinum–iridium alloys containing oxides of both metals can be electro-deposited onto the surface of microelectrodes.
