= International Commission on Clouds =

Specialized agency of the International Meteorological Organization

- Established: March 30, 1913; 113 years ago
- Founded at: Austria
- Type: International organization
- Purpose: Research on clouds
- Parent organization: International Meteorological Organization
- Staff: H. Hildebrandsson (Sweden); Shaw (United Kingdom); E. Durand-Gréville (France)

The International Commission on Clouds was a specialized international agency of the International Meteorological Organization (IMO), founded during the International Conference of Directors of Meteorological Observatories in March 1913. During the conference, M. E. Durand-Gréville, a French meteorologist, published and presented research about squall lines and tornadoes. The research presented by Durand-Gréville regarded how tornadoes can form in any "squall-zones" of squall lines, which can be detected through barometers. This led to the creation of the "law of squalls" as well as the creation of the International Commission on Clouds.

The commission was chaired by MM. H. Hildebrandsson, a meteorologist and professor in Sweden, Shaw of the United Kingdom, and E. Durand-Gréville of France.
