= Johannes Pernet =

Swiss physicist and metrologist (1845–1902)

- Born: 18 December 1845; Bern, Switzerland
- Died: 15 February 1902 (aged 56); Zürich, Switzerland
- Education: University of Breslau
- Scientific career
- Workplaces: International Bureau of Weights and Measures; ETH Zürich

Johannes Pernet (18 December 1845 – 15 February 1902), also known as Johann or Jean Pernet, was a Swiss physicist and metrologist who worked mainly on temperature measurement.

Pernet was born in Bern to Jean Samuel Pernet, a native of Ormont-Dessus (Vaud) who was a teacher in Bern, and Catharina Lucia Pernet (née Seewer). In late 1864, he began studying mathematics, physics and meteorology at the University of Bern under Heinrich von Wild. His father had died in 1855, so from his first terms he had to earn extra money by teaching at schools in Bern. In 1866, he became Wild's assistant, which led to his first research paper, Der tägliche Gang der meteorologischen Elemente in Bern ("The daily variation of meteorological elements in Bern"), published in 1869.

In 1868 he went to Königsberg to study with Franz Ernst Neumann and from 1869 to 1872 Pernet worked for Wild in St. Petersburg at the Central Physical Observatory - Russia's premier meteorological center of the time.

Pernet moved to Breslau in 1874 to serve as academic assistant to Oskar Emil Meyer (brother of Lothar Meyer). Under Meyer's direction he obtained his Dr. phil from the University of Breslau in 1875 ('Beiträge zur Thermometrie').

After a brief appointment in Berlin at the Bureau of Weights and Measures, where he continued his thermometric investigations, Pernet was hired to work for the International Bureau of Weights and Measures (Paris) in 1877. In 1877, Pernet married Pauline Häusler from Breslau (daughter of Ernst Gottlieb). In Paris, Pernet contributed to the establishment of the Bureau and was appointed acting (interim) director after the departure of its first director, Gilberto Govi. Despite the recognition of his scientific achievements, his hope of being promoted did not come to fruition, and at the end of 1885, after 8½ years of tireless work, Pernet moved back to Berlin with his wife and three children, where he once again found employment with the Standard Calibration Commission.

In 1887, Pernet became a member of the German Physical Society (Deutsche Physikalische Gesellschaft).

Starting from 1887, Pernet joined Hermann von Helmholtz in the newly established Physikalisch-Technischen Reichsanstalt in Berlin-Charlottenburg where he was set to assume prominent position thanks to the support of Helmholtz. Just as the construction of the administrative building serving his department was nearly complete, and regular work was about to begin, the Swiss Polytechnic in Zurich lost its professor of experimental physics, Dr. Heinrich Schneebeli and Pernet succeeded him in 1890 upon receiving an appointment to this chair.

Pernet taught physics at the Swiss Polytechnic (now Federal Institute of Technology in Zurich) from 1890 to 1902. There, Albert Einstein was among his pupils and Pernet famously reprimanded Einstein for his poor work ethic.

When, at the end of 1895, Wilhelm Röntgen published his discovery of the x-rays, Pernet studied them with great energy. Pernet became one of the earliest physics professors to actively demonstrate and lecture on the phenomenon.
