= Timeline of International Kilogram Prototypes =

Physical artifacts that formerly realized and disseminated the kilogram

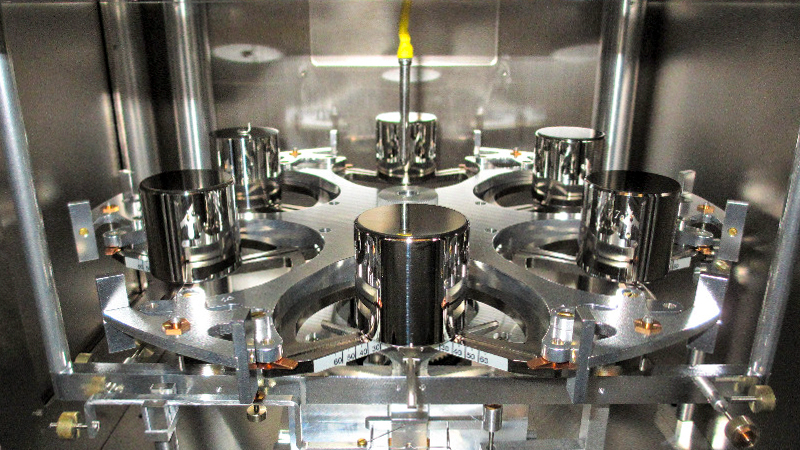
The BIPM mass comparator with prototype kilograms in place

Official copies of the International Prototype of the Kilogram (IPK), the 1 kg platinum–iridium alloy right circular cylinders, disseminated the kilogram from 1889 until the redefinition based on physical constants in 2019. These prototypes underpinned global trust in scientific discovery, industrial manufacturing, and international trade for over a century.

Under the Metre Convention's framework for international collaboration in metrology, the pure platinum "Kilogram of the Archives" standard from 1799 was replaced by the platinum–iridium International Prototype of the Kilogram (IPK) in 1879. Pure platinum was too soft for a durable mass standard, but the addition of just 10% iridium in the alloy greatly increased hardness while still retaining extreme resistance to oxidation, extremely high density, and low magnetic susceptibility. The harder alloy reduced wear and allowed the prototypes to be finished to a high polish, minimising variability.

The IPK and six sister copies are stored under secure environmental controls at the International Bureau of Weights and Measures (BIPM) in the Pavillon de Breteuil. (Note: The Pavillon's (and hence the BIPM's) postal address is in the neighbouring commune of Sèvres, but the grounds are in Saint-Cloud.) Other copies, manufactured primarily by Johnson Matthey beginning in 1879, were distributed to national metrology institutes of countries that had ratified and conformed to the Treaty of the Metre (and to certain non‑national organisations). Each copy carries a unique identification number and served as a primary mass standard, providing traceability of local measurements to the IPK through periodic comparisons.

The timeline shows the year of assignment and the year of last known calibration. The entries fall into three broad groups:

- Copies 0–40 — Foundational prototypes and early national standards: the IPK itself, its six BIPM sister copies, and the first wave of official allocations to original signatories after the 1st CGPM, with detailed custody and calibration histories.
- Copies 44–63 — Mid‑period issues and expanding membership: mid‑career Johnson Matthey productions allocated to new member states, as well as replacement or supplementary prototypes.
- Copies 75–special designations — Late‑period and special‑purpose prototypes: later allocations, non‑sequential or experimental artefacts, and prototypes intended for particular scientific or commemorative purposes, each with its own custodial context.

== List of official copies of the International Prototype of the Kilogram (IPK) ==
#	Allocation: Country (year)	Last known location (institution, city)	Last known status	Last known Calibration	Drift (μg/yr)	Notes
𝕶	BIPM (1883)	BIPM vault, Saint-Cloud, France	International Prototype Kilogram (IPK) "Le Grand K (𝕶)"	2014	−0.50	Drift ≈ −0.50 μg/yr over ~100 yr relative to official copies; ~+50 μg total divergence; stored under triple bell jars.
KI	BIPM (1889)	BIPM vault, Saint‑Cloud, France	Check standard	2014		First of three nearly identical cylinders of Pt10Ir alloy fabricated in 1879.
KII		Paris Observatory, Paris		1880		Compared to Kilogram of the Archives w/KI & KIII (later 𝕶) by four observers in 1880 at the Paris Observatory.
1	France (1889)	BIPM vault, Saint‑Cloud, France	Retired check standard1889-1925 ("sister" copy).	1988-92		Retired in 1925 after falling. Replaced as an official copy by No. 7.
2	Romania (1889)	National repository, Romania	National prototype	2023 No. 165		
3	Spain (1889)	National repository, Spain	National prototype	2013 No. 48		
4	United States (1889)	NIST, United States	National prototype	2013 No. 47	−0.37	1889: -75 μg; 1989: -106 μg; ~1999: -116 μg. Net change −41 μg over ~110 yr.
5	Italy (1889)	National repository, Italy	National prototype	1988-92		
6	Japan (1889)	National Metrology Institute, Japan	National prototype	1988-92		
7	France	BIPM vault, Saint‑Cloud, France	Official copy since 1925 ("sister" copy)	1988-92		
8	France	BIPM vault, Saint‑Cloud, France	Official copy since 1905 (serial 8(41))	1988-92		Sister copy of IPK #8 mis‑stamped as 41 (Note: Prototype No. 8(41) was accidentally stamped with the number 41, but its accessories carry the proper number 8. Since there is no prototype marked 8, this prototype is referred to as 8(41).)
9	BIPM (1889)	BIPM calibration laboratory, Saint‑Cloud, France	Working copy 2014	2014		Fell in Bunge balance 1949. Used for BIPM 1963–64 verification.
10	Portugal (1889)	IPQ, Caparica	National prototype	2022 No. 110		
11	Serbia (1889)	National repository, Serbia	National prototype retired.			Damaged 1907; 1925 replaced by No. 29.
12	Russia (1889)	VNIIM, Saint Petersburg, Russia	National prototype	2014 No. 24		
13	France (1889)					
14	Austria (1889)	BEV	National prototype	2019 No. 46		
15	Bavaria (1889)			1954		
16	Hungary (1889)	National repository, Hungary	National prototype	2018 No. 39		
17	France (1889)	LNE-CETIAT	National prototype	2015 No. 18		
18	United Kingdom (1889)	National Physical Laboratory, United Kingdom	National prototype	2024 No. 11		
19	Italy (1889)			1954		
20	United States (1889)	NIST, United States	National prototype	2019 No. 44	0.00	1889: -39 μg; 1948: -19 μg; 1989: -39 μg (no net drift over ~100 yr).
21	Mexico	National repository, Mexico	National prototype	2021 No. 107		
22	Germany (1889)			1903		Damaged in Berlin in 1944
23	Finland	National repository, Finland	National prototype	2022 No. 108		
24	Spain (1889)	National repository, Spain	National prototype	2015 No. 121		
25	Paris Observatory (1889)	BIPM calibration laboratory, Saint‑Cloud	Working copy (special use)	2014		Re‑assigned 1958, to the BIPM in nearly unused condition.
26	Saint Petersburg Academy of Sci. (1889)	VNIIM, Saint Petersburg, Russia	Official copy			
27	Denmark (1889)					Retired 1946; 1949 replaced by No. 48,
28	Belgium (1889)	National repository, Belgium	National prototype	2021 No. 16		
29	Conservatoire national des arts et métiers	National repository, Serbia	National prototype			1925 transferred from Conservatoire national des arts et métiers to Kingdom of Yugoslavia to replace No. 11.
30	Argentina	National repository, Argentina	National prototype	2019 No. 6		
31	BIPM (1889)	BIPM calibration laboratory, Saint‑Cloud, France	Working copy	2014		Fell in Bunge balance 1951. Used for BIPM 1963–64 verification
32	France	BIPM vault, Saint‑Cloud, France	Official copy since 1905 ("sister" copy)	2014	0.00	BIPM cleaning trials (2014) on Nos. 7 and 32 showed < 0.5 μg mass loss on a third full cleaning; high short‑term stability.
33	Austria (1889)					
34	France (1889)	French Academy of Sciences, Paris, France	Held by non‑national organisation	2015 No. 67		
35	France (1889)	National repository, France	National prototype	2015 No. 74		
36	Norway (1889)	National repository, Norway	National prototype	2024 No. 104		
37	Belgium (1889)	National repository, Belgium	National prototype	2022 No. 112		
38	Switzerland (1889)	National repository, Switzerland	National prototype	2015 No. 20		
39	Japan	National repository, South Korea	National prototype	1988-92	−6.47	−665 μg by the 3rd PV with poor surface condition. Ceded to the Republic of Korea in 1958.
40	Sweden (1889)	RISE, Borås	National prototype	1991 No. 22	-0.02	1889: -0.037; 1948: -0.039, 1991: -0.035(2) mg
41	Czechoslovakia(1929)	Slovak Republic		1954		Shown in 1st PV unassigned, 2nd PV assigned to CS, but not in 3rd. No 8(41) appears separately.
42′	France	BIPM, Saint‑Cloud, France	Underweight "standard" (working copy) (Note: Nos. 42′, 77 and 650 are called "standards" rather than "prototypes" because they are slightly underweight, slightly too much material having been removed when they were manufactured. Other than being more than 1 mg below the nominal 1 kg mass, they are identical to the prototypes, and are used during routine calibration work.)	2014		Allocated to Turkey in 1935; 1953 exchanged for No 54.
43	France	BIPM, Saint‑Cloud, France	Official copy since 1939 ("sister" copy)	1988-92		Used for BIPM 1963–64 verification
44	Australia (1947)	NMI, Australia	National prototype	2015 No. 70		Returned for BIPM 1963–64 verification on request
45	Argentina (1939)					Not returned for BIPM 1963–64 verification on request Lost 1986.
46	Dutch East Indies (1939)	SNSU‑BSN, Indonesia	National prototype	2015 No. 82		Returned for BIPM 1963–64 verification on request
47	France	BIPM, Saint‑Cloud, France	Official copy since 1939 ("sister" copy)	2014		Used for BIPM 1963–64 verification
48	Denmark (1949)	DFM, Denmark	National prototype	2021 No. 106	+0.78	Delivered in 1949 at +81 μg; certified +112 μg in the 1988–1992 periodic verification (+31 μg over ~40 yr).
49	Austria	BEV, Austria	National prototype	2019 No. 46		Returned for BIPM 1963–64 verification on request
50	Canada	NRC, Canada	National prototype	1988-92		Returned for BIPM 1963–64 verification on request
51	Poland	GUM, Poland	National prototype	2021 No. 4		
52	Germany	PTB, Germany	National prototype	2010 No. 21		
53	Netherlands	VSL, Netherlands	National prototype	2024 No. 12		1889: Kingdom of the Netherlands had ratified but didn't adhere to the Meter Treaty and was not entitled to an original prototype.
54	Turkey (1953)	UME, Turkey	National prototype	2017 No. 48		Exchanged to replace No 42.
55	Germany (1954)	PTB, Germany	National prototype	2023 No. 80	+1.26	~126 μg/century relative to the IPK since 1954; cited as a high‑drift case.
56	South Africa (1955)	NMISA, South Africa	National prototype	2015 No. 77		
57	India (1958)	NPLI, New Delhi	National prototype	2022 No. 109		Excluded from 3rd PV cleaning mass change calculations.
58	United Arab Republic (1963)	NIS, Egypt	National prototype	2022 No. 115		Used for BIPM 1963–64 verification
59	n/a	National Research Laboratory of Metrology (Japan)	Standard E59			Mistakenly listed as platinum-iridium prototype; NUM number E59.
60	China (1963)	NIM, China	National prototype	2023 No. 164		
61	China (1963)					Retired 1978; replaced by No. 64.
62	Istituto di Metrologia G. Colonnetti (1964)	INRiM, Turin	Held by non‑national organisation	1988-92		
63	France	BIPM, Saint‑Cloud, France	Working copy	2014	0.00	~2 μg stability across repeated cleanings using the NBS‑2 balance.
64	China	NIM, China	National prototype	2024 No. 103		
65	Slovakia	SMU, Slovakia	National prototype	2019 No. 47		
66	Brazil	INMETRO, Brazil	National prototype	2019 No. 3		
67	Czech Republic	CMI, Czech Republic	National prototype	2021 No. 2		
68	Chile	CENAMET, Chile	National prototype	1988-92		
69	Portugal	Portuguese Institute for Quality, Portugal	National prototype	2022 No. 111		
70	Germany	PTB, Germany	National prototype	2013 No. 70		
71	Israel (1992)	INMI, Israel	National prototype	2015 No. 83		Newly machined, finished and adjusted @BIPM w/diamond tool.
72	South Korea (1992)	KRISS, South Korea	National prototype	2017 No. 45		Newly machined, finished and adjusted @BIPM w/diamond tool.
73	BIPM (1988)	BIPM, Saint‑Cloud, France	Special‑use working copy	2014		
74	Canada (1992)	NRC, Canada	National prototype	2015 No. 23		Newly machined, finished and adjusted @BIPM w/diamond tool.
75	Hong Kong (1993)	SCL, Hong Kong	National prototype	2017 No. 1		Newly machined, finished and adjusted @BIPM w/diamond tool.
76	Istituto di metrologia G. Colonnetti (1993)	INRiM, Turin	National prototype	2025 No. 126		
77	France (1992)	BIPM, Saint‑Cloud, France	Underweight "standard"	2014		Underweight standard; not included in drift calculations.
78	Taiwan	Center for Measurement Standards (CMS), ITRI, Hsinchu	National prototype	2025 No. 40		
79	United States (1996)	NIST, United States	National prototype	2012 No. 4		
80	Thailand	NIMT, Thailand	National prototype	2023 No. 84		
81	United Kingdom	NPL, United Kingdom	National prototype	2013 No. 47		
82	United Kingdom	NPL, United Kingdom	National prototype	2004 No. 20		
83	Singapore	NMC, Singapore	National prototype	2023 No. 75		
84	South Korea	KRISS, South Korea	National prototype	2003 No. 53		
85	United States	NIST, United States	National prototype	2012 No. 30		Used in 2019-20 CCM key comparison
86	Sweden (2002)	RISE, Borås	National prototype	2004 No. 68		
87	Australia	NMI, Australia	National prototype	2004 No. 77		
88	France	BIPM, Saint‑Cloud, France	Working copy	2014		
89	Switzerland	METAS, Switzerland	National prototype	2015 No. 73		
90	Mexico	CENAM, Mexico	National prototype	2021 No. 108		
91	France	BIPM, Saint‑Cloud, France	Working copy	2014		
92	United States	NIST, United States	National prototype	2016 No. 134		
93	Saudi Arabia	SASO, Riyadh	National prototype	2024 No. 13		
94	Japan	NMIJ, Tsukuba, Japan	National prototype	2015 No. 25		Used in 2019-20 CCM key comparison
95	Kenya	KEBS, Kenya	National prototype	2022 No. 133		
96	Mexico	CENAM, Mexico	National prototype	2021 No. 108		
97						
98						
99						
100						
101						
102	USA	NIST, USA		2014 No. 53		
103						
104	USA	NIST, USA		2014 No. 54		Used in 2019-20 CCM key comparison
105	USA	NIST, USA		2014 No. 55		
106	Canada	NRC, Canada		2015 No. 17		Used in 2019-20 CCM key comparison
107	Pakistan			2017 No. 47		
108	Colombia			2015 No. 127		
109	Germany	PTB, Germany		2015 No. 5		Used in 2019-20 CCM key comparison
110	China	NIM, China		2016 No. 74		Used in 2019-20 CCM key comparison
111	South Korea	KRISS, South Korea		2017 No. 46		Used in 2019-20 CCM key comparison
112	Indonesia	SNSU‑BSN, Indonesia		2019 No. 98		
113						
114	China (2022)	NIM, China		2022 No. 23		
115	China (2022)	NIM, China		2022 No. 36		
650	BIPM		Working copy since 1993	2014		

== Gallery ==
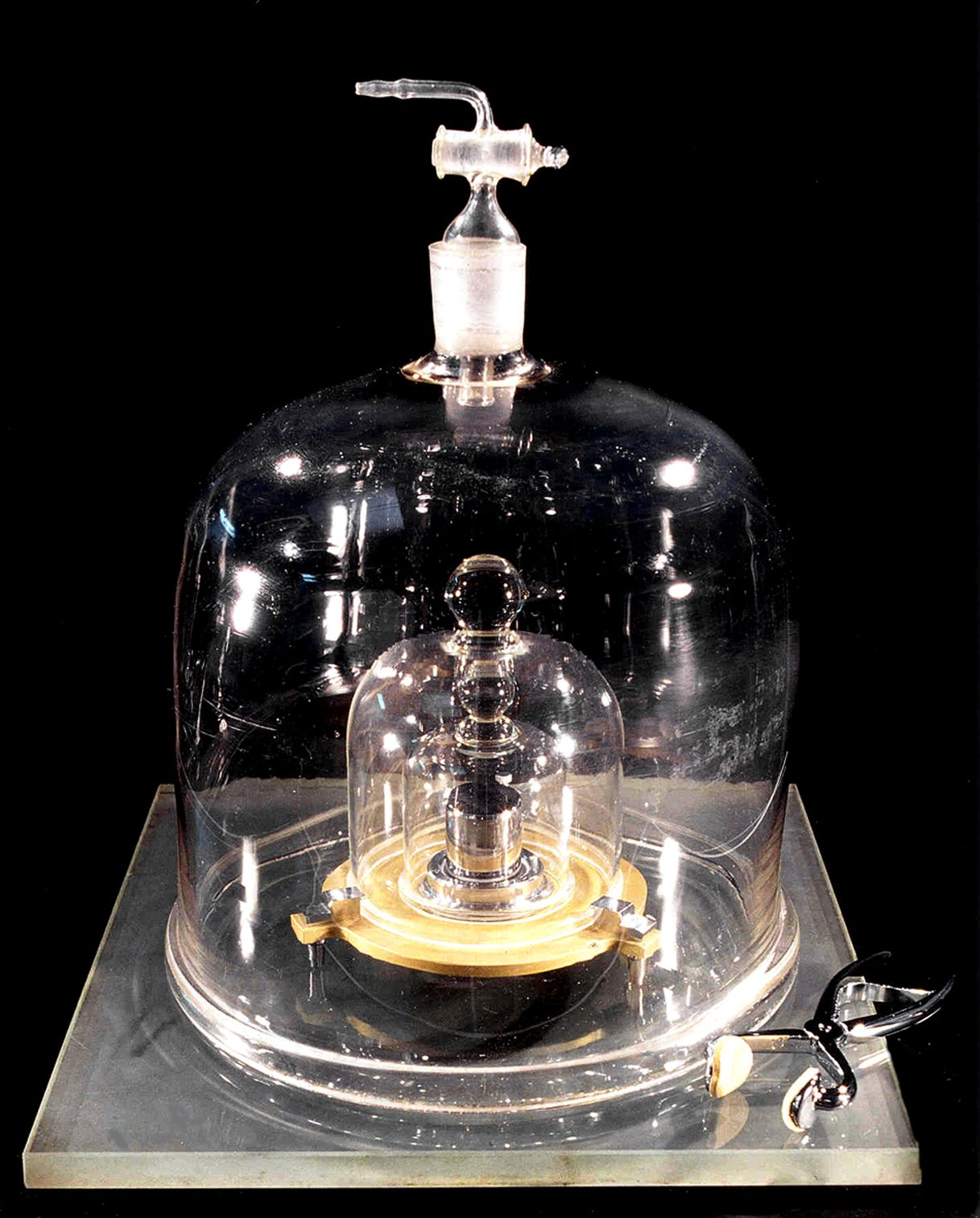
The IPK: Le Grand K

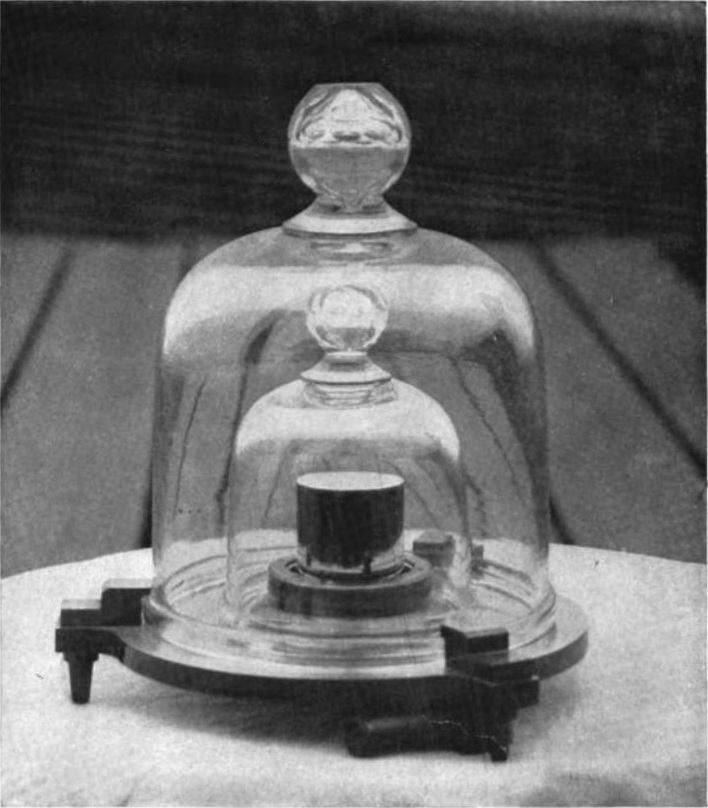
K4

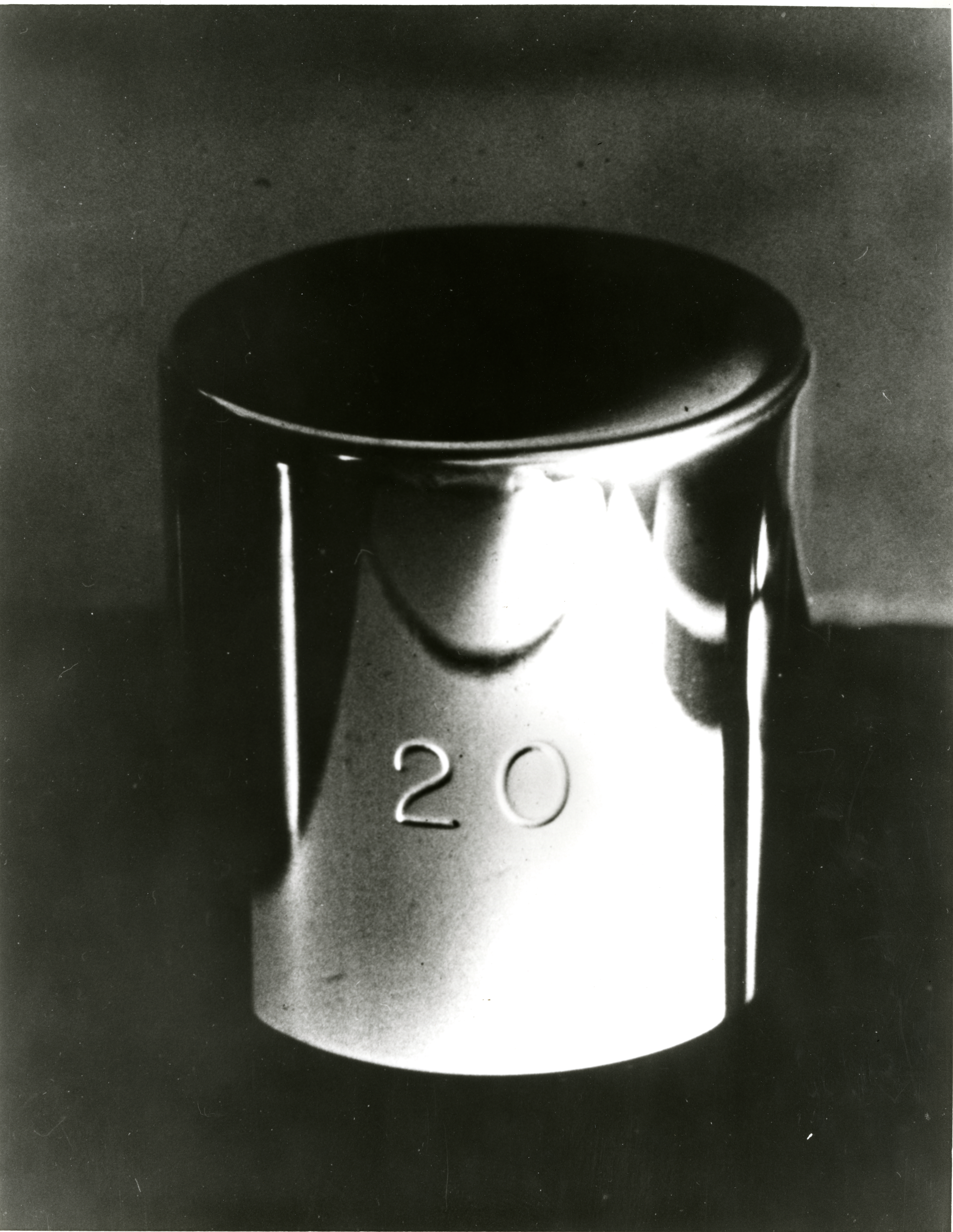
K20

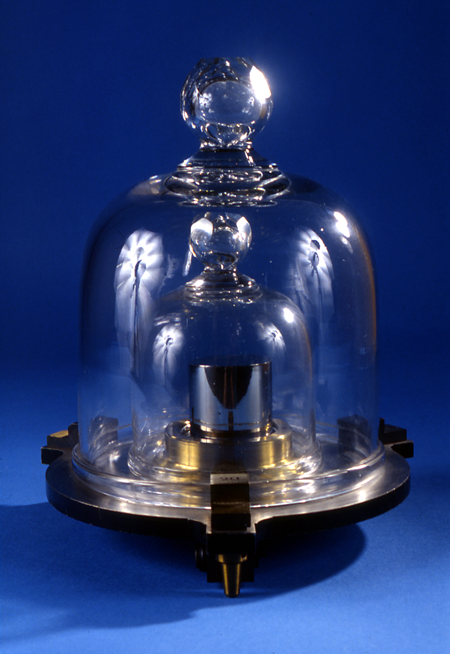
K20

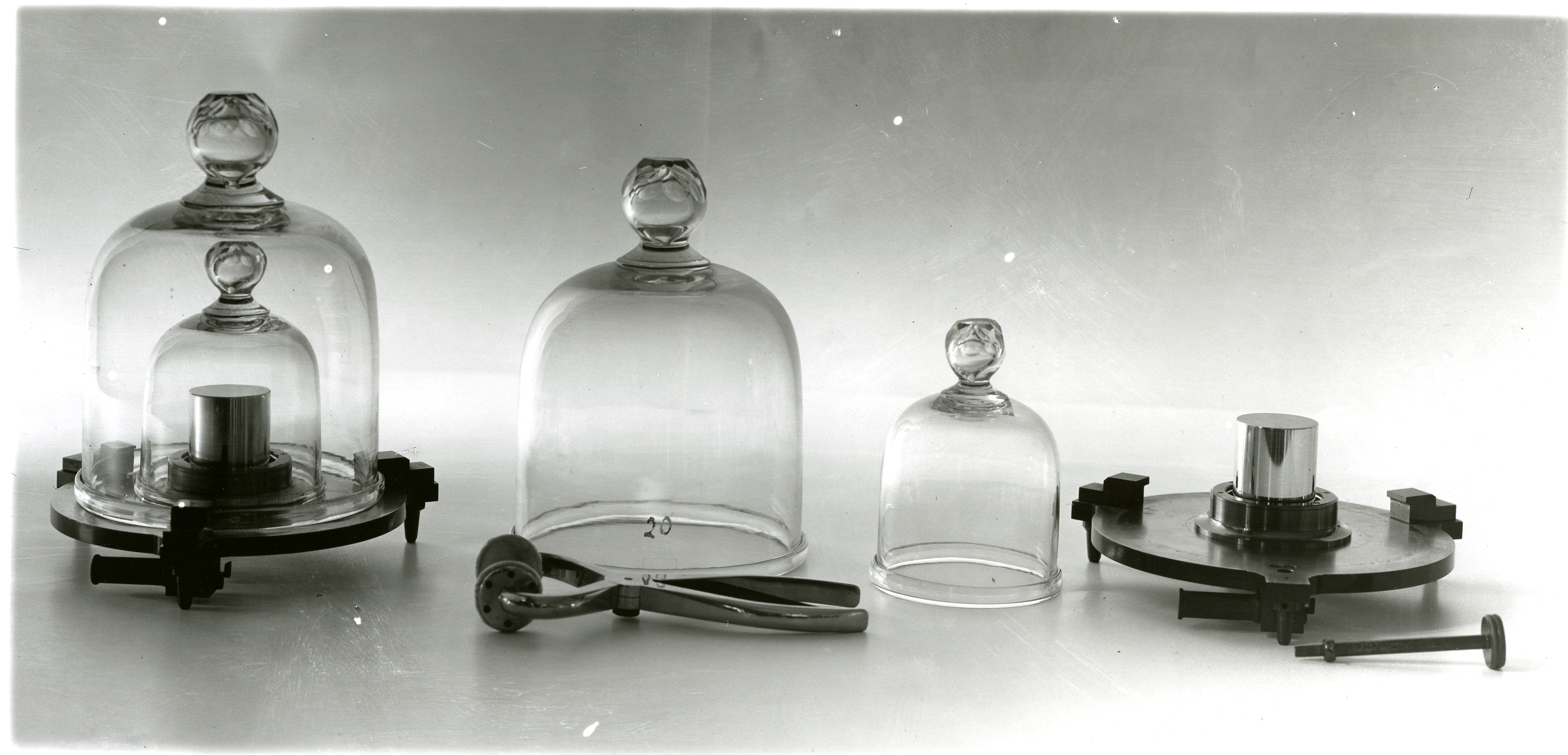
K4 left, K20 right

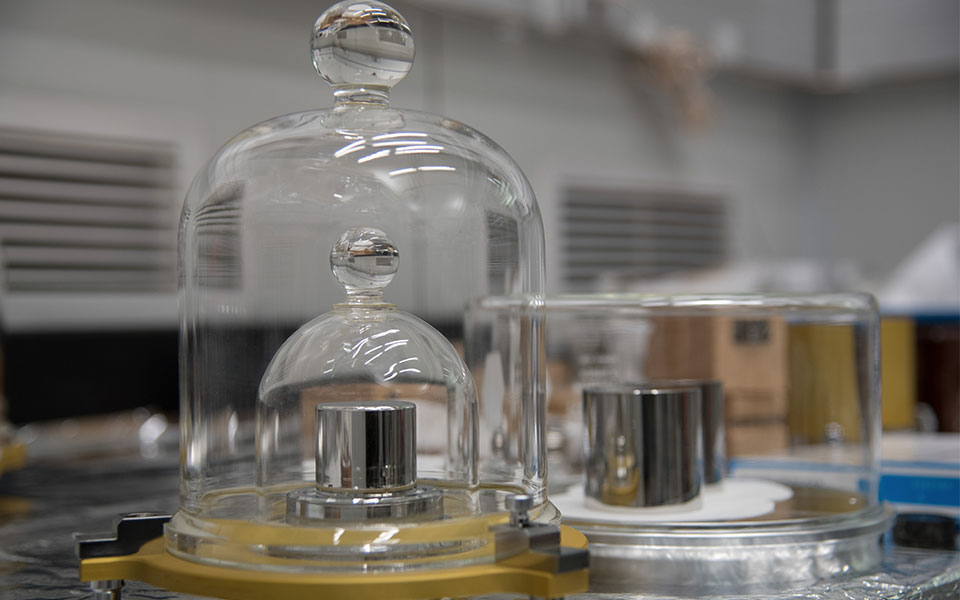
IPK copies at NIST

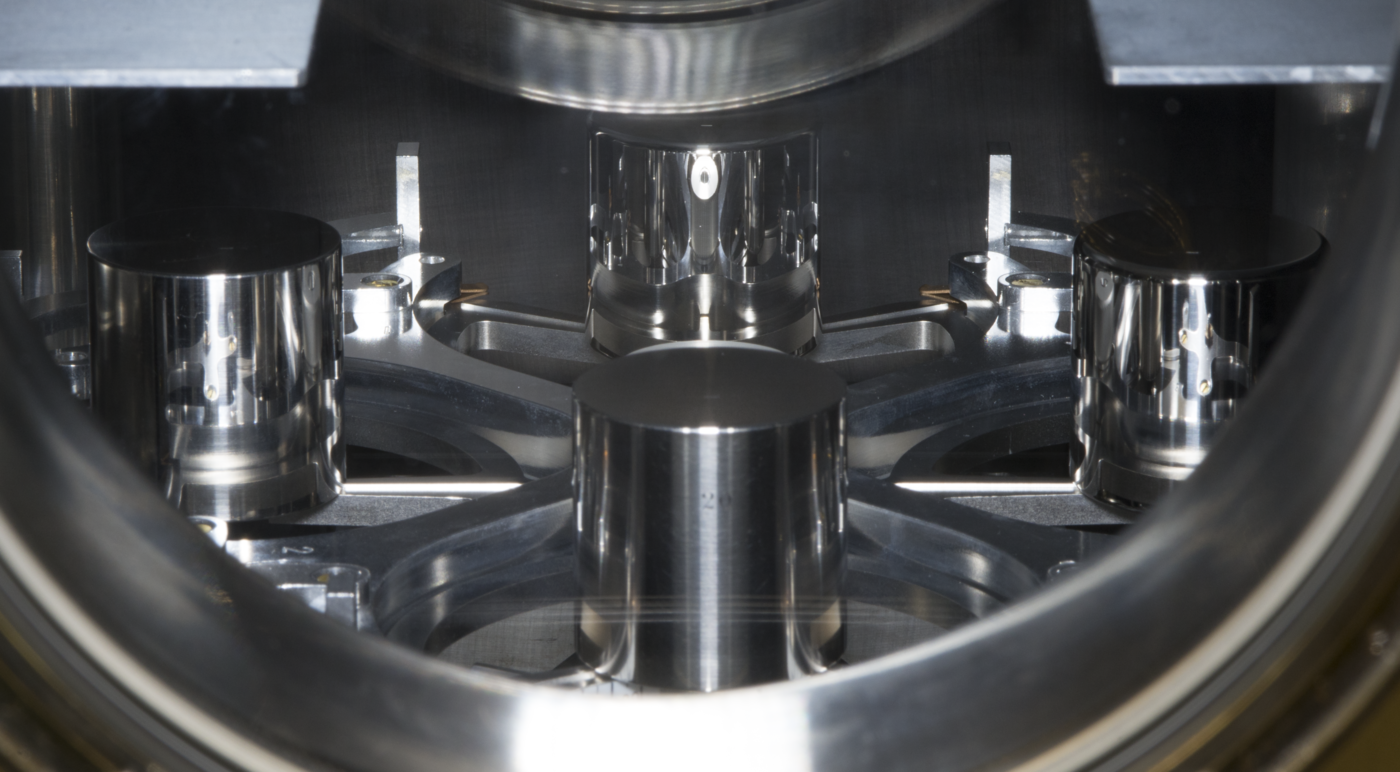
K20 and friends

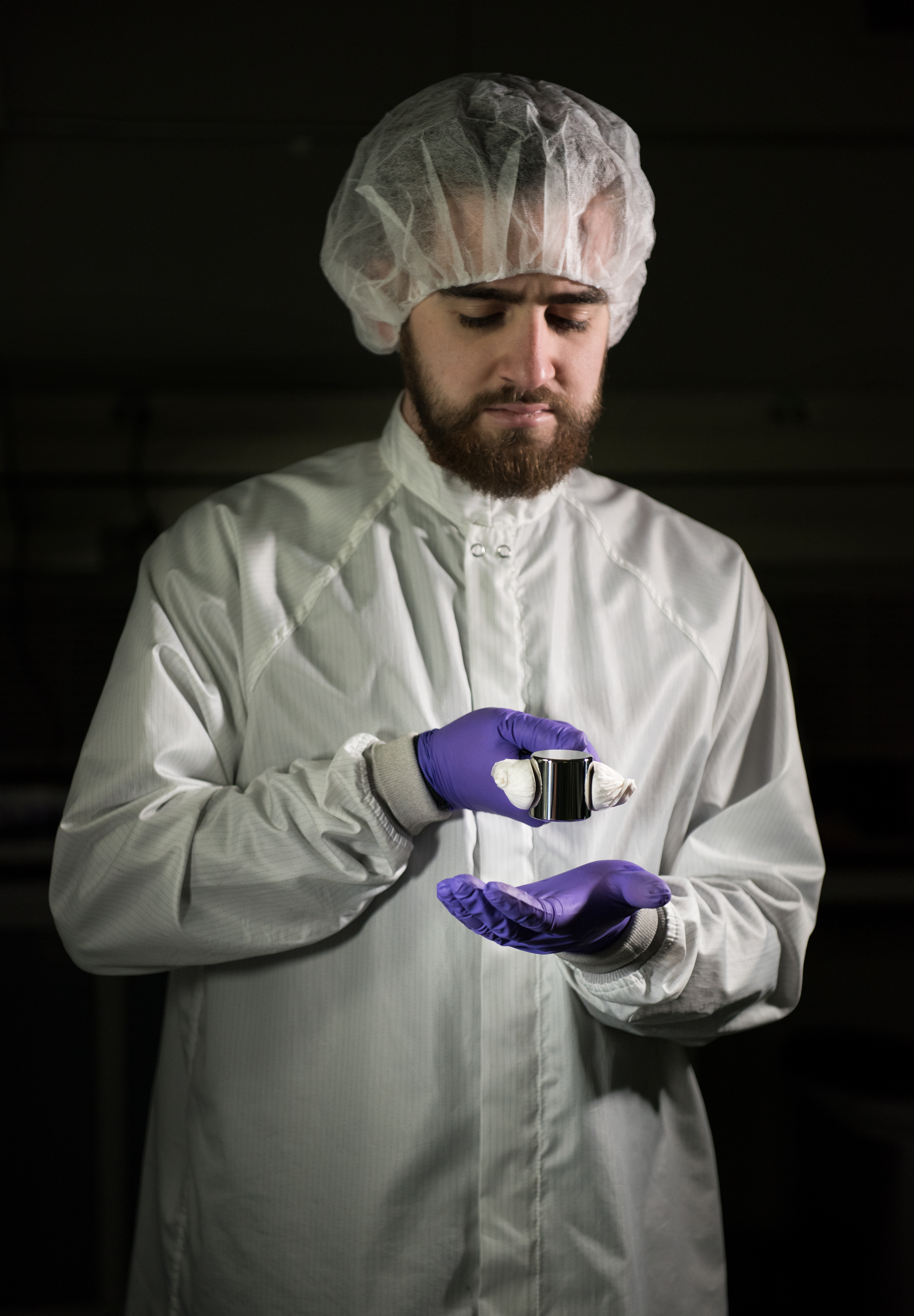
NIST employee Eddie Mulhern holding K92
