= Pernet =

- Pronunciation: French
- Language: Burgundian

Origin
- Region of origin: Burgundy

Pernet is a French surname. Notable people with the surname include:

- André Pernet (1894–1966), French opera singer
- Diane Pernet, French fashion designer
- Étienne Pernet (1824–1899), founder of the Little Sisters of the Assumption Order
- Heinz Pernet, German-born Nazi Party leader
- Jean Pernet, père (1832–1896), French rosarian
- Johannes Pernet (1845-1902), Swiss physicist
- Joseph Pernet-Ducher (1859–1928), French rosarian
