= Annette Koo =

New Zealand physicist and the Director of the Bureau International des Poids et Mesures

- Koo in 2025
- Education: Victoria University of Wellington
- Scientific career
- Fields: Quantum metrology
- Workplaces: Measurement Standards Laboratory (MSL); International Bureau of Weights and Measures
- Doctoral advisor: Joe Trodahl and Tony Bittar

Annette Koo is a New Zealand physicist who is Director of the International Bureau of Weights and Measures.

Koo received a Ph.D. from the Victoria University of Wellington in 2005 for investigations of the optoelectronic properties of gallium nitride films.

After three years in Melbourne as a postdoctoral fellow at the CSIRO and Monash University, Koo returned to New Zealand in 2008 as a research scientist at the Measurement Standards Laboratory of New Zealand, becoming Chief Metrologist in 2021 and its Director in 2022.

Her specialized research focus was on quantum metrology, specifically the measurement of light and how light interacts with materials.

In 2026, Koo became the first woman and the first New Zealander to hold the Director role at the International Bureau of Weights and Measures.
