= Martin Milton =

British physicist

Martin J.T. Milton OBE FInstP
- Milton in 2025
- Born: 1961 (age 64–65); Eastbourne, UK
- Education: University of Oxford (BA 1981); University of Southampton (PhD 1991); London Business School (MBA 1994)
- Awards: Finkelstein Medal (2016); OIML Medal (2025)
- Scientific career
- Fields: Laser physics, metrology
- Workplaces: National Physical Laboratory; International Bureau of Weights and Measures

Martin John Terry Milton (born 1961) is a British physicist who was director of the International Bureau of Weights and Measures (BIPM) from 2013 to 2025.

== Education ==
Milton was born in Eastbourne, East Sussex, and attended Eastbourne Grammar School. He studied physics at Merton College (Oxford University) and received a BA(Hons) in 1981.

== Career ==
In 1981, Milton joined the U.K. National Physical Laboratory Division of Quantum Metrology in Teddington where he worked on building tunable laser-like light sources with applications to atmospheric remote sensing. This work led to a PhD from University of Southampton in 1990 which he completed as an external student.

In 1998, Milton was elevated to NPL Fellow status within the Analytical Science Division and his research mandate broadened to wider issues of atmospheric pollution measurements and methods to ascertain greenhouse gas emission inventories. These efforts led to the developed of methods for high-accuracy measurements of greenhouse gases in the atmosphere which contributed to the global atmospheric models used by the Intergovernmental Panel on Climate Change (IPCC).

After the resignation of BIPM Director Michael Kühne in 2012, Milton was elected as the BIPM Director-designate on 7 June 2012, during the 101st meeting of the International Committee for Weights and Measures (CIPM). Milton oversaw several major transformations of the BIPM. The historic redefinition of the kilogram, ampere, kelvin, and the mole that took place in 2018. Dr. Milton managed the final institutional and scientific preparations required to transition the International System of Units away from physical artifacts.

Milton worked to expand the global reach of the BIPM through international science diplomacy. He spearheaded the initiative on universal adherence to the Metre Convention which was adopted in 2022. For these lasting contributions to international measurement infrastructure and global standardization, he was appointed an Officer of the Order of the British Empire (OBE) in 2025 and was awarded the OIML medal in 2025.
