= Justin-Mirande René Benoit =

French physicist (1844–1922)

Jean-René Benoit
- Born: 28 November 1844; Montpellier, France
- Died: 5 May 1922 (aged 77); Courbevoie, France
- Education: University of Montpellier School of Medicine (1869); École des Hautes Études, Paris (1873)
- Scientific career
- Workplaces: International Bureau of Weights and Measures

Justin-Mirande René Benoit or Jean-René Benoit (29 November 1844 – 5 May 1922) was a French physicist who was involved in establishing metric standards as director of the International Bureau of Weights and Measures (Bureau International des Poids et Mesures) from 1889 to 1915. He was involved in moving from a physical definition of the unit of length to one based on the wavelength of light.

Benoit was born in Montpellier where his father, Justin Benoit, was dean of the medicine school. He too studied medicine but moved to study physics at the École des Hautes Études, examining electrical resistance and temperature for his doctorate which he received in 1873. He worked in the industry before joining the International Bureau of Weights and Measures. He worked along with Albert A. Michelson and based on their findings, Benoit suggested using the light wave as a unit for defining length. They established a definition based on the wavelength determined through interferometry and based on the red spectral line of cadmium.
