= Edouard Henri von Baumhauer =

Dutch chemist

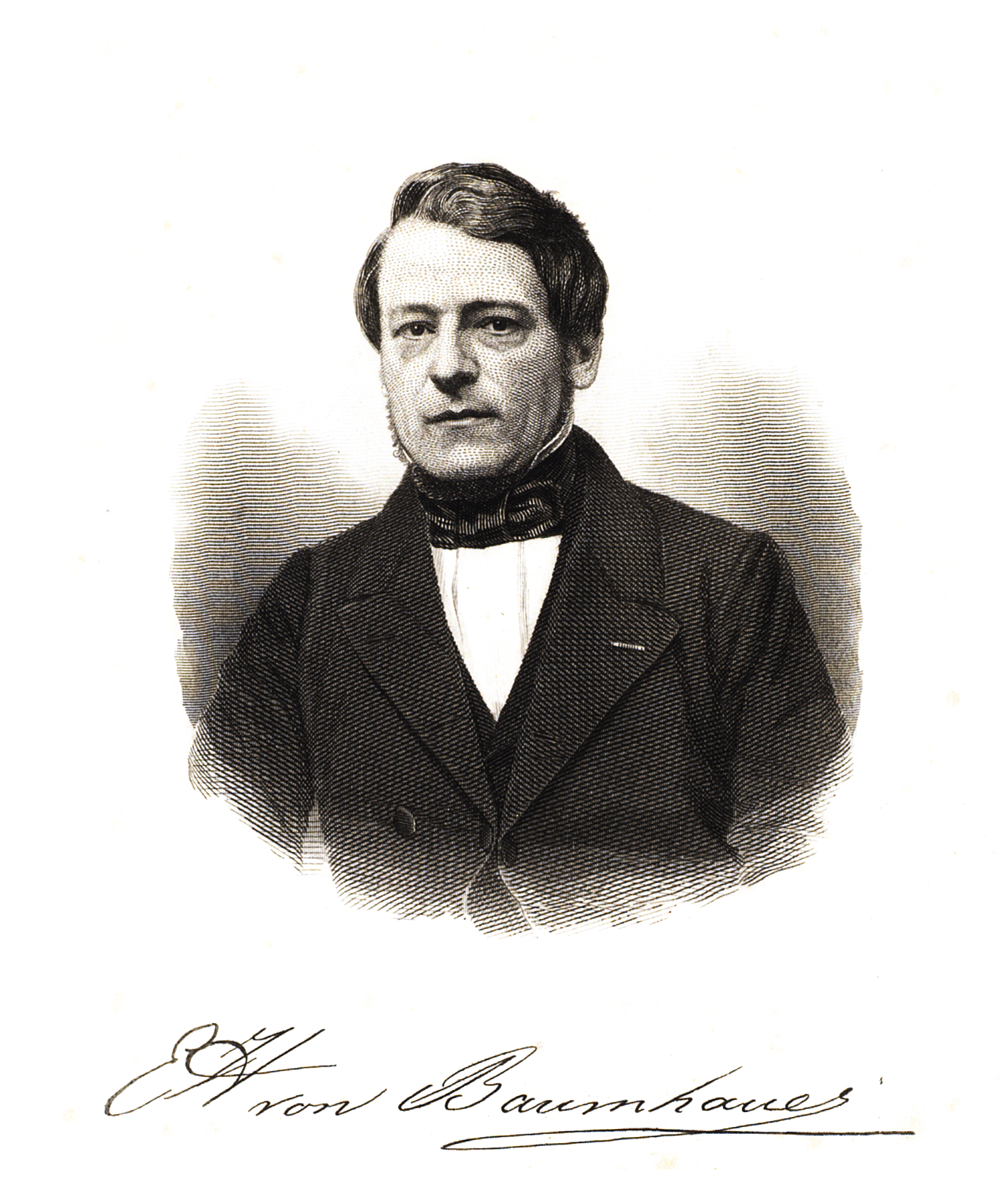

Edouard Hendrik von Baumhauer (8 September 1820 – 18 January 1885) was a Dutch chemist who served as a professor at the University of Amsterdam.

Baumhauer came from a family of German origin some of whom had settled in Maastricht as merchants. Edouard's grandfather had established the trading firm "Goddard Cappel en Zonen". Edouard's was the third son of Willem Theodoor, Advocate General the Supreme Court of Brussels. After studied literature at the University of Utrecht he took an interest in the natural sciences and became an assistant of Gerrit Jan Mulder in 1843. One of his early works was on the composition of meteorites. He received a doctorate in 1844 and differences with Mulder led him to leave Utrecht for Maastricht. He then moved to Amsterdam as a professor of chemistry to succeed Swart.

Among Baumhauer's works were techniques to check the concentration of alcohol which was used for tax computation on drinks. He came up with the hypothesis that metallic dust, especially iron from meteorites gave rise to the aurora borealis and its magnetic effects.

Baumhauer married Elizabeth Petronella Boonen (d. 1889) in 1848.

In 1877, he was elected as a member of the American Philosophical Society.
