= Jean Nicolas Fortin =

French maker of scientific instruments

Jean Nicolas Fortin (1750–1831) was a French maker of scientific instruments, born on 9 August 1750 in Mouchy-la-Ville in Picardy. Among his customers were such noted scientists as Lavoisier, for whom he made a precision balance, Gay-Lussac, François Arago and Pierre Dulong.

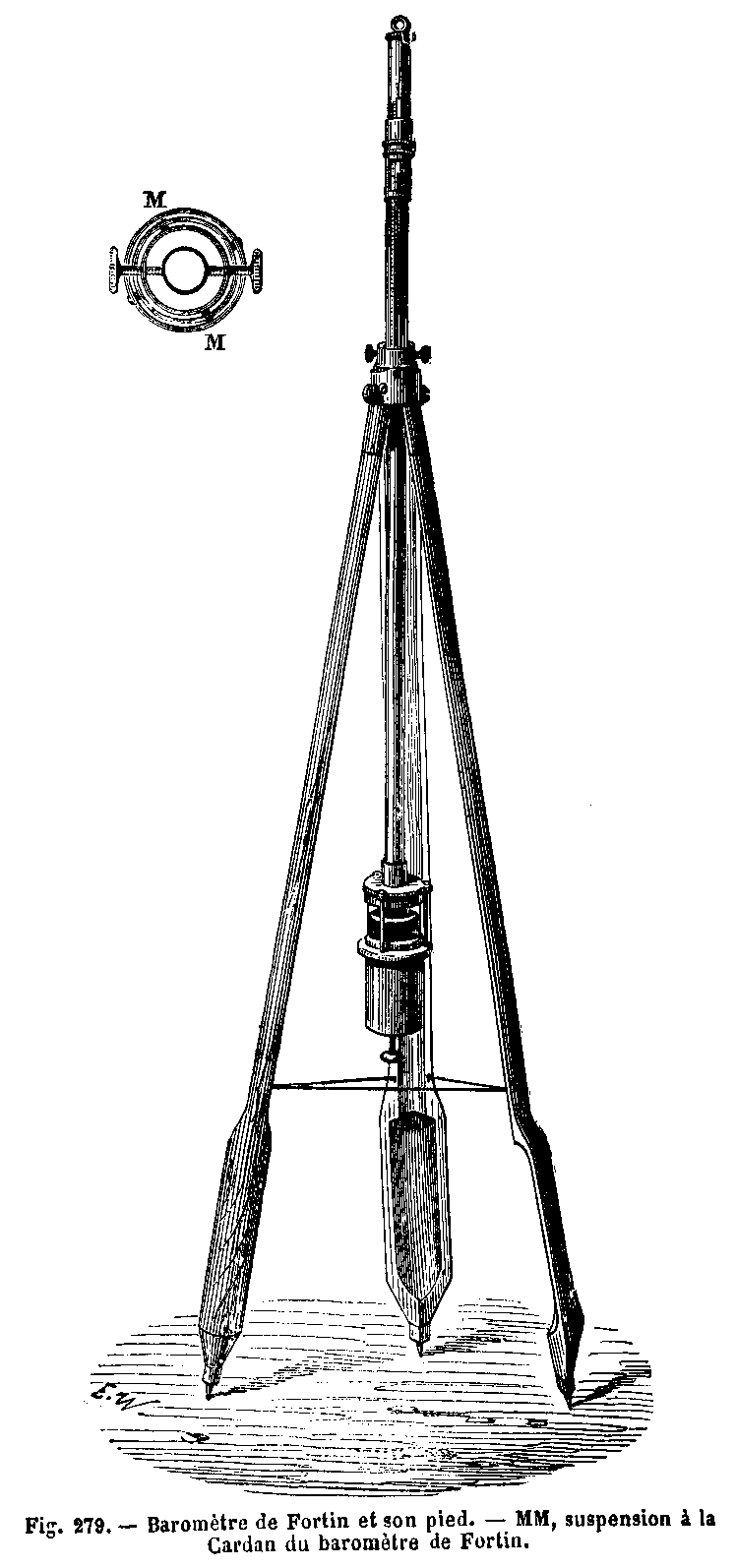
Fortin barometer

Fortin is chiefly remembered for his design of barometer, now called a Fortin barometer, which he introduced in about 1800. In this, the mercury cistern has a glass portion through which the mercury exposed to the atmosphere can be seen, and an ivory needle which was made just to touch its mirror image in the mercury before the reading was taken. This allows for the fact that, when the mercury column in the closed tube falls, the level in the cistern rises, and the difference in height between the two cannot be accurately determined unless the height of the latter is taken into account.

In 1776 Fortin produced the Atlas céleste de Flamstéed, a revised and updated edition of Flamsteed's Atlas Coelestis (celestial atlas) of 1729, at about 1/3 of the original scale and in French. Maps from a later 1795 edition of this work were used by Messier to show the location of his discoveries.

On 15 May 1831 he died in Mouchy-le-Châtel (Oise).

== Bibliography ==
- "Fortin, Jean Nicolas". Encyclopedia.com.
