= Heinrich von Wild =

Swiss meteorologist and physicist (1833–1902)

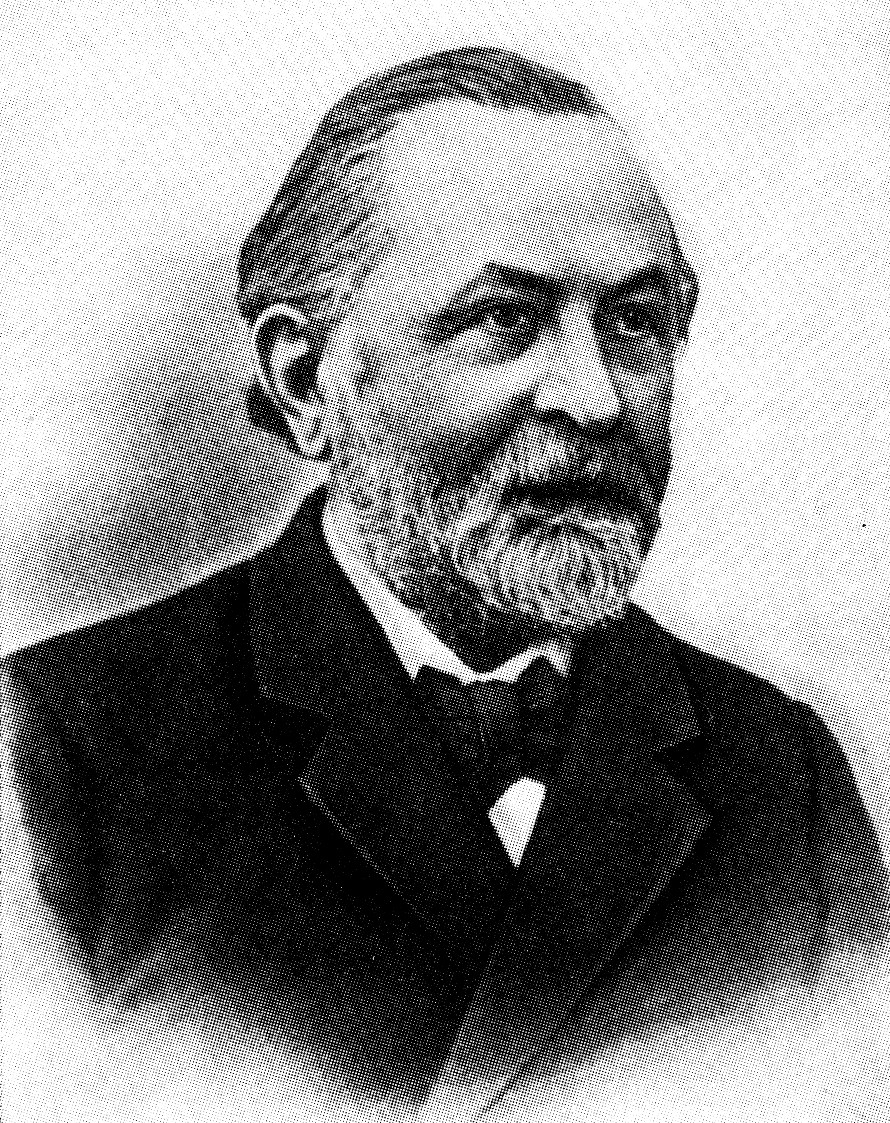
- Born: 17 December 1833; Uster, Switzerland
- Died: 5 September 1902 (aged 68); Zurich, Switzerland

Academic work
- Discipline: meteorology physics metrology
- Institutions: University of Bern
- Notable works: Temperaturverhältnisse des russischen Reichs

Heinrich von Wild or Heinrich Wild I (17 December 1833 – 5 September 1902) was a Swiss meteorologist and physicist who established a modern meteorological system throughout the Russian Empire and developed meteorological instruments. He contributed significantly to international scientific collaboration in the fields of metrology and meteorology as a representative of Russia at the Paris diplomatic Conference which resulted in the Metre Convention of 1875, then as a member of the International Committee of Weights and Measures and as president of the International Meteorological Organization from 1879 to 1896.

== Biography ==
He was born on 17 December 1833 at Uster (Canton Zurich), and was educated at Zurich, Königsberg, and Heidelberg. In 1858 he was appointed professor of physics and director of the observatory at Bern. He enlarged that institution into a central meteorological bureau and laid the foundation of the extensive meteorological system of Switzerland. He was appointed director of the Swiss federal Commission to maintain the Standards of Weights and Measures in 1864. In 1868 he was called to Saint Petersburg, where he completely reorganized the observatory and established a meteorological system throughout the Empire and founded the meteorological observatories at Pavlovsk and Irkutsk. He represented Russia at the diplomatic conférence of the Metre Convention and at the International Committee for Weights and Measures. In 1879, he was appointed president of the International Meteorological Organization. Until his retirement in 1895 he remained in the service of the Russian government.

Alexey Krylov, who became the director of the Observatory in 1916, studied Wild's archive and wrote in his memoir about Wild's scientific achievements, management style, and frictions with the petty Russian bureaucracy.

Wild was a man of great learning and extraordinary industriousness. He left an enormous quantity of computational works; apparently, he wanted to derive general laws from the massive volume of observations. He subjected these observations to harmonic analysis with annual and daily periods for a given location and attempted to apply expansions in spherical harmonics to different locations, similar to what Gauss did in relation to terrestrial magnetism. He built original and most accurate magnetic devices, stationary for the magnetic observatory in Pavlovsk and portable for magnetic surveys.

He strictly monitored the employees’ work. From each year of his administration, bound notebooks survived titled Berichte des Smotritels (Supervisors’ Accounts) and Tagebuch (Diary). Browsing through Berichte des Smotritels, I noticed Wild’s comment, “See correspondence with the state controller.” It turned out that on the occasion of a severe winter, stored firewood was not sufficient, and the supervisor asked permission to buy firewood out of the amount marked for another paragraph in the budget. By accounting rules, it was permissible to transfer amounts from one article to another, but to transfer amounts from one paragraph to another was not. Apparently not knowing this rule, Wild gave his permission. The Control ordered to recover unauthorized expenditure from him. Hence, the correspondence began.

Being in the Russian Civil Service with the rank of a privy councilor and the title of academician, the Swiss citizen Heinrich Wild wrote a letter to the Swiss ambassador, asking for protection from the cavils of the State Control and an insult (offense) to his dignity by the imposition of a fine (amende) on him. The Swiss ambassador notified Wild that he sent a protest to the State Control through the Ministry of Foreign Affairs, a copy of this protest being enclosed. Most surprising, the State Control sent a letter of apology in French through the Ministry of Foreign Affairs, saying that the recovery (pénalité) was not a fine (amende), was imposed by unfortunate misunderstanding, and was removed.

Krylov includes several anecdotes of this sort.

In 1869, Heinrich von Wild, alongside Otto Wilhelm von Struve and Moritz von Jacobi, wrote a report from the Saint Petersburg Academy of Sciences addressed to the French Academy of Sciences inviting his French counterpart to undertake joint action in order to ensure the use of the metre in all scientific work. Then he was a fervent promoter of the foundation of a permanent International Bureau for Weights and Measures, the creation of which he presided to by representing Russia successively in the International Metre Commission, the Committee for Preparatory Research, the Permanent Committee which was boycotted by Russia, Austria and Germany, the International Committee for Weights and Measures and at the Diplomatic Conference of the Metre in 1875.

Wild was elected an extraordinary member in 1868, then ordinary member of the Russian Academy of Science in 1870, corresponding member of the Prussian Academy of Sciences in 1881, honorary member of the National Academy of Sciences of Argentina in 1883, member of the American Academy of Art and Sciences in 1885, the Royal Swedish Academy of Sciences in 1891 and the Accademia dei Lincei in 1895. He died at Zurich on 5 September 1902.

== Inventions ==
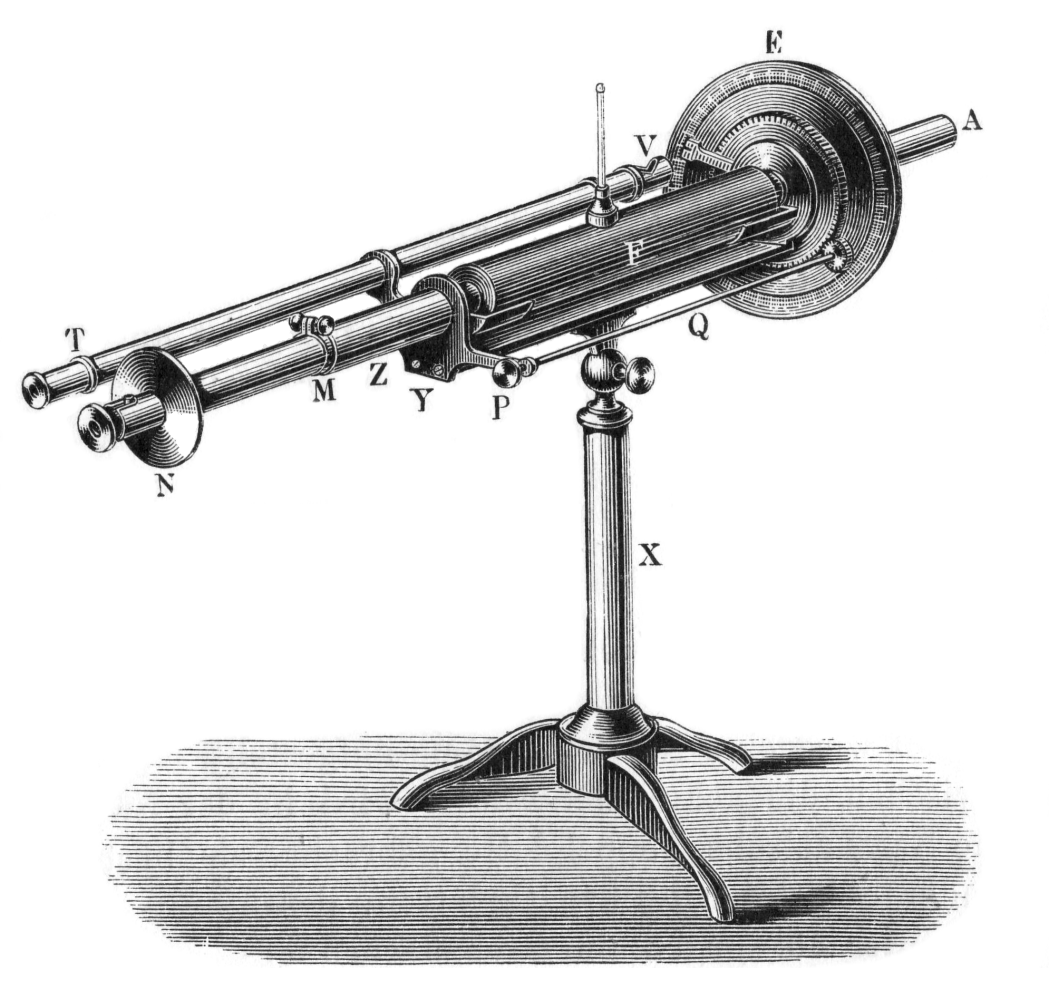
Wild's Polaristrobometer

He invented the polaristrobometer—a form of saccharimeter—a polarization photometer, a magnetic theodolite, and various new optical methods for comparing measures of length.

== Writing ==
Many of his papers were published in the Annalem des physikalischen Observatoriums für Russland and the Neues Repertorium für Meteorologie, founded by himself in 1865 and 1869 respectively; and also in the Mitteilungen of the International Polar Commission, of which he was president (1882–83). He published, furthermore, the great work Temperaturverhältnisse des russischen Reichs (Temperature Conditions in the Russian Empire, tables, atlas, etc., 1876; German and Russian).
