= Gilberto Govi (physicist) =

Italian physicist and science historian

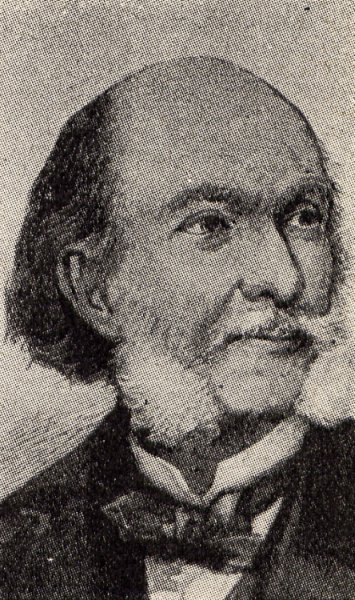
- Govi in 1882
- Born: 21 September 1826; Mantua, Italy
- Died: 30 June 1889 (aged 62); Rome, Italy
- Education: University of Padua
- Scientific career
- Workplaces: University of Turin; International Bureau of Weights and Measures; University of Naples

Gilberto Govi (21 September 1826 – 30 June 1889) was an Italian physicist and science historian.

== Early life and education ==
Govi was born in Mantua, Lombardy, to Quirin Govi and Anne Alles in 1826. After completing his gymnasium and high school studies in Mantua, at the wish of his father he enrolled in 1844 in the faculty of law of the University of Padua. In 1846, he abandoned his legal studies and enrolled in the faculty of mathematics.

After graduating from the University of Padua, he enlisted as a volunteer the Sardinian army in 1848 and fought in the First Italian War of Independence. After the battle of Sorio Govi fled to Milan and then to Paris where he enrolled at the École polytechnique where he studied chemistry under Edmond Frémy and Michel Eugène Chevreul.

Having become part of Parisian scientific circles, he met Guglielmo Libri who introduced him to the history of science, and particularly to the study on Leonardo da Vinci manuscripts. Eager to return to Italy, in 1856 Govi accepted an offer to join the Technical Institute of Florence. In Florence, he continued his research on the history of science, now also focusing on Galileo. In 1861 he left for the University of Turin where he became full professor and director of the physics laboratory in 1863.

In addition to his teaching, he was involved in a variety of activities. In 1867, he served as secretary of the Ministerial Committee established by Michele Coppino to reform higher education in Italy. Among others, he was a member of the National Commission for the Recovery of Leonardo's Autographs and Unpublished Drawings which allowed him to study Leonardo's Milanese manuscripts.

== Career ==
=== International work ===
In 1861 Govi took part at the National Exhibition in Florence as an inspector for precision mechanics and physics sector which highlighted the industrial and scientific capabilities of the newly unified Italy.

This appointment would be followed by others: he served as a juror at the international expositions in London (1862), Paris (1868 and 1878), and Vienna (1873). Govi was also government commissioner and juror at the international geographical exposition (Paris, 1875) and the international electrical exposition (Paris, 1881).

In 1872, he was sent to Paris as a member of the International Commission on the Prototype Meter, established in 1869 to unify the metric system. In 1875, he was elected a member of the Italian Standing Committee and subsequently the first director of the International Bureau of Weights and Measures, which was tasked with preserving the prototypes and serving as a research office for the refinement of the metric system. Govi moved to Paris, where he remained for two years.

In Paris, Govi supervised the construction of the BIPM buildings and the installation of the new measuring instruments. His director tenure was cut short in 1877 with his resignation so as not to forfeit his entitlement to a retirement pension after twenty years of teaching at Italian universities. This resignation was granted to him on October 1, 1877, although he remained a member of the International Committee on Weights and Measures until 1889.

=== Return to Italy ===
After accepting the directorship of the Vittorio Emanuele II Library in Rome in 1877, he was appointed in 1878 to the chair of experimental physics at the University of Naples, a position he held until his death.

In addition to his teaching and scientific career, his patriotism led him to a variety of other positions. He was a member of the Higher Council of the State Archives (1880) and a member of the Higher Council of Public Education (1881–1886). Govi was a member of numerous academies and scientific societies including the Accademia dei Lincei, the Lombard Institute of Sciences and Letters, and the Virgilian Academy of Sciences and Letters. He was named a Knight of the Legion of Honour of France, a Knight of the Order of the Crown of Italy (1870), and a Commander of the same Order (1873).

He accepted a seat in Parliament that the electoral college of Reggio Emilia had entrusted to him in 1883 (XV legislature of the Kingdom of Italy). However, he soon relinquished this honor in the pursuit of science.

=== History of science ===
Govi continued his passion for the history of science. From 1878 he was the director of the Physics Museum of the University of Naples.

In 1885 Govi published the first printed edition of Claudius Ptolemy’s Optics, reconstructing it from recovered Latin manuscripts, and the following year three historical notes on Galileo, Torricelli and Volta. In 1887, the Comptes rendus de Paris contained a paper by Govi, On Newton’s Color Wheel, and in 1888 a letter concerning Galileo’s invention of the compound microscope.

Govi applied his expertise in physics and historical scientific instruments to help organize Galileo’s scientific manuscripts influencing the foundational structure of the 20-volume collection printed between 1890 and 1909.

Govi was a tireless researcher and his reputation as a historian of science was, not only in Italy and France, but among scholars in every country, as great as it was well-deserved.

Govi died in Rome on the night of June 29–30, 1889.
