= International Meteorological Organization =

International organization for meteorology from 1873 to 1951

- Founded: 1873
- Dissolved: 1951

The International Meteorological Organization (IMO; 1873–1951) was the first organization formed with the purpose of exchanging weather information among the countries of the world. It came into existence from the realization that weather systems move across country boundaries; and that knowledge of pressure, temperature, precipitations, etc., upstream and downstream are needed for weather forecasting. It was superseded by the World Meteorological Organization.

== History ==
The Renaissance brought significant development of instruments to measure atmospheric phenomena and scales to compare them. Subsequent developments in atmospheric science in the 18th century confirmed the need for widespread measurement and uniform transnational measurement scales. In the early 19th century, countries began to share meteorological data, and on this basis a conference was held in Cambridge in 1845 with representation by the leading British and European meteorologists, including:

- Austrian Empire (Bohemia) – John Parish von Senftenberg, the founder of the Astronomical, Magnetic and Meteorological Observatory at Senftenberg (now Žamberk);
- Austrian Empire (Bohemia) – Karl Kreil, Director of the Imperial Observatory of Prague;
- Kingdom of Bavaria – Johann von Lamont, Director of the Bogenhausen Observatory in Münich;
- Prussia – Georg Adolf Erman, circumnavigator and meteorologist, professor at Friedrich-Wilhelms-Universität (Humboldt University of Berlin);
- Prussia – Dr. Palon Heinrich Ludwig von Bogusławski, Director of the Royal Prussian Observatory in Breslau (Wrocław);
- Prussia – Heinrich Wilhelm Dove of the Friedrich-Wilhelms-Universität;
- Russia – Adolph Theodor Kupffer, Director-General of the Russian System of Magnetic and Meteorological Observation;
- John Frederick William Herschel, committee chairman for the conference;
- Wolfgang Sartorius von Waltershausen, geologist;
- George Peacock, Dean of Ely;
- William Whewell, astronomer;
- Humphrey Lloyd, physicist;
- George Biddell Airy, the Astronomer Royal;
- Edward Sabine, astronomer and geophysicist;
- Thomas MacDougall Brisbane, astronomer;
- John Phillips, geologist.

Matthew Fontaine Maury, of the US Navy, initiated the convening of the first true international meteorological conference from late August through early September 1853. The conference opened its proceedings at Brussels, Belgium, on 23 August 1853, in the residence of M. Piercot, the Minister of the Interior. The governments represented at the first International Conference, and the names of the officers who attended were :

- Adolphe Quetelet, director of the Royal Observatory of Belgium and general secretary of the Academie royale des sciences, des lettres et des beaux-arts with Victor Lahure, navy captain and general director of the Navy, represented Belgium.
- P. Rothe, navy captain and director of the depot of marine charts represented Denmark.
- A. De la Marche, hydrographic engineer for the imperial navy represented France.
- Frederick William Beechey, captain Royal Navy and member of the Naval Department or the Board of Trade with Henry James, captain Royal Engineers represented the United Kingdom.
- Marin H. Jansen, lieutenant of the Royal navy represented the Netherlands.
- Nils Ihlen, lieutenant of the royal navy represented Norway.
- J. De Mattos Corroêa, captain-lieutenant of the Royal navy represented Portugal.
- Alexis Gorkovenko, captain-lieutenant the Imperial navy represented Russia.
- Carl Anton Pettersson, first lieutenant royal navy represented Sweden.
- Matthew Fontaine Maury, lieutenant of the Navy represented the United States.

C. H. D. Buys Ballot's 1872 paper Suggestions on a Uniform System of Meteorological Observations pushed for the creation of an international body, and a second International Meteorological Congress was held in Vienna, Austria-Hungary, in September 1873 which agreed to begin preparations for an International Meteorological Organization (IMO). There they decided that membership would be the directors of national meteorological services. A Permanent Meteorological Committee was established with Buys Ballot, director of the Dutch meteorological service, becoming the first president.

A second congress in Rome 1879 decided on the IMO establishment and elected an International Meteorological Committee to prepare for the next Conference of Directors. The director of the Central Geophysical Observatory in Saint Petersburg, Swiss born Heinrich von Wild was appointed president, and the head of British Meteorological Office, Robert Scott was appointed secretary. There was however no separate funding. Also the directors agreed on a collaborative research effort with the International Polar Year 1882–1883. The first International Meteorological Tables were published in 1889.

The 1891 Conference of Directors of Meteorological Services convened in Munich. The organization was further refined by electing an Executive Bureau and deciding upon the first permanent topic commission, the Commission for Terrestrial Magnetism.

The 1896 Conference of Directors in Paris established more commissions: the Commission for Radiation and Insolation, and the Commission for Aeronautics. At the same year IMO published the first International Cloud Atlas.

In 1905 the Conference of Directors convened in Innsbruck. Léon Teisserenc de Bort proposed a telegraph-based worldwide weather station network, the Réseau Mondial. Simplifying Teisserenc de Bort's vision, the IMO decided that the network should collect, calculate, and distribute monthly and annual averages for pressure, temperature, and precipitation from a well-distributed sample of land based on meteorological stations, in effect a global climatological database. The distribution standard was two stations within each ten-degree latitude/longitude quadrangle. Ultimately, the network comprises about 500 land stations between 80°N and 61°S. The first annual data set, for 1911, appeared in 1917.

Between the two world wars there were four further Conferences of Directors, 1919 in Paris, 1923 in Utrecht, 1929 in Copenhagen and 1935 in Warsaw. The IMO did not acquire a permanent secretariat until 1926, and the latter's annual budget never exceeded US$20,000.

In September 1929 the Copenhagen Conference of Directors set up a technical Commission For Climatology, which held a meeting at Innsbruck discussing issues such as the relationship between dynamic meteorology and climatology. At its 1934 Wiesbaden meeting the Commission designated the thirty-year period from 1901 to 1930 as the reference time frame for climatological standard normals. the baseline for measuring climate fluctuations.

The 1946 Conference of Directors acknowledged the need for an organisation supported by governments. Preparations continued with conferences in 1947 in Washington DC and 1961 in Paris. In 1951 the World Meteorological Organization became a specialized agency of the United Nations in direct succession of the IMO. The members of the WMO are representatives of their respective countries, not their weather services.

== Presidents ==
- Christophorus Henricus Didericus Buys Ballot (Netherlands), 1873–1879
- Heinrich von Wild (Russia), 1879–1896
- Éleuthère Mascart (France), 1896–1907
- William Napier Shaw (U.K.), 1907–1923
- Ewoud van Everdingen (Netherlands), 1923–1935
- Theodor Hesselberg (Norway), 1935–1946
- Sir Nelson King Johnson (U.K.), 1946–1951

== Sources ==
=== WikiSource links ===
- First International Maritime Conference Held for Devising an Uniform System of Meteorological Observations at Sea (1853)
- Marin H. Jansen
