= 1736 =

1736 in various calendars
- Gregorian calendar: 1736; MDCCXXXVI
- Ab urbe condita: 2489
- Armenian calendar: 1185; ԹՎ ՌՃՁԵ
- Assyrian calendar: 6486
- Balinese saka calendar: 1657–1658
- Bengali calendar: 1142–1143
- Berber calendar: 2686
- British Regnal year: 9 Geo. 2 – 10 Geo. 2
- Buddhist calendar: 2280
- Burmese calendar: 1098
- Byzantine calendar: 7244–7245
- Chinese calendar: 乙卯年 (Wood Rabbit); 4433 or 4226 — to — 丙辰年 (Fire Dragon); 4434 or 4227
- Coptic calendar: 1452–1453
- Discordian calendar: 2902
- Ethiopian calendar: 1728–1729
- Hebrew calendar: 5496–5497
- Hindu calendars
- Vikram Samvat: 1792–1793
- Shaka Samvat: 1657–1658
- Kali Yuga: 4836–4837
- Holocene calendar: 11736
- Igbo calendar: 736–737
- Iranian calendar: 1114–1115
- Islamic calendar: 1148–1149
- Japanese calendar: Kyōhō 21 / Genbun 1 (元文元年)
- Javanese calendar: 1660–1661
- Julian calendar: Gregorian minus 11 days
- Korean calendar: 4069
- Minguo calendar: 176 before ROC 民前176年
- Nanakshahi calendar: 268
- Thai solar calendar: 2278–2279
- Tibetan calendar: ཤིང་མོ་ཡོས་ལོ་ (female Wood-Hare); 1862 or 1481 or 709 — to — མེ་ཕོ་འབྲུག་ལོ་ (male Fire-Dragon); 1863 or 1482 or 710

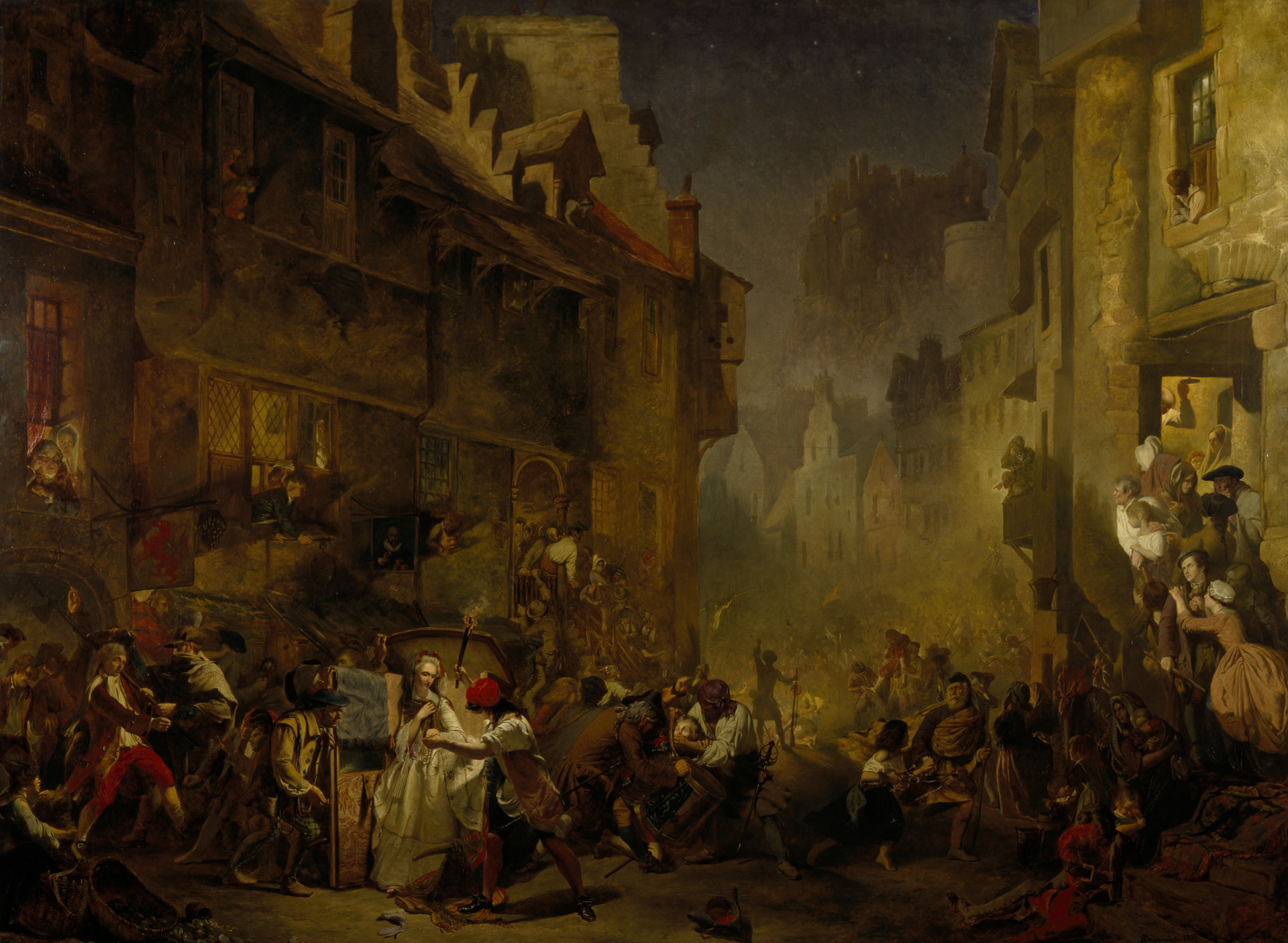
April 14: Porteous Riots erupt in Scotland.

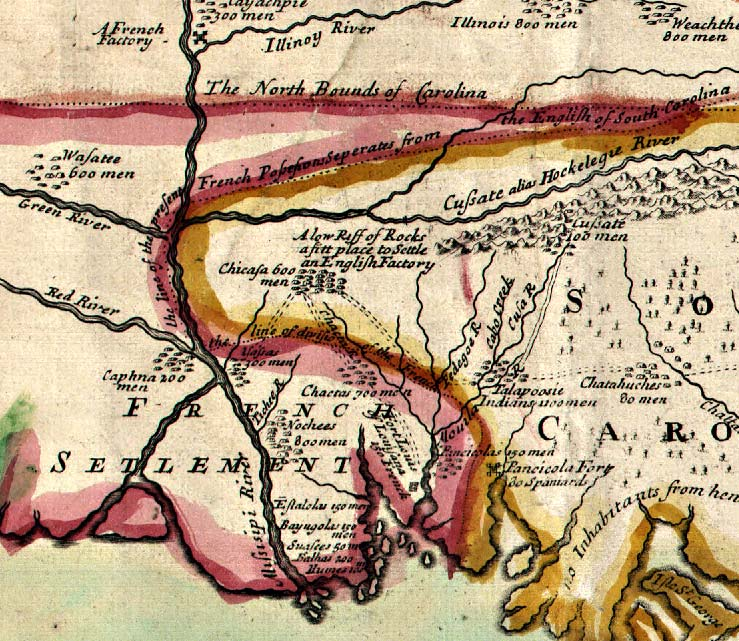
May 26: Battle of Ackia.

1736 (MDCCXXXVI) was a leap year starting on Sunday of the Gregorian calendar and a leap year starting on Thursday of the Julian calendar, the 1736th year of the Common Era (CE) and Anno Domini (AD) designations, the 736th year of the 2nd millennium, the 36th year of the 18th century, and the 7th year of the 1730s decade. As of the start of 1736, the Gregorian calendar was 11 days ahead of the Julian calendar, which remained in localized use until 1923.

== Events ==
=== January–March ===
- January 12 – George Hamilton, 1st Earl of Orkney, becomes the Second Field Marshal of Great Britain.
- January 23 – The Civil Code of 1734 is passed in Sweden.
- January 26 – Stanisław Leszczyński abdicates the throne of Poland, ending his second reign.
- February 12 – Francis I, Holy Roman Emperor marries Maria Theresa of Austria, ruler of the Habsburg Empire at the Augustinian Church in Vienna.
- March 8 – Nader Shah, founder of the Afsharid dynasty, is crowned Shah of Iran on a date selected by court astrologers.
- March 31 – Bellevue Hospital is founded in New York.

=== April–June ===
- April 14
  - The Porteous Riots erupt in Edinburgh (Scotland), after the execution of smuggler Andrew Wilson, when town guard Captain John Porteous orders his men to fire at the crowd. Porteous is arrested later.
  - German adventurer Theodor Stephan Freiherr von Neuhoff is crowned King Theodore of Corsica, 25 days after his arrival on Corsica on March 20. His reign ends on November 5 when he flees the island.
- April 19 – A fire in Stony Stratford, England, consumes 53 houses.
- April – The Genbun era begins in Japan. The era of Kyōhō Reforms ends.
- May 8 – Frederick, Prince of Wales, marries Princess Augusta of Saxe-Gotha.
- May 22 – King George II of Great Britain departs for Europe as part of his duties as Elector of Hanover; his wife, Caroline, Queen Consort rules on his behalf as the Regent for the last time until his return on January 14, 1736.
- May 26 – Battle of Ackia: British and Chickasaw Native Americans defeat French troops.
- June 8 – Leonhard Euler writes to James Stirling describing the Euler–Maclaurin formula, providing a disconnection between integrals and sums.
- June 19 – A French Academy of Sciences expedition, led by Pierre Louis Maupertuis, with Anders Celsius, begins work on measuring a meridian arc in Torne Valley, Finland.
- June 24 – Witchcraft Act 1735 (9 Geo. 2. c. 5) in Great Britain comes into effect, criminalizing claimants accusing people of practising witchcraft or of possessing magical powers, intended to end legal witch trials in the early modern period in the country.

=== July–September ===
- July 1 – Russo-Turkish War (1735–39): Russian forces under Peter Lacy storm the Ottoman fortress of Azov.
- August 12 – A fire in Saint Petersburg, capital of the Russian Empire, destroys 2,000 buildings, the city's post office, and several palaces.
- September 7 – An Edinburgh crowd drags John Porteous out of his cell in Tolbooth Prison, and lynches him.
- September 29 – The Gin Act 1736 goes into effect, placing a steep tax on the sale of gin and license requirements for its sale, with the intent of reducing consumption of the liquor in Britain. Widely ignored, the Act is repealed in 1743.
- September 30 – The Lebanese Council of 1736 begins, a major turning point in the reform of the Maronite Church. In the following three days, the assembled Maronite and Latin clergy presided by Yusuf ibn Siman as-Simani discuss various reforms and elaborate rules and canons.

=== October–December ===
- October 3 – French scientist Charles Marie de La Condamine and a team of surveyors begin the first measurements at the Equator to determine the exact meridian arc measurement of distance between points separated by one degree of longitude in order to make a precise calculation of the Earth's circumference. The initial measurements of this French Geodesic Mission to the Equator, made in what is now Ecuador, last until November 3. The same year the French Geodesic Mission to Lapland took place. Both confirm Isaac Newton's prediction that the Figure of the Earth is flattened at the poles.
- November 5 – King Theodore of Corsica flees the island after a reign of seven months and the kingdom reverts to Genoese control.
- November 13 – Word of the discovery of silver, south of what is now the U.S.-Mexican border, reaches Sonora Governor Juan Bautista Anza and soon leads to prospectors coming to Nogales to find more silver. Late in October, a Yaqui Indian prospector, Antonio Siraumea, had discovered large slabs of silver ("Las planchas de plata"), and at the Estancia Arizona, a ranch owned by Captain Bernardo de Urrea. The region, and later the U.S. territory, and state of Arizona are named for Urrea's ranch.
- December 7 – Benjamin Franklin builds the first volunteer fire company in Philadelphia.
- December 26 – Andrew Michael Ramsay gives an oration, in which he relates the heritage and internationalism of Freemasonry to that of the Crusades.

=== Date unknown ===
- Neustrelitz becomes the capital of Mecklenburg-Strelitz.
- Bushehr is founded in Persia.
- The Belgrade Fortress is completed.
- One of the earliest records of use of a bathing machine is made at Scarborough, England.
- Charles Marie de La Condamine, with François Fresneau Gataudière, makes the first scientific observations of rubber, in Ecuador.
- Leonhard Euler produces the first published proof of Fermat's "little theorem".
- Sir Isaac Newton's Method of Fluxions (1671), describing his method of differential calculus, is first published (posthumously) and Thomas Bayes publishes a defense of its logical foundations (anonymously).
- Muhammad ibn Abd al-Wahhab writes the Kitab at-tawhidt, marking the beginning of Wahhabism.
- The Haidamakas raid the shtetl of Pavoloch, killing 35.

== Births ==
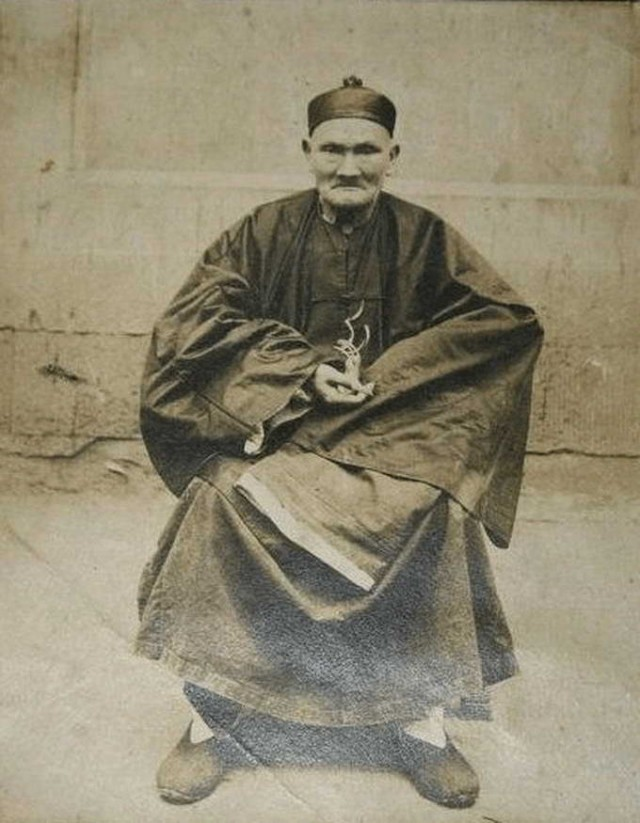
Li Ching-Yuen

- January 7 – Andrew Adams, American judge (d. 1797)

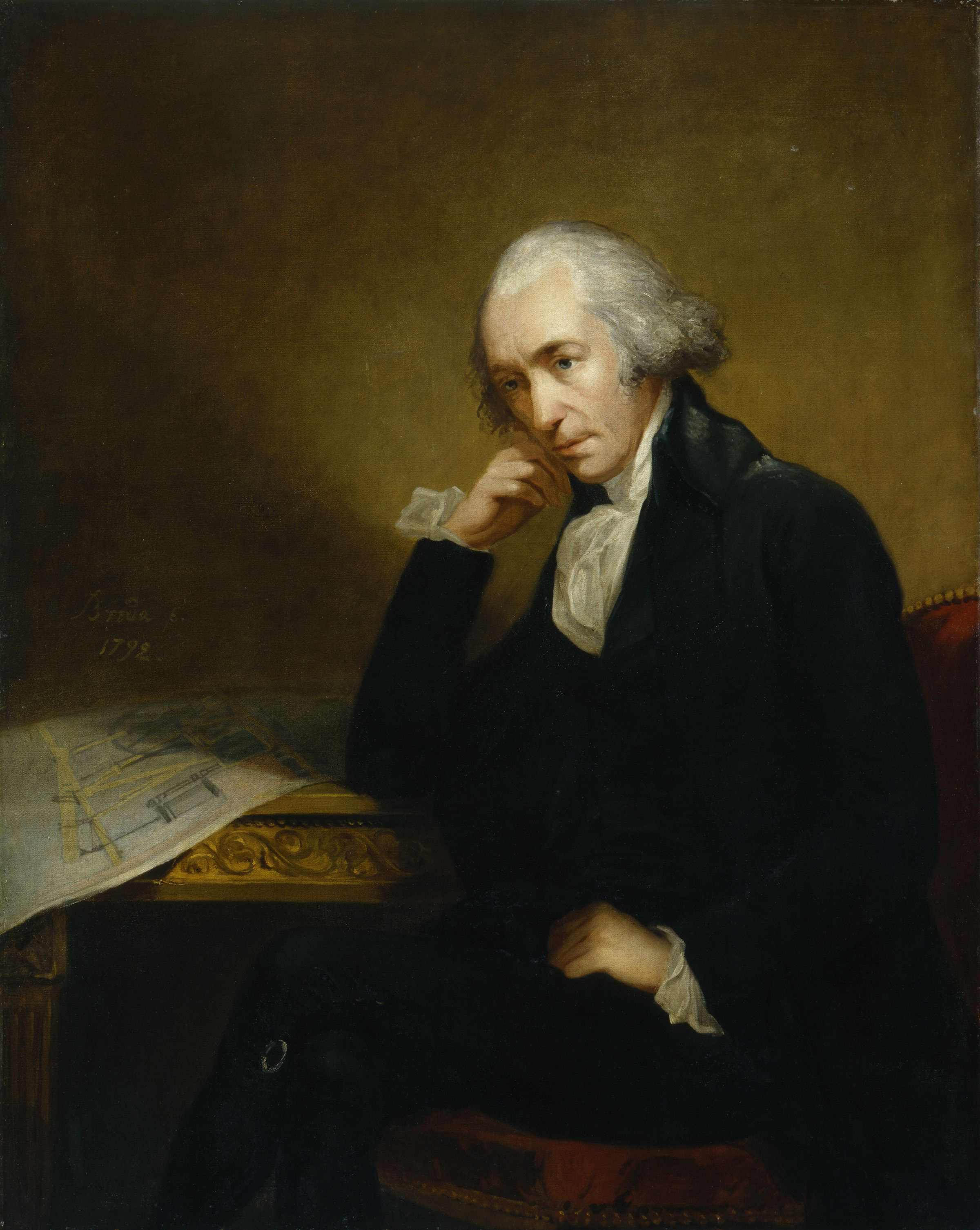
James Watt

- January 19 – James Watt, Scottish inventor (d. 1819)
- January 25 – Joseph-Louis Lagrange, Italian-born mathematician (d. 1813)
- February 3 – Johann Georg Albrechtsberger, Austrian musician (d. 1809)
- February 29 – Ann Lee, English-born American religious leader (d. 1784)
- March 20 – Rama I, First King of Siam (d. 1809)
- May 8 – Caterina Dolfin, Italian (Venetian) poet (d. 1793)
- May 10 – George Steevens, English literary critic (d. 1800)
- May 29 – Patrick Henry, American patriot (d. 1799)
- June 3 – Sir John Acton, 6th Baronet, Prime Minister of Naples (d. 1811)
- June 7 – Fermín Lasuén, Spanish missionary (d. 1803)

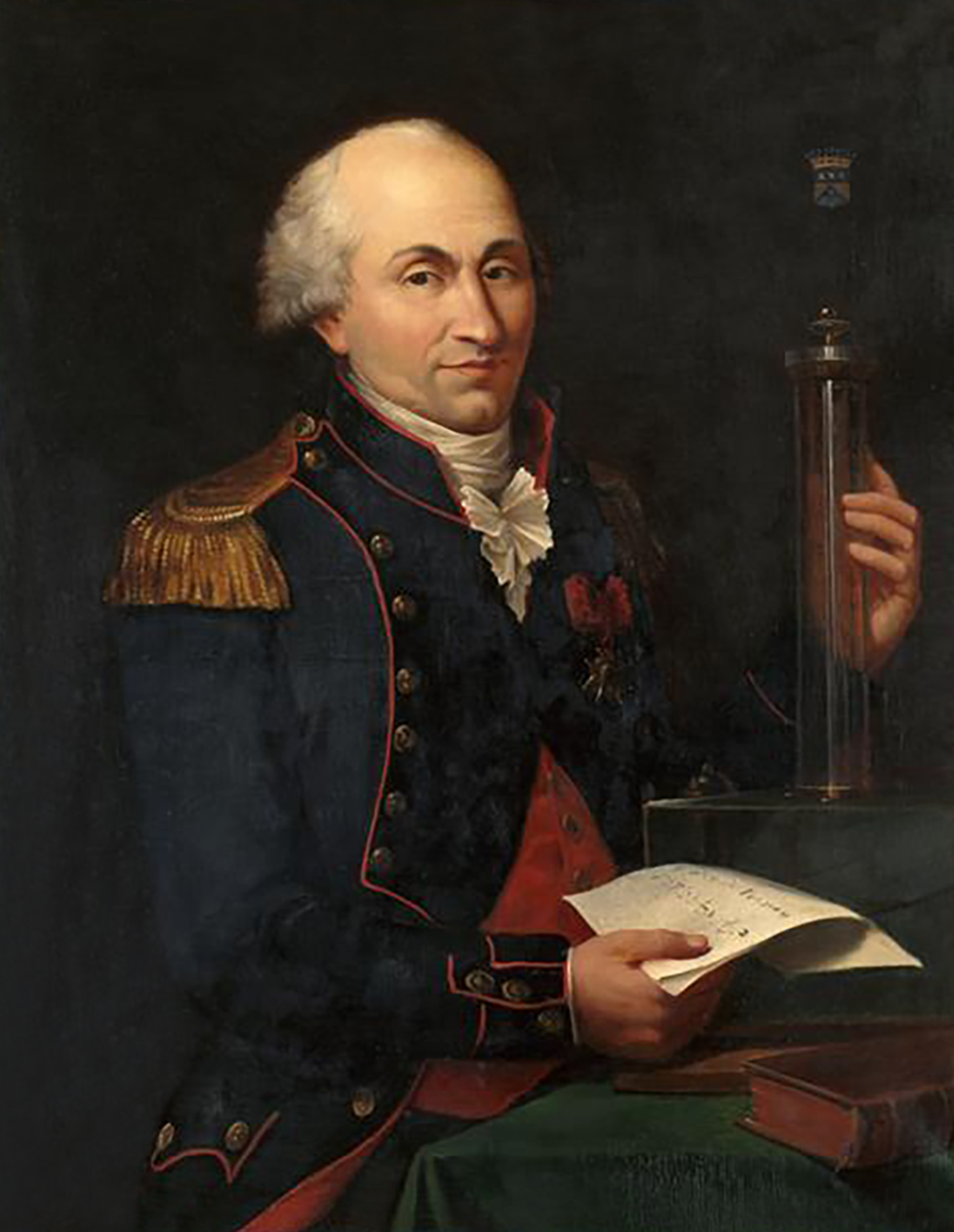
Charles-Augustin de Coulomb

- June 14 – Charles-Augustin de Coulomb, French physicist (d. 1806)
- June 21 – Enoch Poor, American general (d. 1780)
- June 25 – John Horne Tooke, English politician, philologist (d. 1812)
- July – Juan Bautista de Anza, Governor of the Spanish Province of New Mexico (d. 1788)
- August 9 – Louis Joseph, Prince of Condé (d. 1818)
- August 15 – Alexander Runciman, Scottish painter (d. 1785)
- August 26 – Jean-Baptiste L. Romé de l'Isle, French geologist (d. 1790)
- September 15 – Jean Sylvain Bailly, French astronomer (d. 1793)
- September 16 – Carter Braxton, signer of the American Declaration of Independence (d. 1797)
- October 27 – James Macpherson, Scottish poet (d. 1796)
- date unknown
  - Robert Jephson, Irish dramatist (d. 1803)
  - Li Ching-Yuen, Chinese herbalist, martial artist and tactical advisor (d.1933) (claimed)
  - Pierre le Pelley I, Seigneur of Sark (d. 1778)
  - Claudius Smith, American revolutionary (d. 1779)
  - Sir James Tylney-Long, 7th Baronet, English politician (d. 1794)

== Deaths ==
- January 8 – Jean Leclerc (theologian), Swiss theologian and biblical scholar (b. 1657)
- January 17 – Matthäus Daniel Pöppelmann, German architect (b. 1662)
- January 31 – Filippo Juvarra, Italian architect (b. 1678)
- February 1 – James Stanley, 10th Earl of Derby, English politician (b. 1664)
- February 7 – Stephen Gray, English dyer, astronomer, and scientist (b. 1666)
- March 16 – Giovanni Battista Pergolesi, Italian composer (b. 1710)
- March 25 – Nicholas Hawksmoor, British architect (b. c. 1661)

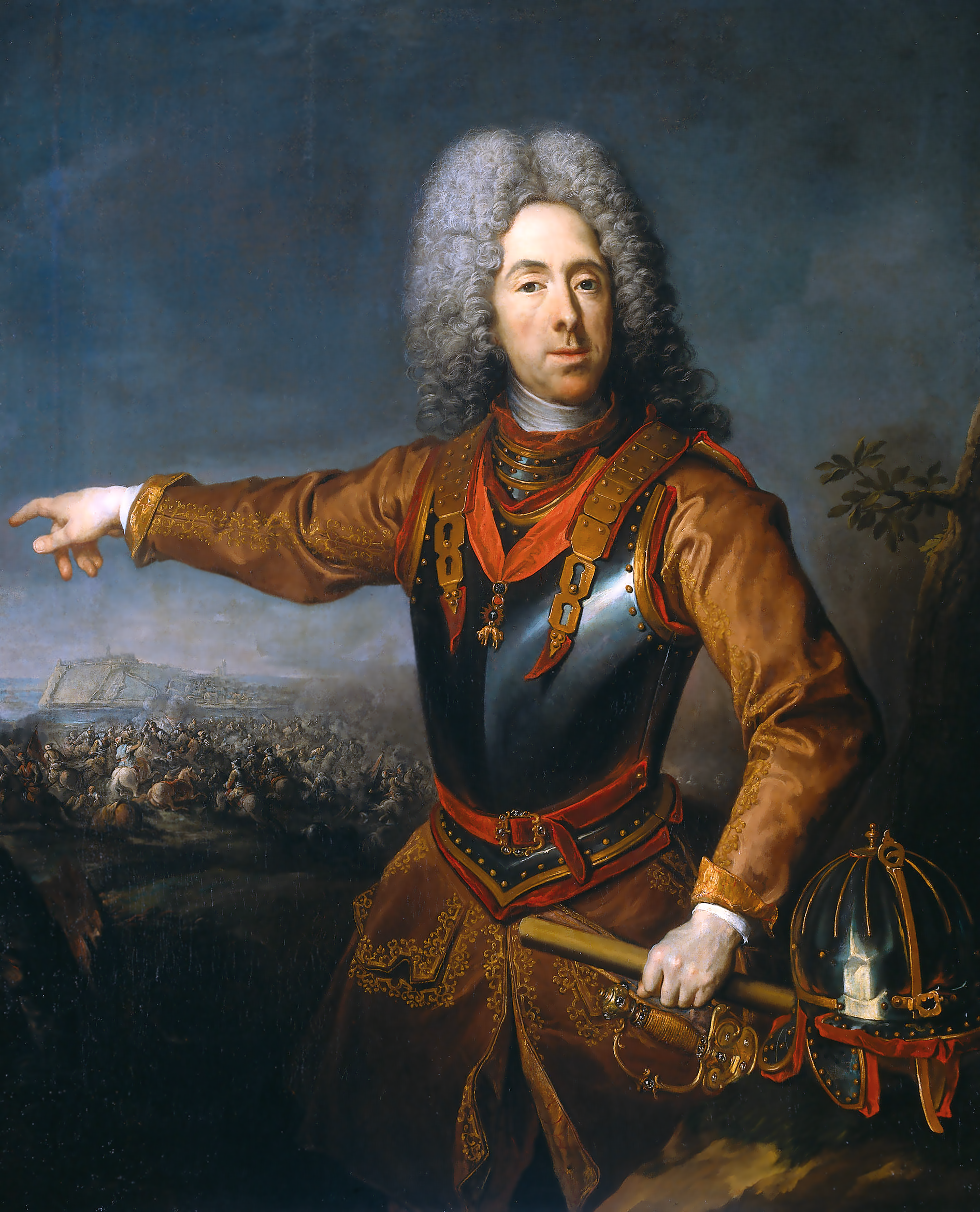
Prince Eugene of Savoy

- April 21 – Prince Eugene of Savoy, French-born Austrian general (b. 1663)
- April 30 – Johann Albert Fabricius, German scholar and bibliographer (b. 1668)
- May 9 – Diogo de Mendonça Corte-Real, Portuguese politician (b. 1658)
- June 6 – Jean Baptiste de La Vérendrye, explorer of New France, eldest son of Pierre Gaultier de Varennes et de La Vérendrye (b. 1713)
- July 1 – Ahmed III, Ottoman Sultan (b. 1673)
- July 7 – William Hardres, British politician (b. 1686)
- August 14 – Victor Honoré Janssens, Flemish painter (b. 1658)

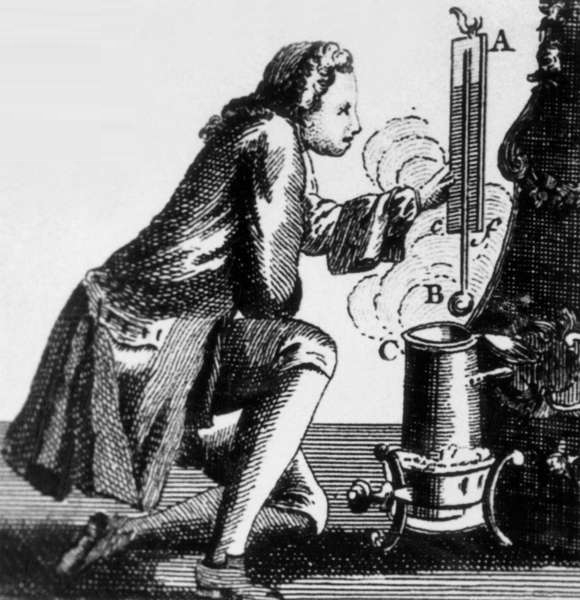
Daniel Gabriel Fahrenheit

- September 6 – John Porteous, Scottish captain (b. c. 1695)
- September 16 – Daniel Gabriel Fahrenheit, German physicist and inventor (b. 1686)
- September 26 – Louise Diane d'Orléans, youngest child of Philippe II, Duke of Orléans (b. 1716)
- October 22 – George Clarke, English politician, architect (b. 1661)
- November 2 – Louis Antoine de Pardaillan de Gondrin, French duke (b. 1664)
- December 10 – António Manoel de Vilhena, Portuguese 66th Grandmaster of the Knights Hospitaller (b. 1663)
- December 12 (burial) – Antonina Houbraken, Dutch draughtswoman (b. 1686)
- December 22 – Sir William Robinson, 1st Baronet, British politician (b. 1655)
- December 26 – Antonio Caldara, Italian composer (b. 1670)
- date unknown
  - Anna Colbjørnsdatter, Norwegian heroine (b. 1667)
  - Chen Shu, Chinese painter (b. 1660)
