= Charles Étienne Louis Camus =

French mathematician (1699–1768)

Charles Étienne Louis Camus (23 August 1699 – 2 February 1768), was a French mathematician and mechanician who was born at Crécy-en-Brie, near Meaux in the province of Île-de-France.

He studied mathematics, civil and military architecture, and astronomy after leaving Collège de Navarre in Paris. In 1730 he was appointed professor of architecture and, in 1733, associate of the Académie des Sciences. He also became a professor of geometry, secretary to the Academy of Architecture and fellow of the Royal Society of London. In 1727 he presented a memoir to the academy on masting ships, in consequence of which he was named the same year joint mechanician to that body. In 1736 he accompanied Pierre Louis Maupertuis and Alexis Clairaut in the expedition to Lapland for the measurement of a degree of meridian arc. He was the author of a Cours de mathématiques (Paris, 1766), and a number of essays on mathematical and mechanical subjects.

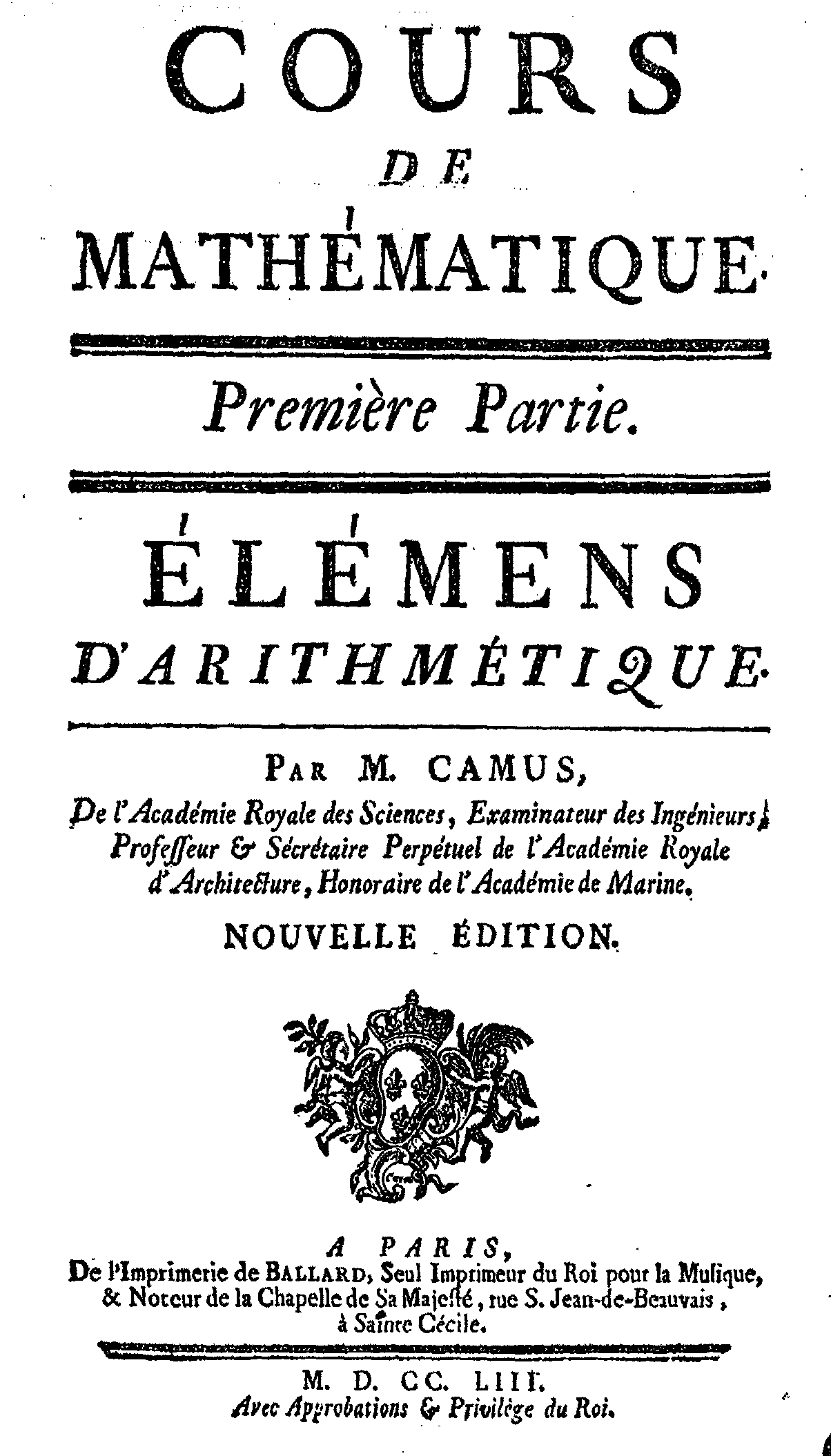
Camus, Cours de mathématique (1753).

In 1760 he became perpetual secretary of the academy of architecture. He was also employed in a variety of public works, and in 1765 was chosen a fellow of the Royal Society of London. He died in 1768.

== Works ==
- Opérations faites pour mesurer le degré de méridienne entre Paris et Amiens; 1757.
- Cours de mathématique ("Course of mathematics"); 3 parts, 1749–52.
  - Part 1: Élémens d'arithmétique (1749).
  - Part 2: Élémens de géométrie, théorique et pratique (1750).
  - Part 3: Élémens de méchanique statique (1751–52).
