= Meridian arc =

Distance along a portion of a meridian, for use in geodesy

In geodesy and navigation, a meridian arc is the curve between two points near the Earth's surface having the same longitude. The term may refer either to a segment of the meridian, or to its length. Both the practical determination of meridian arcs (employing measuring instruments in field campaigns) and their theoretical calculation (based on geometry and abstract mathematics) have been pursued for many years.

== Measurement ==
The purpose of measuring meridian arcs is to determine a figure of the Earth. One or more measurements of meridian arcs can be used to infer the shape of the reference ellipsoid that best approximates the geoid in the region of the measurements. Measurements of meridian arcs at several latitudes along many meridians around the world can be combined in order to approximate a geocentric ellipsoid intended to fit the entire world.

The earliest determinations of the size of a spherical Earth required a single arc. Accurate survey work beginning in the 19th century required several arc measurements in the region the survey was to be conducted, leading to a proliferation of reference ellipsoids around the world. The latest determinations use astro-geodetic measurements and the methods of satellite geodesy to determine reference ellipsoids, especially the geocentric ellipsoids now used for global coordinate systems such as WGS 84 (see numerical expressions).

=== History of measurement ===
Early estimations of Earth's size are recorded from Greece in the 4th century BC, and from scholars at the caliph's House of Wisdom in Baghdad in the 9th century. The first realistic value was calculated by Alexandrian scientist Eratosthenes about 240 BC. He estimated that the meridian has a length of 252,000 stadia, with an error on the real value between −2.4% and +0.8% (assuming a value for the stadion between 155 and 160 metres). Eratosthenes described his technique in a book entitled On the measure of the Earth, which has not been preserved. A similar method was used by Posidonius about 150 years later, and slightly better results were calculated in 827 by the arc measurement method, attributed to the Caliph Al-Ma'mun.

==== Ellipsoidal Earth ====
Early literature uses the term oblate spheroid to describe a sphere "squashed at the poles". Modern literature uses the term ellipsoid of revolution in place of spheroid, although the qualifying words "of revolution" are usually dropped. An ellipsoid that is not an ellipsoid of revolution is called a triaxial ellipsoid. Spheroid and ellipsoid are used interchangeably in this article, with oblate implied if not stated.

===== 17th and 18th centuries =====
Although it had been known since classical antiquity that the Earth was spherical, by the 17th century, evidence was accumulating that it was not a perfect sphere. In 1672, Jean Richer found the first evidence that gravity was not constant over the Earth (as it would be if the Earth were a sphere); he took a pendulum clock to Cayenne, French Guiana and found that it lost 2 1/2 minutes per day compared to its rate at Paris. This indicated the acceleration of gravity was less at Cayenne than at Paris. Pendulum gravimeters began to be taken on voyages to remote parts of the world, and it was slowly discovered that gravity increases smoothly with increasing latitude, gravitational acceleration being about 0.5% greater at the geographical poles than at the Equator.

In 1687, Isaac Newton had published in the Principia as a proof that the Earth was an oblate spheroid of flattening equal to 1/230. This was disputed by some, but not all, French scientists. A meridian arc of Jean Picard was extended to a longer arc by Giovanni Domenico Cassini and his son Jacques Cassini over the period 1684–1718. The arc was measured with at least three latitude determinations, so they were able to deduce mean curvatures for the northern and southern halves of the arc, allowing a determination of the overall shape. The results indicated that the Earth was a prolate spheroid (with an equatorial radius less than the polar radius). To resolve the issue, the French Academy of Sciences (1735) undertook expeditions to Peru (Bouguer, Louis Godin, de La Condamine, Antonio de Ulloa, Jorge Juan) and to Lapland (Maupertuis, Clairaut, Camus, Le Monnier, Abbe Outhier, Anders Celsius). The resulting measurements at equatorial and polar latitudes confirmed that the Earth was best modelled by an oblate spheroid, supporting Newton. However, by 1743, Clairaut's theorem had completely supplanted Newton's approach.

By the end of the century, Jean Baptiste Joseph Delambre had remeasured and extended the French arc from Dunkirk to the Mediterranean Sea (the meridian arc of Delambre and Méchain). It was divided into five parts by four intermediate determinations of latitude. By combining the measurements together with those for the arc of Peru, ellipsoid shape parameters were determined and the distance between the Equator and pole along the Paris Meridian was calculated as 5130762 toises as specified by the standard toise bar in Paris. Defining this distance as exactly 10000000 m led to the construction of a new standard metre bar as 0.5130762 toises.

===== 19th century =====
From the French revolution of 1789 came an effort to reform measurement standards, leading ultimately to an extravagant effort to measure the meridian passing through Paris in order to define the metre. The question of measurement reform was placed in the hands of the French Academy of Sciences, who appointed a commission chaired by Jean-Charles de Borda. Instead of the seconds pendulum method, the commission of the French Academy of Sciences – whose members included Borda, Lagrange, Laplace, Monge and Condorcet – decided that the new measure should be equal to one ten-millionth of the distance from the North Pole to the Equator (the quadrant of the Earth's circumference), measured along the meridian passing through Paris at the longitude of Paris pantheon, which became the central geodetic station in Paris. Jean Baptiste Joseph Delambre obtained the fundamental co-ordinates of the Pantheon by triangulating all the geodetic stations around Paris from the Pantheon's dome.

Apart from the obvious consideration of safe access for French surveyors, the Paris meridian was also a sound choice for scientific reasons: a portion of the quadrant from Dunkirk to Barcelona (about 1000 km, or one-tenth of the total) could be surveyed with start- and end-points at sea level, and that portion was roughly in the middle of the quadrant, where the effects of the Earth's oblateness were expected not to have to be accounted for.

The expedition would take place after the Anglo-French Survey, thus the French meridian arc, which would extend northwards across the United Kingdom, would also extend southwards to Barcelona, later to Balearic Islands. Jean-Baptiste Biot and François Arago would publish in 1821 their observations completing those of Delambre and Mechain. It was an account of the length's variations of portions of one degree of amplitude of the meridian arc along the Paris meridian as well as the account of the variation of the seconds pendulum's length along the same meridian between Shetland and the Balearc Islands.

The task of surveying the meridian arc fell to Pierre Méchain and Jean-Baptiste Delambre, and took more than six years (1792–1798). The technical difficulties were not the only problems the surveyors had to face in the convulsed period of the aftermath of the Revolution: Méchain and Delambre, and later François Arago, were imprisoned several times during their surveys, and Méchain died in 1804 of yellow fever, which he contracted while trying to improve his original results in northern Spain.

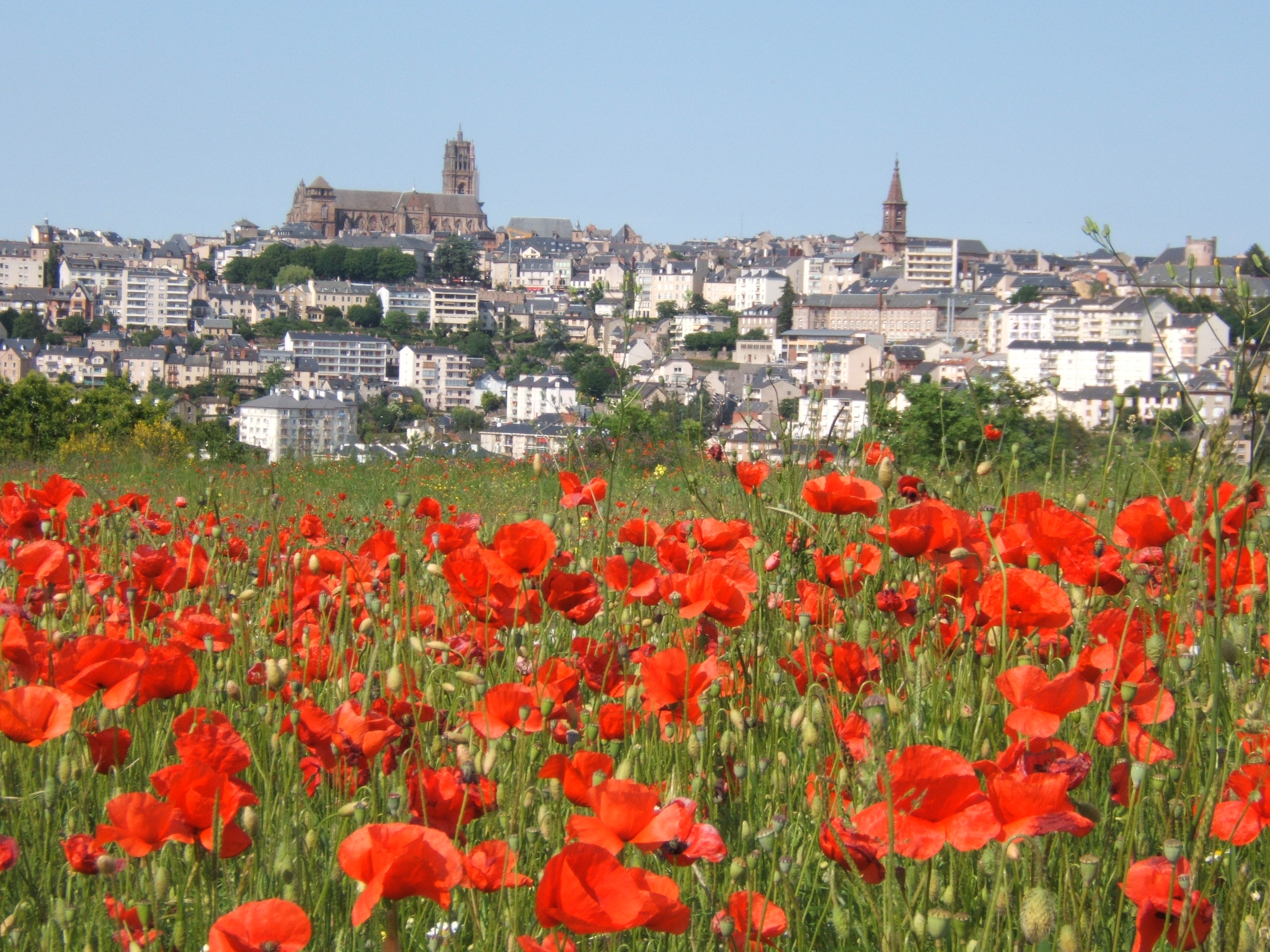
The north and south sections of the meridinal survey met at Rodez Cathedral, seen here dominating the Rodez skyline at left.

The project was split into two parts – the northern section of 742.7 km from the belfry of the Church of Saint-Éloi, Dunkirk to Rodez Cathedral which was surveyed by Delambre and the southern section of 333.0 km from Rodez to the Montjuïc Fortress, Barcelona which was surveyed by Méchain. Although Méchain's sector was half the length of Delambre, it included the Pyrenees and hitherto unsurveyed parts of Spain.

Delambre measured a baseline of about 10 km (6,075.90 toises) in length along a straight road between Melun and Lieusaint. In an operation taking six weeks, the baseline was accurately measured using four platinum rods, each of length two toises (a toise being about 1.949 m). Thereafter he used, where possible, the triangulation points used by Nicolas Louis de Lacaille in his 1739–1740 survey of French meridian arc from Dunkirk to Collioure. Méchain's baseline was of a similar length (6,006.25 toises), and also on a straight section of road between Vernet (in the Perpignan area) and Salces (now Salses-le-Château).

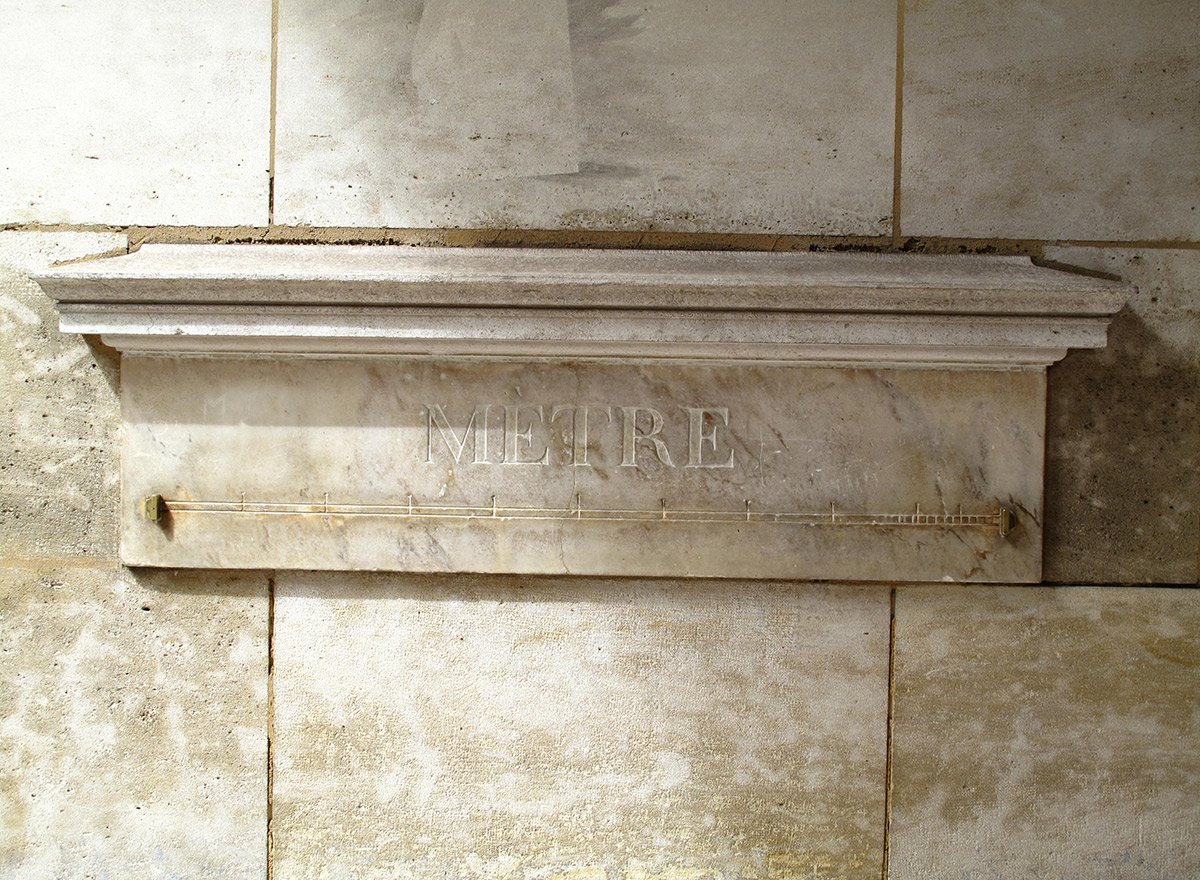
A copy of the "provisional" metre located in the wall of a building, 15 rue de Vaugirard, Paris. These metres were provisional (French: provisoire) because the expedition and the calculations to determine the definitive length of metre were not completed until 1799.

To put into practice the decision taken by the National Convention, on 1 August 1793, to disseminate the new units of the decimal metric system, it was decided to establish the length of the metre based on a fraction of the meridian in the process of being measured. The decision was taken to fix the length of a provisional metre (French: mètre provisoire) determined by the measurement of the Meridian of France from Dunkirk to Collioure, which, in 1740, had been carried out by Nicolas Louis de Lacaille and Cesar-François Cassini de Thury. The length of the metre was established, in relation to the toise of the Academy also called toise of Peru, at 3 feet 11.44 lines, taken at 13 degrees of the temperature scale of René-Antoine Ferchault de Réaumur in use at the time. This value was set by legislation on 7 April 1795. It was therefore metal bars of 443.44 lignes that were distributed in France in 1795-1796. This was the metre installed under the arcades of the rue de Vaugirard, almost opposite the entrance to the Senate.

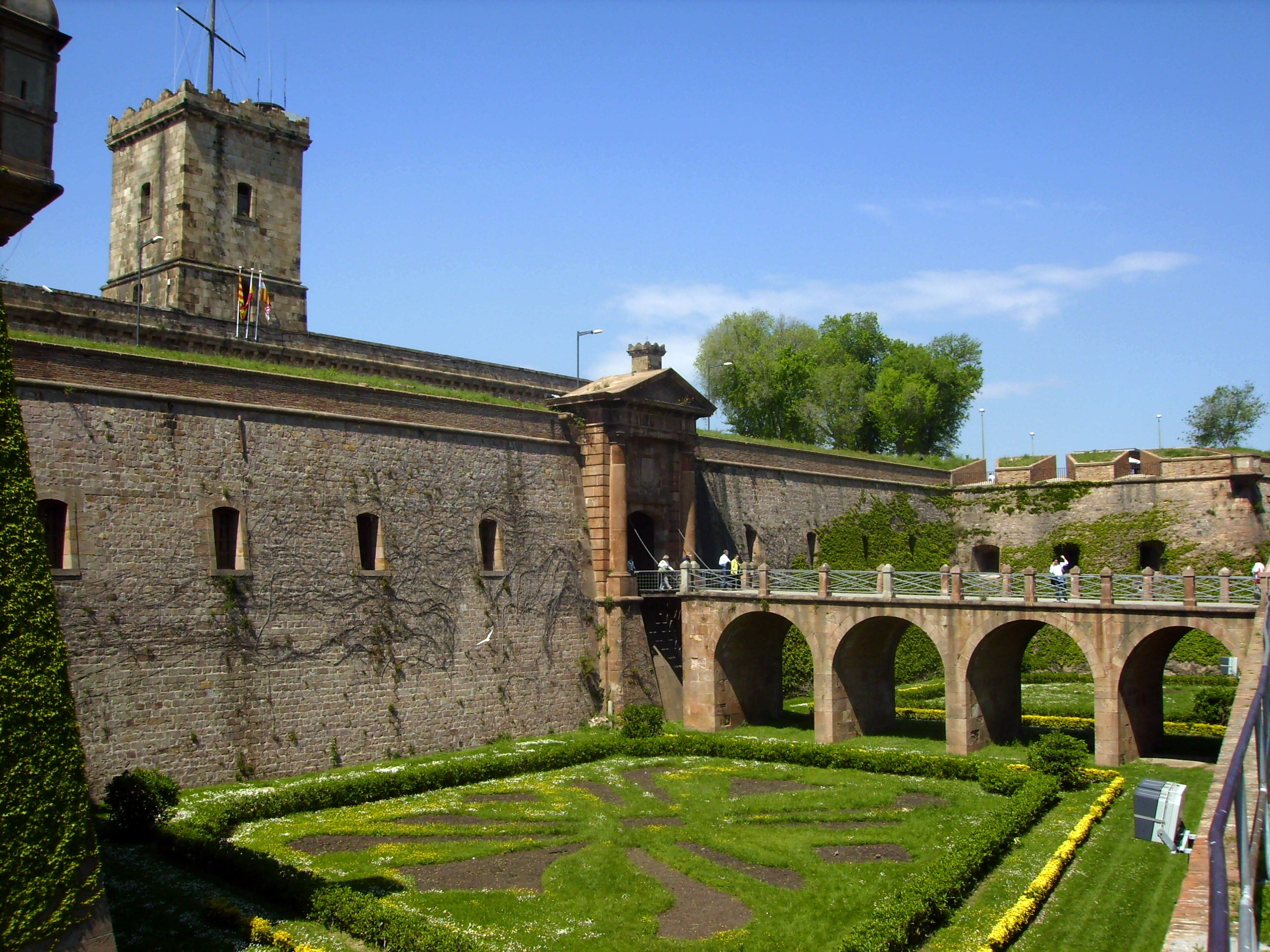
Montjuïc Castle in Barcelona, Spain – the southern end of the meridian arc

End of November 1798, Delambre and Méchain returned to Paris with their data, having completed the survey to meet a foreign commission composed of representatives of Batavian Republic: Henricus Aeneae and Jean Henri van Swinden, Cisalpine Republic: Lorenzo Mascheroni, Kingdom of Denmark: Thomas Bugge, Kingdom of Spain: Gabriel Císcar and Agustín de Pedrayes, Helvetic Republic: Johann Georg Tralles, Ligurian Republic: Ambrogio Multedo, Kingdom of Sardinia: Prospero Balbo, Antonio Vassali Eandi, Roman Republic: Pietro Franchini, Tuscan Republic: Giovanni Fabbroni who had been invited by Talleyrand. The French commission comprised Jean-Charles de Borda, Barnabé Brisson, Charles-Augustin de Coulomb, Jean Darcet, René Just Haüy, Joseph-Louis Lagrange, Pierre- Simon Laplace, Louis Lefèvre-Ginneau, Pierre Méchain and Gaspar de Prony.

In 1799, a commission including Johann Georg Tralles, Jean Henri van Swinden, Adrien-Marie Legendre, Pierre-Simon Laplace, Gabriel Císcar, Pierre Méchain and Jean-Baptiste Delambre calculated the distance from Dunkirk to Barcelona using the data of the triangulation between these two towns and determined the portion of the distance from the North Pole to the Equator it represented. Pierre Méchain's and Jean-Baptiste Delambre's measurements were combined with the results of the French Geodetic Mission to the Equator and a value of 1/334 was found for the Earth's flattening. Pierre-Simon Laplace originally hoped to figure out the Earth ellipsoid problem from the sole measurement of the arc from Dunkirk to Barcelona, but this portion of the meridian arc led for the flattening to the value of 1/150 considered as unacceptable. This value was the result of a conjecture based on too limited data. Another flattening of the Earth was calculated by Delambre, who also excluded the results of the French Geodetic Mission to Lapland and found a value close to 1/300 combining the results of Delambre and Méchain arc measurement with those of the Spanish-French Geodetic Mission taking in account a correction of the astronomic arc. The distance from the North Pole to the Equator was then extrapolated from the measurement of the Paris meridian arc between Dunkirk and Barcelona and was determined as 5130740 toises. As the metre had to be equal to one ten-millionth of this distance, it was defined as 0.513074 toise or 3 feet and 11.296 lines of the Toise of Peru, which had been constructed in 1735 for the French Geodesic Mission to Peru. When the final result was known, a bar whose length was closest to the meridional definition of the metre was selected and placed in the National Archives on 22 June 1799 (4 messidor An VII in the Republican calendar) as a permanent record of the result.

In the 19th century, many astronomers and geodesists were engaged in detailed studies of the Earth's curvature along different meridian arcs. The analyses resulted in a great many model ellipsoids such as Plessis 1817, Airy 1830, Bessel 1841, Everest 1830, and Clarke 1866. A comprehensive list of ellipsoids is given under Earth ellipsoid.

===== The nautical mile =====
Historically a nautical mile was defined as the length of one minute of arc along a meridian of a spherical earth. An ellipsoid model leads to a variation of the nautical mile with latitude. This was resolved by defining the nautical mile to be exactly 1,852 metres. However, for all practical purposes, distances are measured from the latitude scale of charts. As the Royal Yachting Association says in its manual for day skippers: "1 (minute) of Latitude = 1 sea mile", followed by "For most practical purposes distance is measured from the latitude scale, assuming that one minute of latitude equals one nautical mile".

== Calculation ==
On a sphere, the meridian arc length is simply the circular arc length. On an ellipsoid of revolution, for short meridian arcs, their length can be approximated using the Earth's meridional radius of curvature and the circular arc formulation.

$$\delta m\approx (\varphi_2-\varphi_1) \cdot M$$

with the latitude difference in radians.

For longer arcs, the meridian arc length follows from the subtraction of two meridian distances m, the distance from the equator to a point at a latitude φ:

$$\Delta m=m(\varphi_2)-m(\varphi_1)$$

This is an important problem in the theory of map projections, particularly the transverse Mercator projection.

The main ellipsoidal parameters are, a, b, f, but in theoretical work it is useful to define extra parameters, particularly the eccentricity, e, and the third flattening n. Only two of these parameters are independent and there are many relations between them:

$$\begin{align}
f&=\frac{a-b}{a}\,, \qquad  e^2=f(2-f)=\frac{4n}{(1+n)^2}\,, \qquad n=\frac{a-b}{a+b}=\frac{f}{2-f}\,,\\
b&=a(1-f)=a\sqrt{1-e^2}\,, \qquad a+b = a (2-f) = \frac{2a}{1+n}.
\end{align}$$

=== Definition ===
Notation is problematic in this area. The meridian radius of curvature must be distinguished from the meridian distance. The notation M(φ) has been used for both. The definitions adopted here are:

- M(φ) is the meridian radius of curvature.
- m(φ) is the meridian distance.

The meridian radius of curvature can be shown to be equal to:

$$M(\varphi) = \frac{a(1 - e^2)}{\left(1 - e^2 \sin^2 \varphi \right)^\frac32},$$

The arc length of an infinitesimal element of the meridian is dm = M(φ) dφ (with φ in radians). Therefore, the meridian distance from the equator to latitude φ is

$$\begin{align}
m(\varphi) &=\int_0^\varphi M(\varphi) \, d\varphi \\
&= a(1 - e^2)\int_0^\varphi \left(1 - e^2 \sin^2 \varphi \right)^{-\frac32} \, d\varphi\,.
\end{align}$$

The distance formula is simpler when written in terms of the parametric latitude,

$$m(\varphi) = b\int_0^\beta\sqrt{1 + e'^2\sin^2\beta}\,d\beta\,,$$

where tan β = (1 − f)tan φ and e′^{2} = e^{2}/(1 − e^{2}).

Even though latitude is normally confined to the range [−π/2,π/2], all the formulae given here apply to measuring distance around the complete meridian ellipse (including the anti-meridian). Thus the ranges of φ, β, and the rectifying latitude μ, are unrestricted.

=== Relation to elliptic integrals ===
The above integral is related to a special case of an incomplete elliptic integral of the third kind. In the notation of the online NIST handbook (Section 19.2(ii)),

$$m(\varphi)=a\left(1-e^2\right)\,\Pi(\varphi,e^2,e)\,.$$

It may also be written in terms of incomplete elliptic integrals of the second kind (See the NIST handbook Section 19.6(iv)),

$$\begin{align}
m(\varphi) &= a\left(E(\varphi,e)-\frac{e^2\sin\varphi\cos\varphi}{\sqrt{1-e^2\sin{}^{\!2}\varphi}}\right) \\
&= a\left(E(\varphi,e)+\frac{d^2}{d\varphi^2}E(\varphi,e)\right) \\
&= b E(\beta, ie')\,.
\end{align}$$

The calculation (to arbitrary precision) of the elliptic integrals and approximations are also discussed in the NIST handbook. These functions are also implemented in computer algebra programs such as Mathematica and Maxima.

=== Series expansions ===
The above integral may be expressed as an infinite truncated series by expanding the integrand in a Taylor series, performing the resulting integrals term by term, and expressing the result as a trigonometric series. In 1755, Leonhard Euler derived an expansion in the third eccentricity squared.

==== Expansions in the eccentricity (e) ====
Delambre in 1799 derived a widely used expansion on e^{2},

$$m(\varphi)=a(1 - e^2)\left(D_0\varphi+D_2\sin 2\varphi+D_4\sin4\varphi+D_6\sin6\varphi+D_8\sin8\varphi+\cdots\right)\,,$$

where

$$\begin{align}
D_0 &= 1 + \tfrac{3}{4} e^2 + \tfrac{45}{64} e^4 + \tfrac{175}{256} e^6 + \tfrac{11025}{16384} e^8 + \cdots, \\[5mu]
D_2 &= - \tfrac{3}{8} e^2 - \tfrac{15}{32} e^4 - \tfrac{525}{1024} e^6 - \tfrac{2205}{4096} e^8 - \cdots, \\[5mu]
D_4 &= \tfrac{15}{256} e^4 + \tfrac{105}{1024} e^6 + \tfrac{2205}{16384} e^8 + \cdots, \\[5mu]
D_6 &= - \tfrac{35}{3072} e^6 - \tfrac{105}{4096} e^8 - \cdots, \\[5mu]
D_8 &= \tfrac{315}{131072} e^8 + \cdots.
\end{align}$$

Richard Rapp gives a detailed derivation of this result.

==== Expansions in the third flattening (n) ====
Series with considerably faster convergence can be obtained by expanding in terms of the third flattening n instead of the eccentricity.

In 1837, Friedrich Bessel obtained one such series, which was later put into a simpler conjectured form by Helmert and Krüger

$$m(\varphi)=\frac{a+b}{2}\left(H_0\varphi+H_2\sin 2\varphi+H_4\sin4\varphi+H_6\sin6\varphi+H_8\sin8\varphi+\cdots\right)\,,$$

with

$$\begin{align}
H_0 &= 1 + \tfrac{1}{4} n^2 + \tfrac{1}{64} n^4 + \cdots, \\
H_2 &= - \tfrac{3}{2} n + \tfrac{3}{16} n^3 + \cdots,&
H_6 &= - \tfrac{35}{48} n^3 + \cdots, \\
H_4 &= \tfrac{15}{16} n^2 - \tfrac{15}{64} n^4 - \cdots,\qquad&
H_8 &= \tfrac{315}{512} n^4 - \cdots.
\end{align}$$

Because n changes sign when a and b are interchanged, and because the initial factor 1/2(a + b) is constant under this interchange, half the terms in the expansions of H_{2k} vanish.

Even though this results in more slowly converging series compared with $B_{2k}$ shown below, such series are widely used in the specification for the transverse Mercator projection by the National Geospatial-Intelligence Agency and the Ordnance Survey of Great Britain.

==== Series in terms of the parametric latitude ====
In 1825, Bessel derived an expansion of the meridian distance in terms of the parametric latitude β in connection with his work on geodesics,

$$m(\varphi) = \frac{a+b}{2}\left(B_0\beta + B_2\sin2\beta + B_4\sin4\beta + B_6\sin6\beta + B_8\sin8\beta + \cdots\right),$$

with

$$\begin{align}
B_0 &= 1 + \tfrac{1}{4} n^2 + \tfrac{1}{64} n^4 + \cdots = H_0\,,\\
B_2 &= - \tfrac{1}{2} n + \tfrac{1}{16} n^3 + \cdots, &
B_6 &= - \tfrac{1}{48} n^3 + \cdots, \\
B_4 &= - \tfrac{1}{16} n^2 + \tfrac{1}{64} n^4 + \cdots, \qquad&
B_8 &= - \tfrac{5}{512} n^4 + \cdots.
\end{align}$$

Because this series provides an expansion for the elliptic integral of the second kind, it can be used to write the arc length in terms of the geodetic latitude as

$$\begin{align}
m(\varphi) = \frac{a+b}{2}\Biggl(
&B_0\varphi - B_2\sin2\varphi + B_4\sin4\varphi - B_6\sin6\varphi + B_8\sin8\varphi-\cdots \\[-3mu]
&\quad -\frac{2n\sin2\varphi}{\sqrt{1+2n\cos2\varphi+n^2}}\Biggr).
\end{align}$$

==== Generalized series ====
The above series, to eighth order in eccentricity or fourth order in third flattening, provide millimetre accuracy. With the aid of symbolic algebra systems, they can easily be extended to sixth order in the third flattening which provides full double precision accuracy for terrestrial applications.

As described, Delambre and Bessel both wrote their series in a form that allows them to be generalized to arbitrary order. The coefficients in Bessel's series can be expressed particularly simply

$$B_{2k} =
\begin{cases} c_0\,, & \text{if }k = 0\,, \\[5px]
\dfrac{c_k}{k}\,, & \text{if } k > 0\,,
\end{cases}$$

where

$$c_k = \sum_{j=0}^\infty \frac{(2j-3)!!\, (2j+2k-3)!!}{(2j)!!\, (2j+2k)!!} n^{k+2j}$$

and k!! is the double factorial, extended to negative values via the recursion relation: (−1)!! = 1 and (−3)!! = −1.

The coefficients in Helmert's series can similarly be expressed by

$$H_{2k} = (-1)^k (1-2k)(1+2k) B_{2k}\,.$$

This result was conjectured by Friedrich Helmert and proved by Kazushige Kawase. The extra factor (1 − 2k)(1 + 2k) appearing in $H_{2k}$ originates from the additional expansion of $\frac{2n\sin2\varphi}{\sqrt{1+2n\cos2\varphi+n^2}}$ and results in poorer convergence of the series in terms of φ compared to the one in β.

==== Numerical expressions ====
The trigonometric series given above can be conveniently evaluated using Clenshaw summation. This method avoids the calculation of most of the trigonometric functions and allows the series to be summed rapidly and accurately. The technique can also be used to evaluate the difference m(φ_{1}) − m(φ_{2}) while maintaining high relative accuracy.

Substituting the values for the semi-major axis and eccentricity of the WGS 84 ellipsoid gives

$$\begin{align}
m(\varphi)&=\left(111\,132.952\,55\,\varphi^{(\circ)}-16\,038.509\,\sin 2\varphi+16.833\,\sin4\varphi-0.022\,\sin6\varphi+0.000\,03\,\sin8\varphi\right)\mbox{ metres} \\
&= \left(111\,132.952\,55\,\beta^{(\circ)}-5\,346.170\,\sin 2\beta-1.122\,\sin4\beta-0.001\,\sin6\beta-0.5\times10^{-6}\,\sin8\beta\right)\mbox{ metres,}
\end{align}$$

where φ^{(}°^{)} = φ/1° is φ expressed in degrees (and similarly for β^{(}°^{)}).

On the WGS 84 ellipsoid, an approximate expression for the meridian arc distance δm between the two parallels at ±0.5° from the circle at latitude φ is given by

$$\delta m=(111\,133 - 560\cos 2\varphi)\mbox{ metres.}$$

== Quarter meridian ==
A quarter meridian or Earth quadrant.

The distance from the equator to the pole, the quarter meridian (analogous to the quarter-circle), also known as the Earth quadrant, is

$$m_\mathrm{p} = m\left(\frac \pi 2\right)\,.$$

It was part of the historical definition of the metre and of the nautical mile, and used in the definition of the hebdomometre.

The quarter meridian can be expressed in terms of the complete elliptic integral of the second kind,

$$m_\mathrm{p}=aE(e)=bE(ie').$$

where $e, e'$ are the first and second eccentricities.

The quarter meridian is also given by the following generalized series:

$$m_\mathrm{p} = \frac{\pi(a+b)}4 c_0 = \frac{\pi(a+b)}4 \sum_{j=0}^\infty\left(\frac{(2j-3)!!}{(2j)!!}\right)^2 n^{2j}\,,$$

(For the formula of c_{0}, see section #Generalized series above.) This result was first obtained by James Ivory.

The numerical expression for the quarter meridian on the WGS84 ellipsoid is

$$\begin{align}
m_\mathrm{p} &= 0.9983242984312529\ \frac{\pi}{2}\ a\\
&= 10\,001\,965.729\mbox{ m.}
\end{align}$$

=== Full meridian (polar perimeter) ===
The polar Earth's circumference is simply four times quarter meridian:

$$C_p=4m_p$$

The perimeter of a meridian ellipse can also be rewritten in the form of a rectifying circle perimeter, C_{p} = 2πM_{r}. Therefore, the rectifying Earth radius is:

$$M_r=0.5(a+b)/c_0$$

It can be evaluated as 6367449.146 m.

== The inverse meridian problem for the ellipsoid ==
In some problems, we need to be able to solve the inverse problem: given the arc length m, find the latitude φ. This may be solved by Newton's method, iterating

$$\varphi_{i+1} = \varphi_i - \frac{m(\varphi_i) - m}{M(\varphi_i)}\,,$$

until convergence. A suitable starting guess is given by φ_{0} = μ where

$$\mu = \frac{\pi}2 \frac m{m_\mathrm{p}}$$

is the rectifying latitude. Note that it there is no need to differentiate the series for m(φ), since the formula for the meridian radius of curvature M(φ) can be used instead.

Alternatively, Helmert's series for the meridian distance can be reverted to give

$$\varphi = \mu + H'_2\sin2\mu + H'_4\sin4\mu + H'_6\sin6\mu + H'_8\sin8\mu + \cdots$$

where

$$\begin{align}
H'_2 &= \tfrac{3}{2} n - \tfrac{27}{32} n^3 + \cdots,&
H'_6 &= \tfrac{151}{96} n^3 + \cdots, \\
H'_4 &= \tfrac{21}{16} n^2 - \tfrac{55}{32} n^4 + \cdots,\qquad&
H'_8 &= \tfrac{1097}{512} n^4 + \cdots.
\end{align}$$

Similarly, Bessel's series for m in terms of β can be reverted to give

$$\beta = \mu + B'_2\sin2\mu + B'_4\sin4\mu + B'_6\sin6\mu + B'_8\sin8\mu + \cdots,$$

where

$$\begin{align}
B'_2 &= \tfrac{1}{2} n - \tfrac{9}{32} n^3 + \cdots,&
B'_6 &= \tfrac{29}{96} n^3 - \cdots, \\
B'_4 &= \tfrac{5}{16} n^2 - \tfrac{37}{96} n^4 + \cdots,\qquad&
B'_8 &= \tfrac{539}{1536} n^4 - \cdots.
\end{align}$$

Adrien-Marie Legendre showed that the distance along a geodesic on a spheroid is the same as the distance along the perimeter of an ellipse. For this reason, the expression for m in terms of β and its inverse given above play a key role in the solution of the geodesic problem with m replaced by s, the distance along the geodesic, and β replaced by σ, the arc length on the auxiliary sphere. The requisite series extended to sixth order are given by Charles Karney, Eqs. (17) & (21), with ε playing the role of n and τ playing the role of μ.

== See also ==
- History of geodesy
- Geodesy
- Reference ellipsoid
- Paris meridian (West Europe-Africa Meridian-arc)
- French Geodesic Mission to Lapland
- French Geodesic Mission
- Struve Geodetic Arc
- Rectifying latitude
- Geodesics on an ellipsoid
