= Toise =

Former unit of length

A toise (French pronunciation: [twaz]; symbol: T) is a unit of measure for length, area and volume originating in pre-revolutionary France. In North America, it was used in colonial French establishments in early New France, French Louisiana (Louisiane), Acadia (Acadie) and Quebec. The related toesa (Portuguese pronunciation: [tuˈezɐ]) was used in Portugal, Brazil, and other parts of the Portuguese Empire until the adoption of the metric system.

The name is derived from the Latin tensa brachia, meaning "outstretched arms".

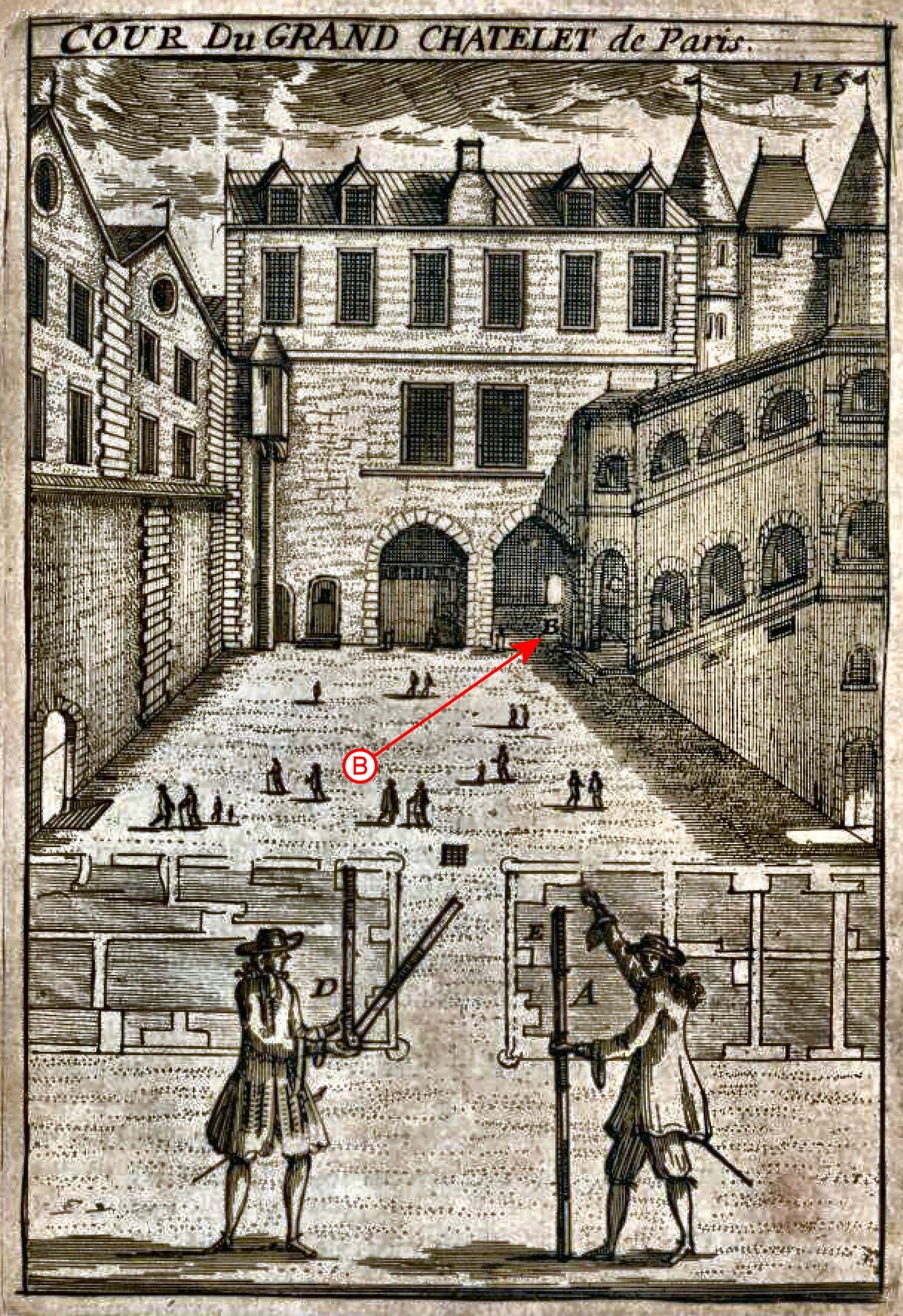
In this illustration from 1702, "B" marks the place outside the Grand Châtelet in Paris where the standard toise was displayed. "A" shows a straight toise ruler, "D" a folding one.

== Definition ==
=== Unit of length ===
- 1 toise was divided in 6 feet (French: pieds) or 72 inches (pouces) or 864 lines (lignes) in France until 1812. In 1799 the metre was defined to be exactly 443.296 lignes or 13,853/27,000 toise, with the intention that the metre should equal 1/10,000,000 of the distance from the North Pole to the equator along a great circle. This had the effect of making the toise approximately 1949.03631 mm. According to an article written in 1866, during measurement of various standard length artefacts from several countries, the toise was measured as 1949.03632 mm. Since before 1394, the standard for the toise of Paris was an iron bar embedded in the wall of the Grand Châtelet. But a little before 1667 the pillar in which the standard was embedded bent and distorted the standard. In 1667 officials constructed a new standard, but there were complaints that the new standard was about 0.5% shorter than the previous one. Nevertheless, the new standard was mandated. The old standard was then called "toise de l'Écritoire". From 1668 to 1776 the French standard of length was the Toise of Châtelet, which was fixed outside the Grand Châtelet in Paris. In 1735 two geodetic standards were calibrated against the Toise of Châtelet. One of them, the Toise of Peru, was used for the Spanish-French Geodesic Mission. In 1766 the Toise of Peru became the official standard of length in France and was renamed Toise of the Academy (Toise de l'Académie). In 1799, after the remeasurement of the Paris meridian arc (Méridienne de France) between Dunkirk and Barcelona by Delambre and Mechain, the metre was defined as 3 pieds (feet) and 11.296 lignes (lines) of the Toise of the Academy.
- 1 toise was exactly 2 metres in France between 1812 and 1 January 1840 (mesures usuelles).
- 1 toise = 1.8 metres in Switzerland.
- 1 toesa = 6 feet (Portuguese: pés) = 1.98 m in Portugal.

=== Unit of area ===
- 1 toise was about 3.799 square metres, or a square French toise, as a measure for land and masonry area in France before 10 December 1799.

=== Unit of volume ===
- 1 toise = 8.0 cubic metres (20th century Haiti)

== See also ==
- Units of measurement in France before the French Revolution
- Portuguese customary units
- Ottoman units of measurement
- Fathom and klafter, similar units
