= French Geodesic Mission to the Equator =

18th-century expedition to present-day Ecuador

The Spanish-French Geodesic Mission (French: Expédition géodésique française en Équateur), also called the French Geodesic Mission to Peru, was an 18th-century expedition to what is now Ecuador carried out for the purpose of performing an arc measurement, measuring the length of a degree of latitude near the Equator, by which the Earth's radius can be inferred. The mission was one of the first geodesic (or geodetic) missions carried out under modern scientific principles, and the first major international scientific expedition.

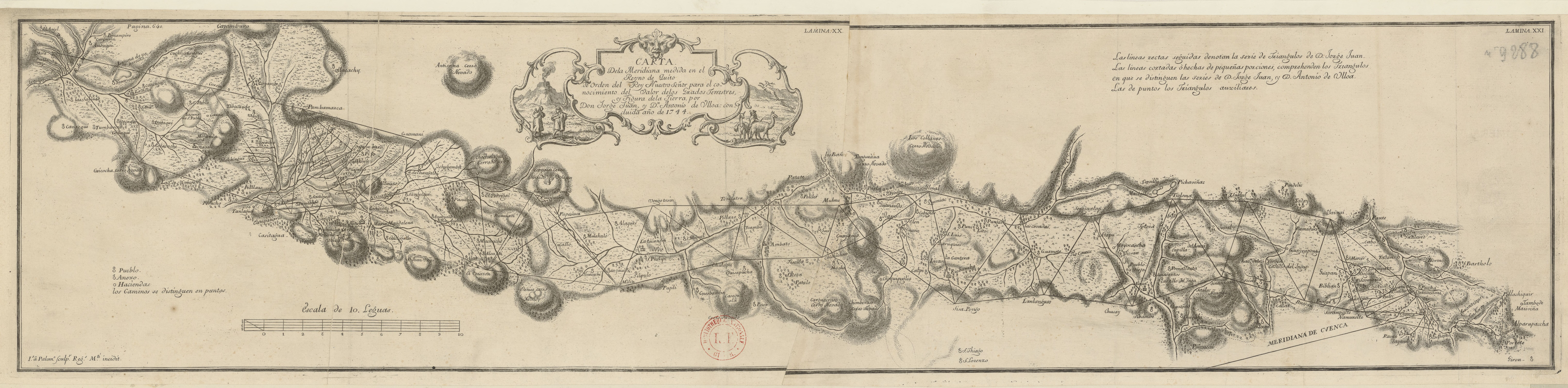
Map of the meridian by Jorge Juan and Antonio de Ulloa, showing triangulation across mountains in the Andes near the equator.

== Background ==
In the 18th century, there was significant debate in the scientific community, specifically in the French Academy of Sciences (Académie des sciences), as to whether the circumference of the Earth was greater around the Equator or around the poles. French astronomer Jacques Cassini held to the view that the polar circumference was greater. King Louis XV and the academy sent two expeditions to determine the answer: a northern expedition was sent to the Torne Valley in Lapland, close to the Arctic Circle, with the Swedish physicist Anders Celsius and under the guidance of the French mathematician Pierre Louis Maupertuis. The other mission was sent to Ecuador, at the Equator. Previous accurate measurements had been taken in Paris by Cassini and others.

== Expedition ==
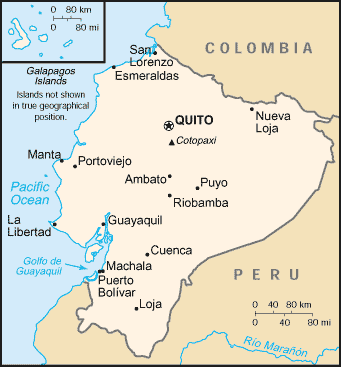
Ecuador

The equatorial mission was led by French astronomers Charles Marie de La Condamine, Pierre Bouguer, Louis Godin and Spanish geographers Jorge Juan and Antonio de Ulloa. They were accompanied by several assistants, including the naturalist Joseph de Jussieu and Louis's cousin Jean Godin. La Condamine was joined in his journey down the Amazon by Ecuadoran geographer and topographer Pedro Maldonado. (Maldonado later traveled to Europe to continue his scientific work.)

The Ecuadoran expedition (Note: In the 18th century, the nation of Ecuador did not yet exist. The area was under Spanish control and was called the Territory of Quito after the city of Quito. The fame brought to the region by the French Geodesic Mission influenced the adoption of the name Republic of Ecuador when the country gained independence in 1830. This national name refers to the Earth's equator passing very close to the city of Quito, and which crosses the country from east to west. The first reference of the country on the equator was registered in Noticias Secretas de América, which referred to the lands of Ecuador as the jurisdiction of the Real Audiencia de Quito. Delegates from Guayaquil and Cuenca in the First Constituent Assembly suggested the name "Republic of Quito" which was initially scrapped, although the Spanish colony throughout the territory was known simply as Quito.) left France in May 1735. They landed on the Caribbean coast in Colombia, sailed to Panama where they traveled overland to the Pacific, and continued by sail to Ecuador, then called the Territory of Quito by Spain. In Ecuador, they split into two groups, traveling overland through rain forests, arriving in Quito in June 1736.

Pierre Bouguer established the length of a pendulum beating seconds on the Equator at Quito, near Quito at the top of Pinchincha, and at sea level to determine gravity of Earth. La Condamine had a marble plaque prepared, with a bronze exemplar (varilla metalica) of the length of such a pendulum set into it, which he presented to the Jesuit College of San Francisco in Quito in 1742, engraved with an inscription reading: Penduli simplicis aequinoctialis, unius minuti secundi temporis medii, in altitudine Soli Quitensis, archetypus (mensurae naturalis exemplar, utinam et universalis) ["Archetype of the equinoctial simple pendulum, of one second of a minute of mean time at the latitude of Quito (a natural and, may it be, a universal model of measure)"]. The plaque is now in the Observatorio Astronómico in the Parque La Alameda.

Bouguer, La Condamine, Godin and their colleagues measured arcs of the Earth's curvature on the Equator from the plains near Quito to the southern city of Cuenca. These measurements enabled the first accurate determination of the shape of the Earth, eventually leading to the establishment of the international metric system of measurement. When an International Commission for Weights and Measures was convened in Paris to settle the true length of the metre, it adopted on 22 June 1799 a standard metre based on the length of the half meridian connecting the North Pole with the Equator. The French Academy of Sciences had commissioned an expedition led by Jean Baptiste Joseph Delambre and Pierre Méchain, lasting from 1792 to 1799, which attempted to accurately measure the distance between a belfry in Dunkerque and Montjuïc castle in Barcelona at the longitude of Paris Panthéon. This portion of the Paris meridian was to serve as the basis for the length of the half meridian connecting the North Pole with the Equator. The metre was defined as the ten-millionth of the half meridian's length extrapolated from an Earth's flattening of 1/334 obtained from the results of the survey by Delambre and Méchain combined with those of the Peru meridian arc as established by La Condamine and his colleagues.

They completed their survey measurements by 1739, measuring the length of a meridian arc of three degrees at the Equator. They did this in spite of earlier news that the expedition to Lapland led by Maupertuis had already finished their work and had proven that the Earth is oblate; i.e., flattened at the poles. However, problems with astronomical observations kept them in Ecuador several more years.

Bouguer returned first from the expedition, going overland to the Caribbean and then to France. La Condamine, along with Maldonado, returned by way of the Amazon River. Louis Godin took a position as professor in Lima, where he helped rebuild the city after the devastating 1746 earthquake, and returned to Europe in 1751. Bouguer, La Condamine and the Spanish officers each wrote separate accounts of the expedition, which opened up European eyes to the exotic landscapes, flora and fauna of South America and led directly to the great naturalist expeditions by Alexander von Humboldt and others.

La Condamine tried in vain to promote the length of the seconds pendulum measured at the Equator as a universal measure of length. He was more successful with his proposal to adopt the geodetic standard used in Peru as the official standard of the toise of Paris. The toise of Peru became the royal standard of the toise in 1766 under the name Toise de l'Académie.

== Observations during the mission ==
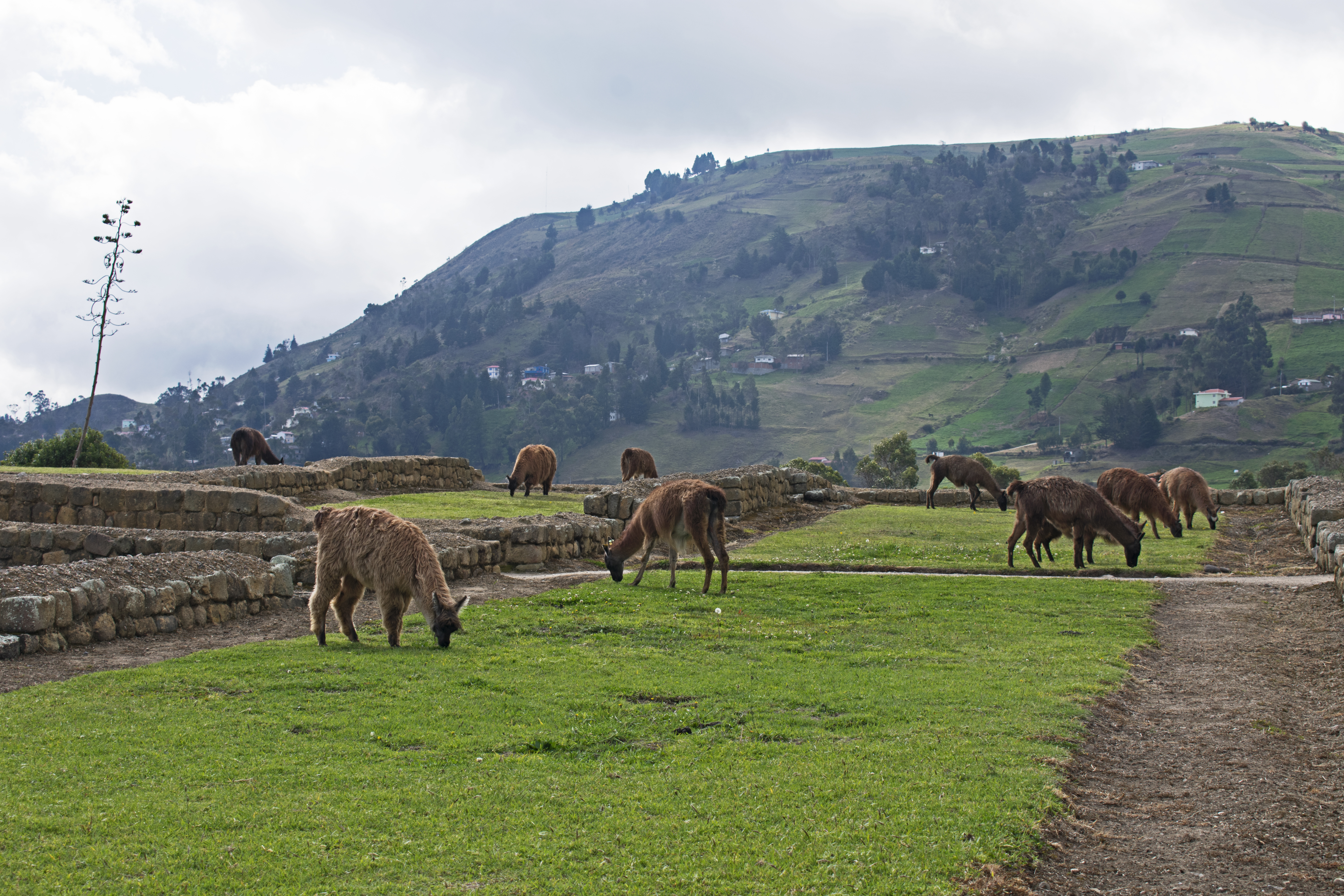
Part of the ruins of Ingapirca is currently known as La Condamine.

- Ulloa and Juan visited the architectural Inca complex in San Agustin de Callo and subsequently wrote a descriptive document of what they observed at the ruins. Ulloa made a drawing of the ruins.
- In 1739, Charles Marie de La Condamine became the first European to make a scientific description of Ingapirca.
- The scientists witnessed two eruptions of the Cotopaxi volcano in 1743 and 1744.
- Expedition members, through talking to local inhabitants, became the first Europeans to discover and scientifically document rubber tapping (and thus rubber), and identify the correct type of cinchona tree that produces the active form of quinine (an important anti-malarial agent).
- Charles Marie de La Condamine developed the concept of the metre as a universal unit of measure based on the dimensions of the Earth (rather than local standards that differed and hindered trade).

== Subsequent mission ==
In the late 19th century, the Academy of Sciences sent another mission to Ecuador at the behest of the International Association of Geodesy to confirm the results of the First Geodesic Mission and commemorate the relationship between the two republics. This second mission was led by Captain E. Maurain and several other military personnel during its tenure in Ecuador from 1901 to 1906. The only two members of the French mission to spend the entire time in Ecuador were Lieutenant (later General) Georges Perrier and medical officer Paul Rivet, later an important anthropologist and founder of the Musée de l'Homme in Paris.

== Monument ==
A reproduction of the pyramids that marked the baseline for measurement at Yaruqui (which was destroyed by Quito authorities in the 1740s) was erected in 1836, the centennial of the expedition, by the Rocafuerte administration of the nascent republic of Ecuador. This monument fell into disrepair over the next century but was rebuilt in 1936, minus its original French inscription, for the bicentennial of the first geodesic expedition, along with a second pyramid at San Antonio de Pichincha on the Equator. These monuments still exist today. The new Quito International Airport opened in the Yaruqui Valley. Though talks of having a mural celebrating the Geodesic Mission took place during planning stages, no acknowledgement of the scientific importance of this site currently exists.

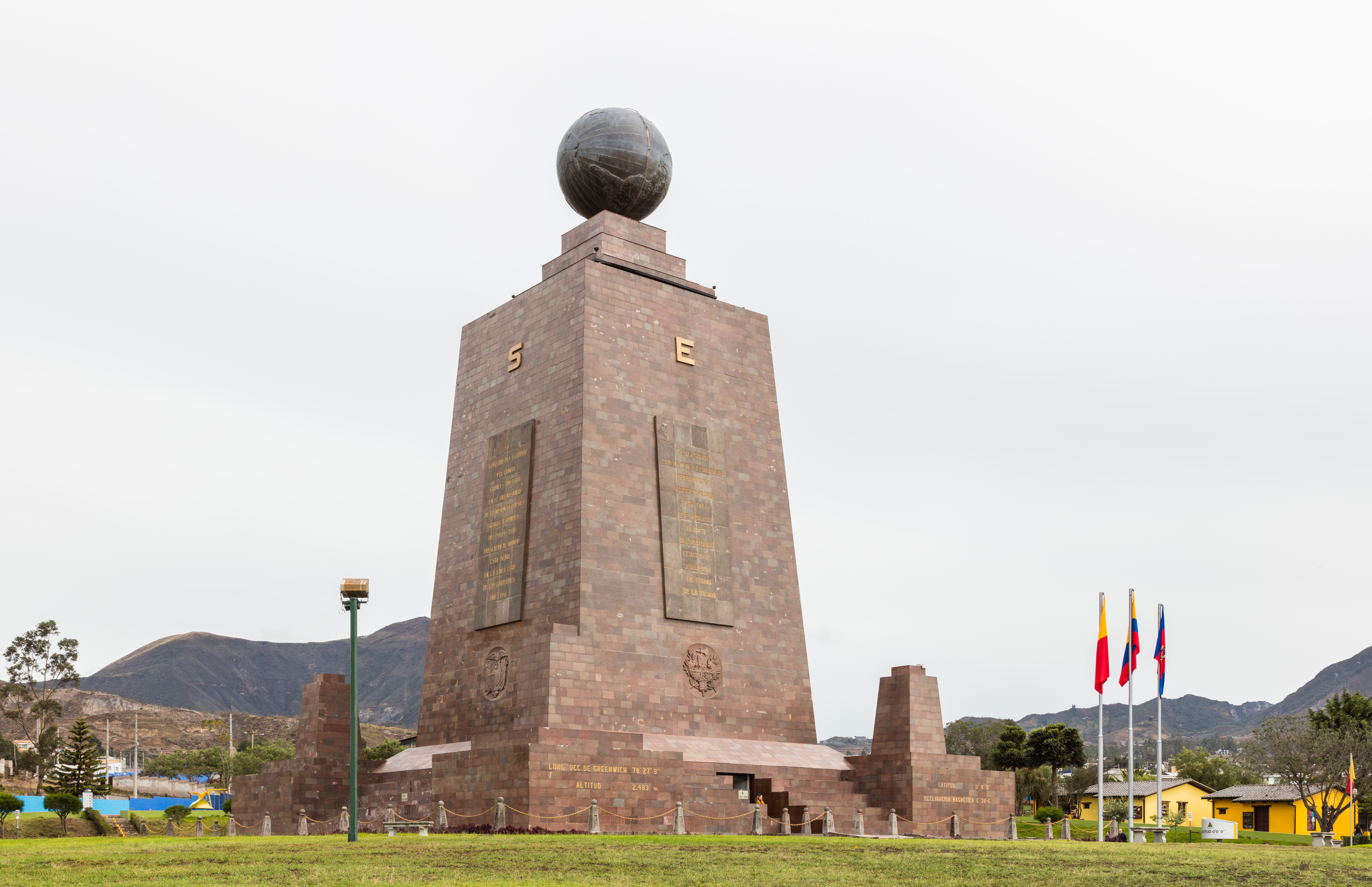
Monument at Ciudad Mitad del Mundo.

In 1936, the French American Committee of Ecuador sponsored the idea of the Ecuadoran geographer Dr. Luis Tufiño and raised a monument commemorating the bicentennial of the arrival of the First Geodesic Mission. They raised a 10-meter-high monument at Ciudad Mitad del Mundo in San Antonio de Pichincha, in Pichincha Province of Ecuador. However, there is no record that the Mission ever visited the area.

There was a project to build a new pyramid exactly on the Equator, to be designed by the famed architect Rafael Viñoly (d. 2023).

== Publications ==
- Relación histórica del viaje a la América meridional, Jorge Juan and Ulloa, 1748
- Figure de la terre determine, Bouguer, 1749
- Mesure des trois premiers degrés du méridien dans l'hémisphère austral, La Condamine, 1751
- Journal du voyage, La Condamine, 1751
- Le procès des étoiles, 1735–1771, ISBN 978-2-232-10176-2, ISBN 978-2-232-11862-3

== See also ==
- French Geodesic Mission to Lapland
- Geodesy
- History of geodesy
- History of the metre
- Seconds pendulum
- De Lacaille's arc measurement
- Charles Marie de La Condamine#In South America
- Jorge Juan y Santacilia#Sojourn in South America
- Antonio de Ulloa#South American expedition
