= Charles Marie de La Condamine =

French explorer, geographer and mathematician (1701–1774)

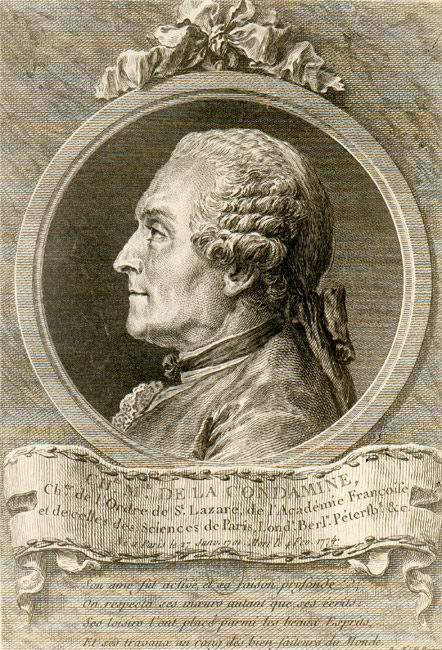
- La Condamine by Charles-Nicolas Cochin (1768) Pierre-Philippe Choffard (1759)
- Born: 28 January 1701; Paris, France
- Died: 4 February 1774 (aged 73); Paris, France

Charles Marie de La Condamine (French: [la kɔ̃damin]; 28 January 1701 – 4 February 1774) was a French explorer, geographer, and mathematician. He spent ten years in territory which is now Ecuador, measuring the length of a degree of latitude at the equator and preparing the first map of the Amazon region based on astro-geodetic observations. Furthermore he was a contributor to the Encyclopédie.

He was a member of the French Royal Academy of Sciences in Paris, the Royal Society of London, and the Prussian Academy of Sciences in Berlin, the Russian Academy of Sciences in Saint Petersburg, the Academy of Sciences of the Institute of Bologna in Bologna, and the academy of Cortona, as well as the Stanislas Academy in Nancy, France.

In 1760, he was elected to the prestigious Académie française, where naturalist, mathematician, and cosmologist Buffon welcomed him.

He also gained prominence as a passionate advocate for smallpox inoculation.

Through his contributions to botany, zoology, and the geography of Ecuador and the Amazon, he is regarded as a forerunner to German polymath Alexander von Humboldt.

== Biography ==
Charles Marie de La Condamine was born in Paris as a son of well-to-do parents, Charles de La Condamine and Louise Marguerite Chourses. He studied at the Collège Louis-le-Grand in Paris, where he was trained in humanities as well as in mathematics. After finishing his studies, he enlisted in the army and fought in the war against Spain (1719). After returning from the war, he became acquainted with scientific circles in Paris. On 12 December 1730 he became a member of the Académie des Sciences and was appointed Assistant Chemist at the Academy.

In 1729 La Condamine and his friend Voltaire exploited a loophole in the French government’s lottery, which brought them large profits.

In May 1731 La Condamine sailed with the Levant Company to Constantinople (now Istanbul), where he stayed five months. After returning to Paris, La Condamine submitted in November 1732 a paper to the Academy entitled Mathematical and Physical Observations made during a Visit of the Levant in 1731 and 1732.

=== In South America ===
Three years later he joined the French Geodesic Mission to territory which is now Ecuador, which had the aim of testing a hypothesis of Isaac Newton. Newton had posited that the Earth is not a perfect sphere, but bulges around the equator and is flattened at the poles. Newton's opinion had raised a huge controversy among French scientists. Pierre Louis Maupertuis, Alexis Claude Clairaut, and Pierre Charles Le Monnier traveled to Lapland, where they were to measure the length of several degrees of latitude orthogonal to the Arctic Circle, while Louis Godin, Pierre Bouguer, and La Condamine were sent to South America to perform similar measurements around the equator.

On 16 May 1735, La Condamine sailed from La Rochelle accompanied by Godin, Bouguer and a botanist, Joseph de Jussieu. After stopovers in Martinique, Saint-Domingue, and Cartagena, they sailed southward through Panama, arriving at the Pacific port of Manta on 10 March 1736.

La Condamine's associations with his colleagues were unhappy. The expedition was beset by many difficulties, and finally La Condamine split from the rest and made his way to Quito, Ecuador separately, following the Esmeraldas River, becoming the first European to encounter rubber in the process. La Condamine is credited with introducing samples of rubber to the Académie Royale des Sciences of France in 1736. In 1751, he presented a paper by François Fresneau to the Académie (eventually published in 1755) which described many of the properties of rubber. This has been referred to as the first scientific paper on rubber. He joined the group again on 4 June 1736 in the city of Quito.

The meridian arc whose length La Condamine and his colleagues chose to measure passed through a high valley perpendicular to the equator, stretching from Quito (now the capital of Ecuador) in the north to Cuenca in the south. The scientists spent a month performing triangulation measurements in the Yaruqui plains—from 3 October to 3 November 1736—and then returned to Quito.

After they had come back to Quito, they found that subsidies expected from Paris had not arrived. La Condamine, who had taken precautions and had made a deposit on a bank in Lima, traveled in early 1737 to Lima to collect money. He prolonged this journey somewhat to study the cinchona tree with its medicinally active bark (containing the anti-malarial drug quinine), the tree being hardly known in Europe. Because cinchona only grows at high altitudes the plants did not survive. He described how the plants were brought to France:

On June 3rd I spent the whole day on one of these mountains [near Loja in present-day Ecuador]. Though assisted by two Americans of the region whom I took with me as guides, I was able to collect no more than eight or nine young plants of Quinquina [cinchona] in a proper state for transportation. These I had placed in earth taken from the spot in a case of suitable size and had them carried on the shoulders of a man whom I kept constantly in my sight, and then by canoe. I hoped to leave some of the plants at Cayenne [in Guiana] for cultivation and to transport the others to the King's garden in France.

He collected valuable seeds, sarsparilla, guaiacum, ipecacuanha, cacao, vanilla and simarouba.

After returning to Quito on June 20, 1737, he found that Godin refused to disclose his results. Whereupon, La Condamine joined forces with Bouguer. The two men continued with their length measurements in the mountainous and inaccessible region close to Quito. When, in December 1741, Bouguer detected an error in a calculation of La Condamine's, the two explorers got into a quarrel and stopped speaking to each other. However, working separately, the two completed their project in May 1743.

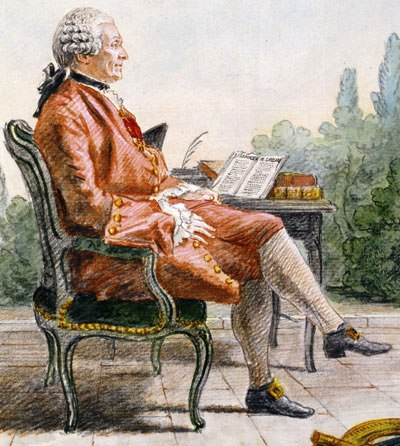
La Condamine (Carmontelle 1760)

=== Return to Europe ===
Insufficient funds prevented La Condamine from returning to France directly. Thus La Condamine chose to return by way of the Amazon River, a route which is longer and more dangerous. His was the first scientific exploration of the Amazon. He reached the Atlantic Ocean on 19 September 1743, having made observations of astronomic and topographic interest on the way. He also made some botanical studies, notably of cinchona and rubber trees.

In February 1744 he arrived in Cayenne, the capital of French Guiana. He did not dare to travel back to France on a French merchant ship because France was at war (the Austrian Succession War of 1740–1748), and he had to wait for five months for a Dutch ship, but made good use of his waiting time by observing and recording physical, biological and ethnological phenomena. Finally leaving Cayenne in August 1744, he arrived in Amsterdam on 30 November 1744, where he stayed for a while, and arrived in Paris in February 1745. He brought with him many notes, natural history specimens, and art objects that he donated to the naturalist Buffon (1707–1788).

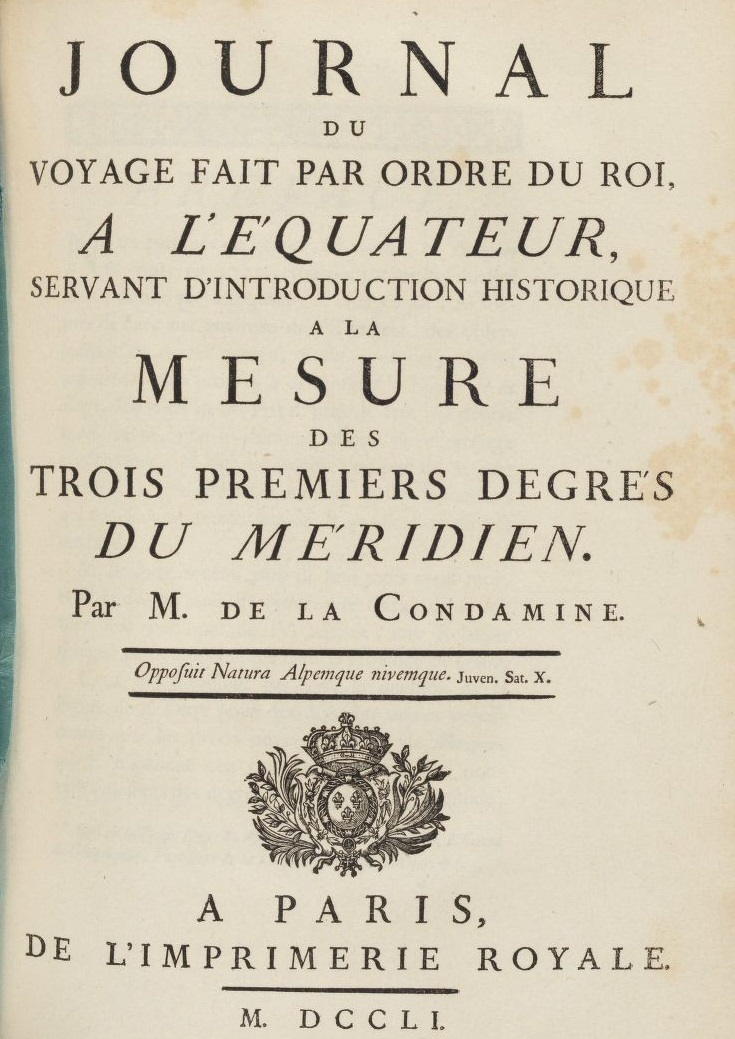
Journal du voyage fait par ordre du roi, a l'équateur, 1751

La Condamine published the results of his measurements and travels with a map of the Amazon in Mém. de l'Académie des Sciences, 1745 (English translation 1745–1747). This included the first descriptions by a European of the Casiquiare River and the curare arrow poison prepared by the Amerindians. He also noted the correct use of quinine to fight malaria. The journal of his ten-year-long voyage to South America was published in Paris in 1751. The scientific results of the expedition were unambiguous: the Earth is indeed a spheroid flattened at the poles as was believed by Newton.

La Condamine and Bouguer failed to write a joint publication, and Bouguer's death in 1758 put an end to their relationship. The other expedition member, Godin, died in 1760. Being the only surviving member, he received most of the credit for the expedition which drew a great deal of attention in France, as he was a gifted writer and popularizer.

On a visit to Rome La Condamine made careful measurements of the ancient buildings with a view to a precise determination of the length of the Roman foot. He also wrote in favour of inoculation, and on various other subjects, mainly connected with his work in South America.

La Condamine had contracted smallpox in his youth. This led him to take part in the debate on variolation against the disease and to propagate inoculation against smallpox. Assisted by the clarity and elegance of his writing, he presented several papers at the Academy of Sciences in which he defended his ideas with passion. He became a corresponding member of the academies of London, Berlin, Saint Petersburg and Bologna, and was elected to the l'Académie française on 29 November 1760. In August 1756, he married, with papal dispensation, his young niece Charlotte Bouzier of Estouilly. La Condamine had many friends, the closest one being Maupertuis, to whom he bequeathed his papers. La Condamine died in Paris on 4 February 1774, following a hernia operation.

== Works ==
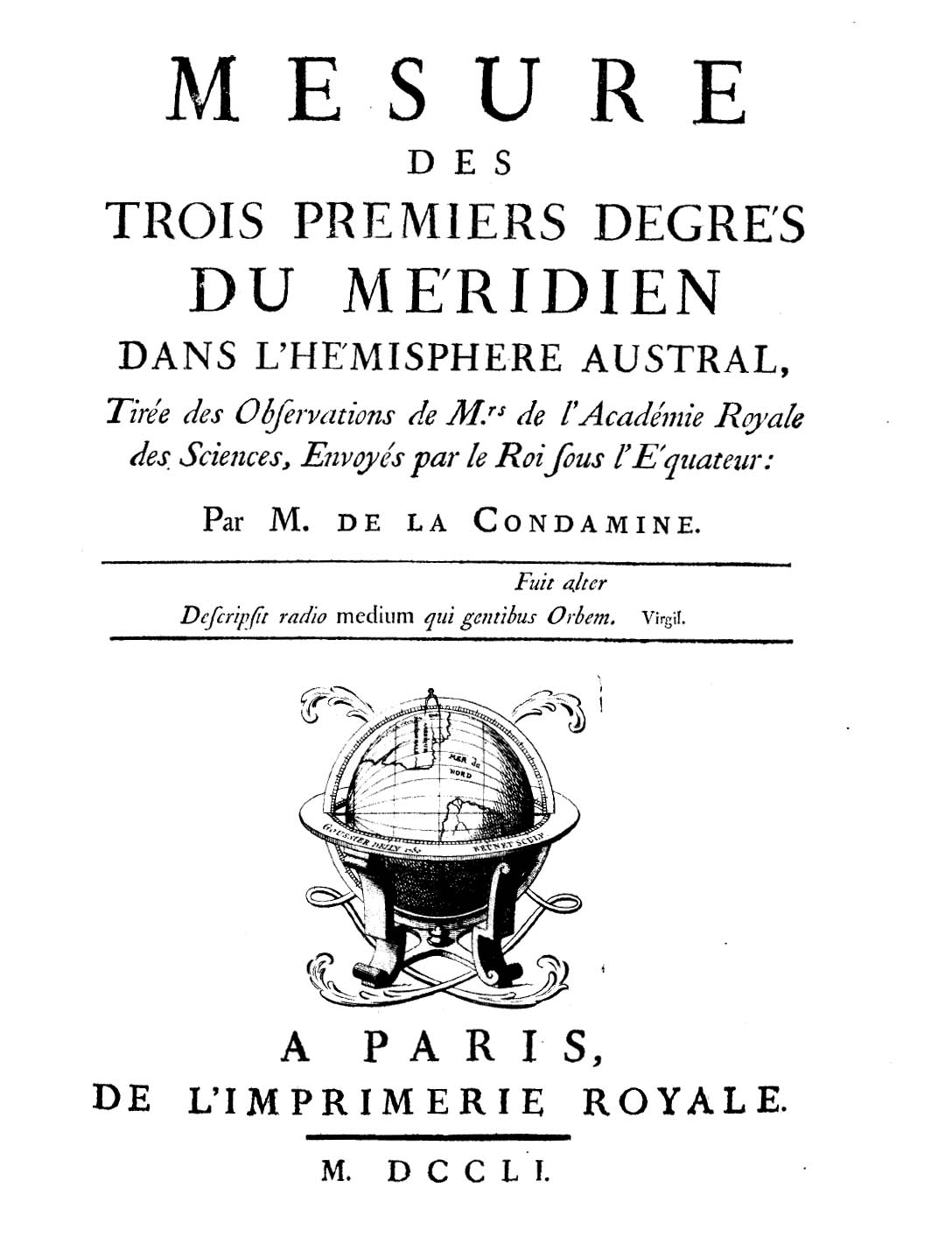
Mesure des trois premiers degrés du méridien dans l'hémisphere austral, 1751

=== South America ===
- Journal du voyage fait par ordre du roi à l'équateur (Paris 1751, Supplement 1752)
- Relation abrégée d'un voyage fait dans l'intérieur del'Amérique méridionale (Paris 1759)
- "Mémoire sur quelques anciens monumens du Perou [sic], du tems des Incas", in: Histoire de l'Académie Royale des Sciences et Belles Lettres II (1746), Berlin 1748, S. 435–456 (PDF).

=== Others ===
- La figure de la terre déterminée (Paris 1749)
- Mesure des trois premiers degrés du méridien dans l'hémisphère australe (Paris 1751)
- Histoire de l'inoculation de la petite vérole (Amsterdam 1773)
