= French Geodesic Mission to Lapland =

1736–7 scientific expedition

Tornio Church. Drawing by Outhier.

The French Geodesic Mission to Lapland was one of the two geodesic missions carried out in 1736–1737 by the French Academy of Sciences for measuring the shape of the Earth. One expedition was sent to Ecuador to perform measurements near the Equator; the other was sent to Torne Valley to perform measurements near the Arctic Circle.

The expedition to Torne Valley was led by Pierre Louis Maupertuis. As Swedish representative, professor Anders Celsius joined the team. The expedition arrived in Tornio on June 19, 1736, spent the rest of 1736 making measurements, and returned to France on June 10, 1737. By measuring the length of the arc, Maupertuis's team was able to prove that the Earth is, indeed, flattened at the poles as Sir Isaac Newton had predicted.

The books describing this trip, written by Maupertuis and Réginald Outhier, have given us much information about the nature and culture of 18th-century Lapland, and the books have inspired many travellers to head to Torne Valley.

== Results ==
The team measured the length of a meridian arc of approximately one degree's length – about 111 km. The south end of the arc was at the tower of the church of Tornio (Torneå), the north end was at the hill of Kittisvaara.

After arriving in Tornio in summer, the team moved north along the Torne Valley, making precise angle measurements between reference points to lay down a system of triangulations. They also performed astronomical observations to determine their latitude. After reaching Kittisvaara, they turned back and reached Tornio in winter. They then laid out a 8.4-mile baseline and used wooden rods to measure its length to an accuracy of 4 inches.

After analyzing their data, they found that the length of 1 degree of latitude to be 57,422 toise in Lapland. The other expedition to Ecuador found it to be 56,734 toise in Ecuador. Jean Picard had surveyed the Paris-Amiens region in 1669, finding a figure of 57,060 toise. Together, these figures showed the shape of the Earth to be oblate.

Thus, Sir, You See the Earth is Oblate, according to the Actual Measurements, as it has been already found by the Law of Staticks: and this flatness appears even more considerable than Sir Isaac Newton thought it. Maupertuis' Letter to James Bradley, third Astronomer Royal of Great Britain.

Later, Euler used figures from these expeditions, as well as later data, to compute the shape of the Earth.

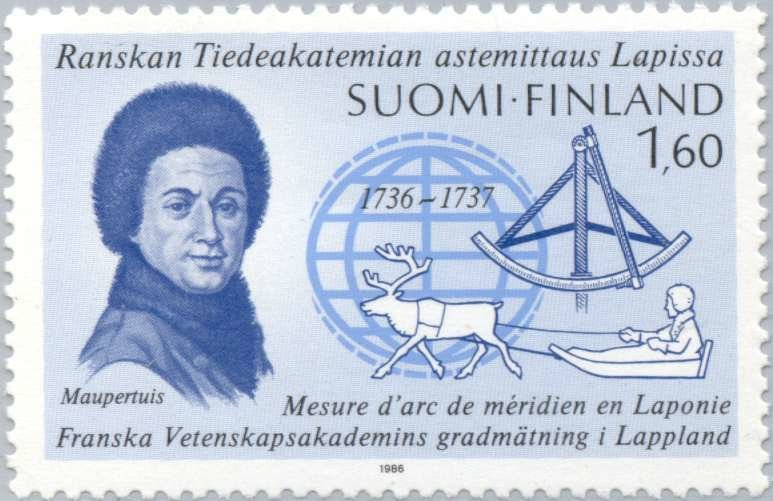
Commemorating stamp.
