= Anglo-French Survey (1784–1790) =

Survey of the distance between Greenwich and Paris

The Anglo-French Survey (1784–1790) was the geodetic survey to measure the relative position of the Royal Greenwich Observatory and the Paris Observatory via triangulation. The English operations, executed by the Scottish military surveyor William Roy, consisted of the measurements of bases at Hounslow Heath (1784) and Romney Marsh (1787), the measurements of the angles of the triangles (1787–1788), and finally the calculation of all the triangles (1788–1790). The survey is very significant as the first precise survey within Britain, and the forerunner of the work of the Ordnance Survey which was founded in 1791, one year after Roy's death.

== Cassini's memoir ==
Late in life, when he was 57, Roy was granted the opportunity to establish his lasting reputation in the world of geodesy. The opening came from a completely unexpected direction. In 1783 the director of the Paris Observatory, Cassini de Thury, addressed a memoir to the Royal Society in London, in which he expressed grave reservations about the latitude and longitude measurements undertaken at the Royal Greenwich Observatory. He suggested that the correct values might be found by combining the Paris Observatory figures with a precise trigonometric survey between the two observatories. (The French surveys had already been carried out in the course of the preparation of the map of France.) This criticism was roundly rejected by the English Astronomer Royal Nevil Maskelyne, who was convinced of the accuracy of the Greenwich measurements but, at the same time, he realised that Cassini's memoir provided a means of promoting government funding for a survey which would be valuable in its own right. Approval was granted and Sir Joseph Banks, president of the Royal Society, proposed that Roy should lead the project. Roy gladly accepted and set matters in motion by submitting to the Crown a grossly underestimated budget for manpower (by far the largest element) and new precision instruments to be constructed by Jesse Ramsden. The whole project is described in Roy's three large articles in the Philosophical Transactions of the Royal Society of London in 1785, 1787 and 1790. There are shorter accounts of the project in the History of the Royal Engineers by Porter and in every history of the Ordnance Survey, particularly the book by Seymour and also that by Owen and Pilbeam.

== The Hounslow Heath base, 1784 ==
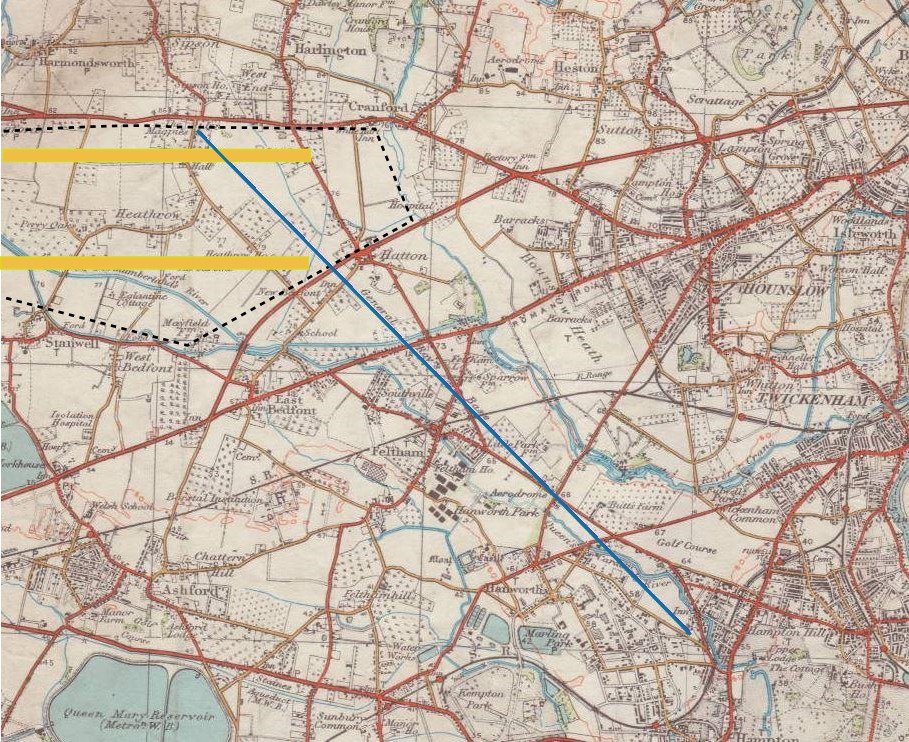
The Hounslow Heath baseline (in blue) and Heathrow Airport's perimeter (dotted) and 2 main runways (in yellow) superimposed on an Ordnance Survey map of 1935

The first task of any survey is to establish a baseline and, after a search by Roy and three other members of the Royal Society on 16 April, they fixed upon the heart of what was mainly still common land, the western swathe of Hounslow Heath. This was a near-uniform descent from 83–57 feet (25–17 m) AOD between King's Arbour (memorialised by a replica cannon outside of the Northern Perimeter Road of Heathrow Airport) and a point in the fields of Hampton Poor-house, five miles and one thousand feet to the south-east. The direction was first chosen to suit the lie of the land, but it was seen to almost coincide with the telescopic view toward the steeple of All Saints' Church in Banstead, about 12 miles away, and it was therefore made to coincide exactly with that direction: it is shown as a blue line on the map above.

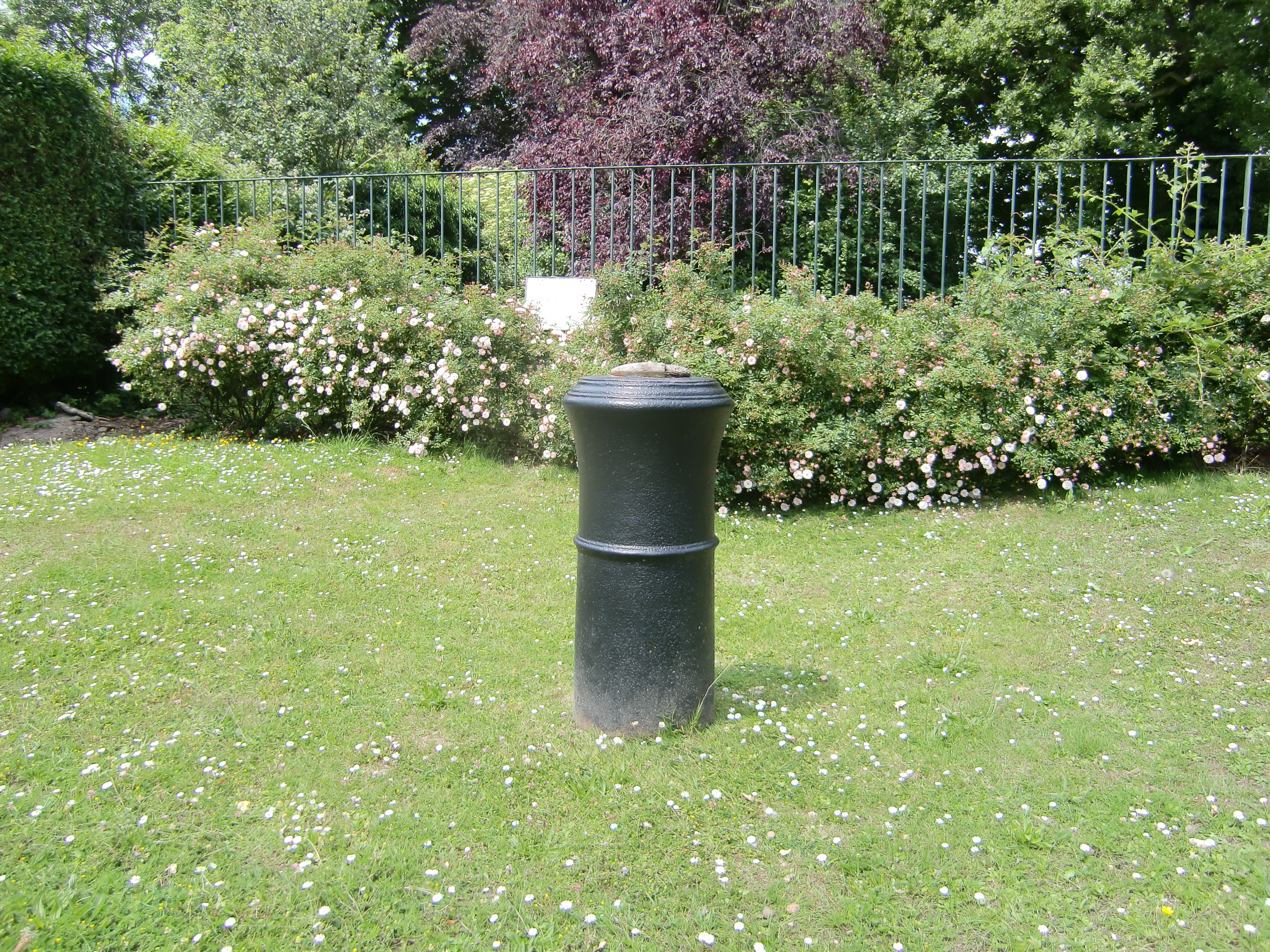
The cannon marking the Hampton end of the baseline in Roy Grove

The ground was cleared of bushes and a preliminary measurement of the line was carried out with a 100 ft. steel chain of 100 links prepared by Jesse Ramsden. It was the intention to measure more accurately with a set of three calibrated deal rods manufactured as 20 ft. in length. Three were supported on trestles and the ends aligned to an accuracy of a thousandth part of an inch. The first rod was then carried to the end of the third, an operation to be repeated 1,370 times. Unfortunately the deal rods had to be abandoned because of their susceptibility to lengthen and shorten in wet weather, and they were replaced by one-inch-thick rods made of glass. The rods were not affected by humidity but it was key to correct for thermal expansion. There was also a correction to sea level since the calculation of the survey was referred to that height. The final measurement gives the length of the base as 27404.01 ft. The measurement of the baseline to such a high standard of precision was a remarkable achievement and in recognition the Royal Society awarded Roy the Copley Medal in 1785.

In 1784 the ends of the baseline were marked by the central axes of two vertical wooden pipes over which the theodolite was centred for measurements from the base: the pipes could also support flagstaffs as markers when the base was sighted from other stations (or one end from another). After the resurvey in 1791 (OS1791-1794) the pipes were replaced by cannons which are still in place although it is certain that the cannons have been disturbed and slightly moved over the intervening years. The modern locations of the southeast end points is in Roy Grove, Hampton. The northwest end at Heathrow Airport is situated on the northern perimeter road. Plaques adjacent to the cannons read as follows:

THIS TABLET WAS AFFIXED IN 1926 TO COMMEMORATE THE 200TH
ANNIVERSARY OF THE BIRTH OF MAJOR GENERAL WILLIAM ROY F.R.S.,
BORN 4TH MAY 1726 – DIED 1ST JULY 1790.
HE CONCEIVED THE IDEA OF CARRYING OUT THE TRIANGULATION OF THIS
COUNTRY AND OF CONSTRUCTING A COMPLETE AND ACCURATE MAP, AND
THEREBY LAID THE FOUNDATION OF THE ORDNANCE SURVEY.
THIS GUN MARKS THE S.E. TERMINAL OF THE BASE WHICH WAS MEASURED IN 1784
UNDER THE SUPERVISION OF GENERAL ROY, AS PART OF THE
OBSERVATIONS FOR DETERMINING THE RELATIVE POSITIONS OF THE
GREENWICH AND PARIS OBSERVATORIES – THIS MEASUREMENT WAS
RENDERED POSSIBLE BY THE MUNIFICENCE OF H.M. KING GEORGE III, WHO
INSPECTED THE WORK ON 21ST AUGUST 1784.
THE BASE WAS MEASURED AGAIN IN 1791 BY CAPTAIN MUDGE, AS THE
COMMENCEMENT OF THE PRINCIPAL TRIANGULATION OF GREAT BRITAIN.
LENGTH OF BASE – REDUCED TO M.S.L.
• AS MEASURED BY ROY – 27404.01 FEET
• AS MEASURED BY MUDGE – 27404.24 FEET
• DETERMINED BY CLARKE IN 1858 IN TERMS OF THE ORDNANCE SURVEY
STANDARD O1 – 27406.19 FEET

== Waiting for Ramsden ==
Once the baseline had been measured Roy was keen to press on with the triangulation as soon as possible but he was thwarted by Ramsden's failure to produce the new theodolite. This led to a certain amount of acrimony and Roy went so far as to accuse Ramsden of being remiss and dilatory – in public and in his next report in the Philosophical Transactions.

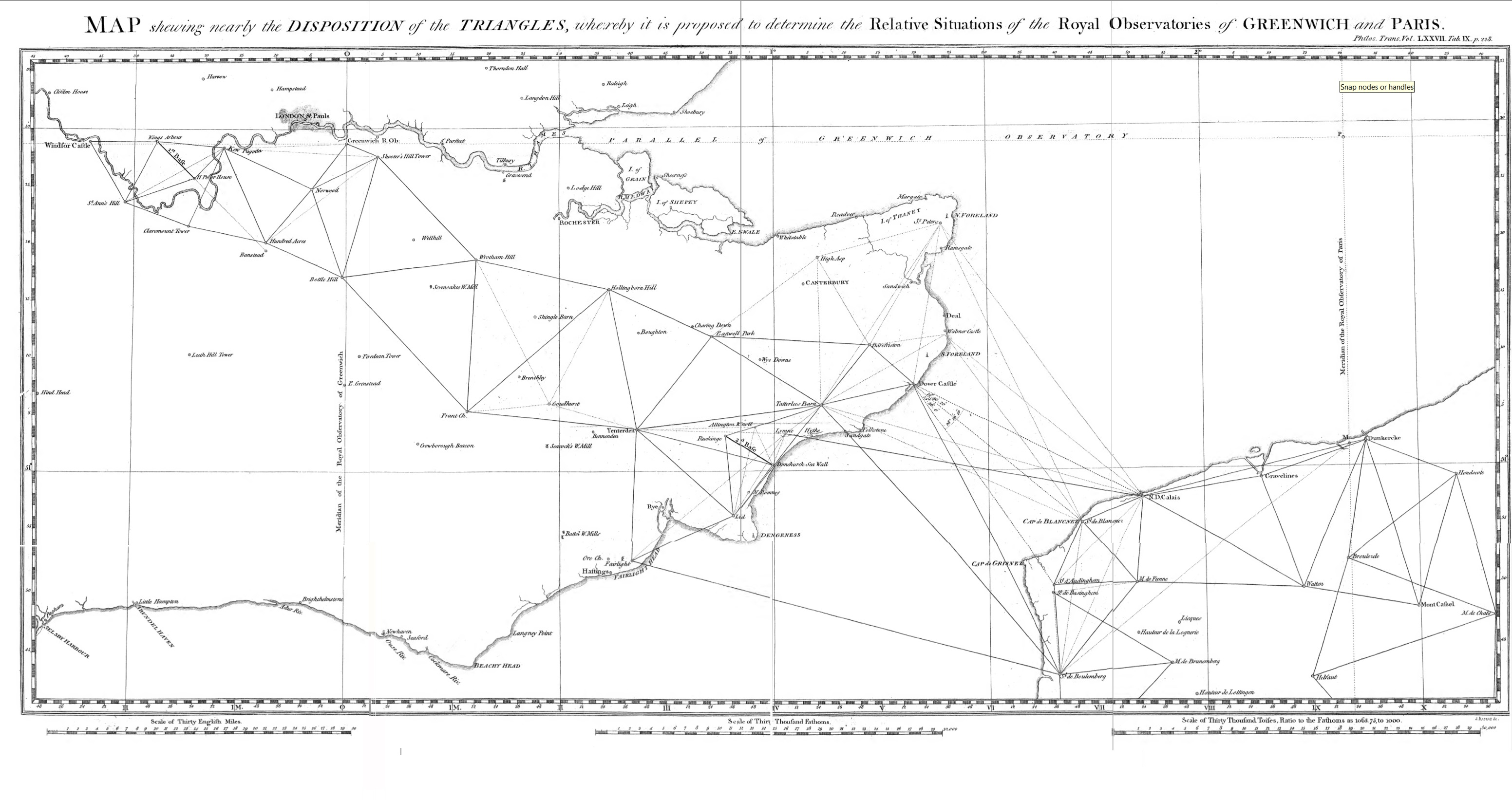
The proposed triangulation mesh across the English Channel between England and France.

The 1787 report is witness to how Roy occupied himself whilst waiting for the theodolite. The first section deals with the proposed route of the survey. Greater accuracy is achieved if the triangles are kept regular in shape, and the figure shows that most are close to equilateral, with departures only where the triangles step down in size toward the bases and where they have to stretch over the English Channel. Typical sides are about 20 miles but the lines which cross the Channel are up to 45 miles in length.

The second part of the report is a thorough examination of the results of Cassini's survey of France between Paris and Dunkirk. The third part includes a comparison of seven models for the Figure of the Earth, deduced from both meridian arcs and pendulum experiments, and Roy goes on to propose further meridian arcs in India and Russia, as well as an arc of longitude at the equator. Finally, he makes a plea for the continuation of the survey to the rest of Great Britain.

== Borda's circle ==
In addition to the construction delay, the Ramsden theodolite was relatively large and clumsy. Once the French team join in earnest, Cesar-François Cassini de Thury brought in Pierre Méchain and he brought in the repeating circle, an instrument for geodetic surveying, developed from the reflecting circle by Étienne Lenoir in 1784. Invented by Jean-Charles de Borda it was as capable of accurate measurement as Ramsden theodolite but much smaller. The repeating circle aimed at avoiding observational errors. The principle was to multiply the observations of the same angle, enough to no longer find any significant difference between several consecutive measurements made on different parts of the circle. It would later be used to measure the meridian arc from Dunkirk to Barcelona by Jean Baptiste Delambre and Pierre Méchain.

== The triangulation, 1787 ==
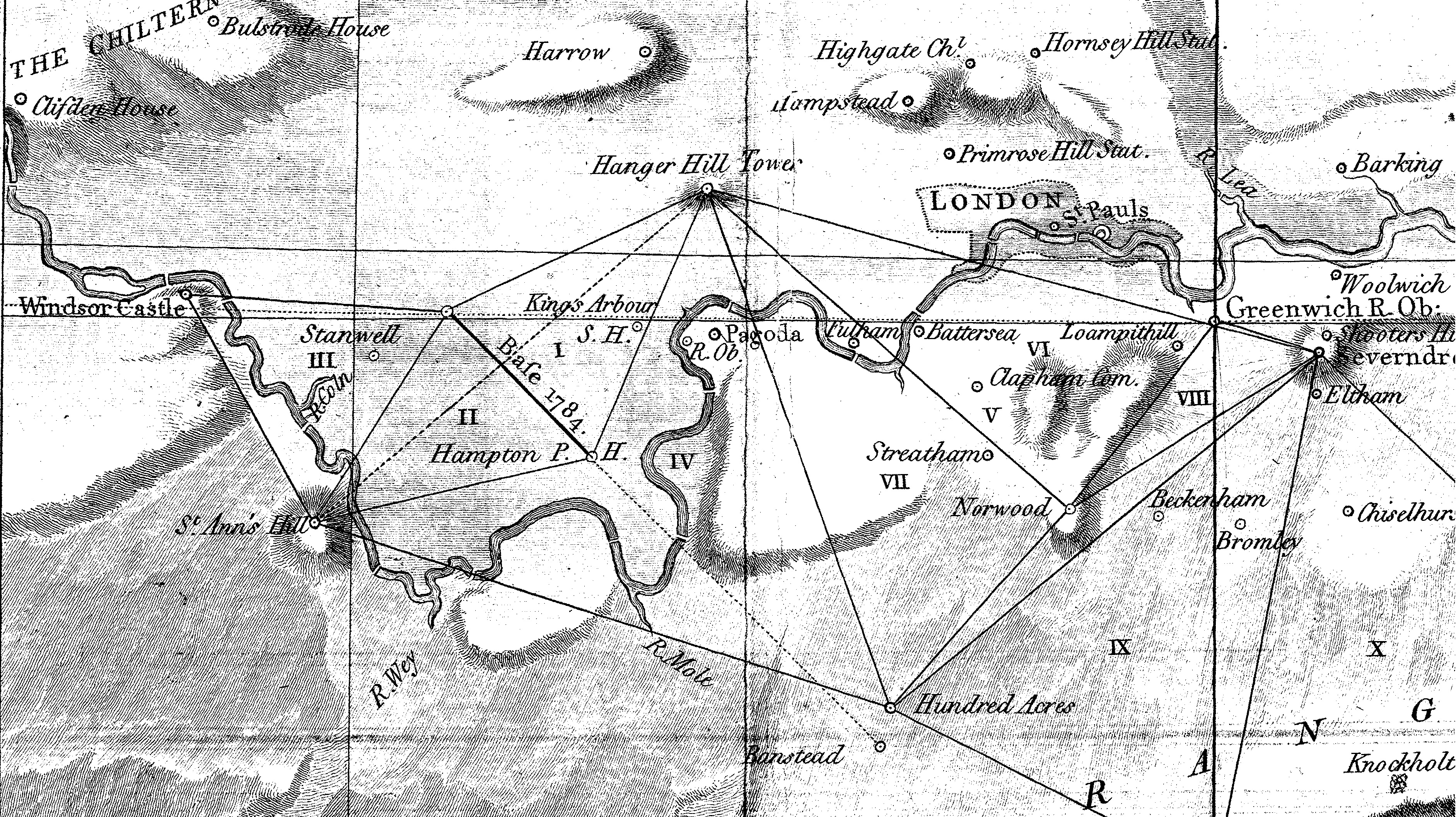
The first triangles surveyed, from Windsor Castle in the west to the Royal Observatory, Greenwich in the east.

Ramsden's theodolite was eventually delivered in the summer of 1787, and all haste was made to complete as much as possible before winter. The first triangles were from the ends of the base to Hanger Hill Tower in Ealing and St Ann's Hill in Chertsey, with an additional sight to Windsor Castle from the NW end only. Thus two angles were measured at the SE end of the base and four angles at the NW end. The theodolite was then moved to Hanger Hill where the ends of the base line were observed from the other direction and another three new sight lines established to the Royal Observatory, Greenwich, Upper Norwood and Hundred Acres (Banstead). In this way the mesh of triangles was extended down towards the coast where sights could be made on some of the French stations that had been measured in the course of Cassini's triangulation. The figure below shows the actual triangulation, the relief making the structure more understandable. Note the second base at Romney Marsh. By comparing the measured length with the length as calculated through the triangulation mesh it was possible to assess the accuracy of the framework.

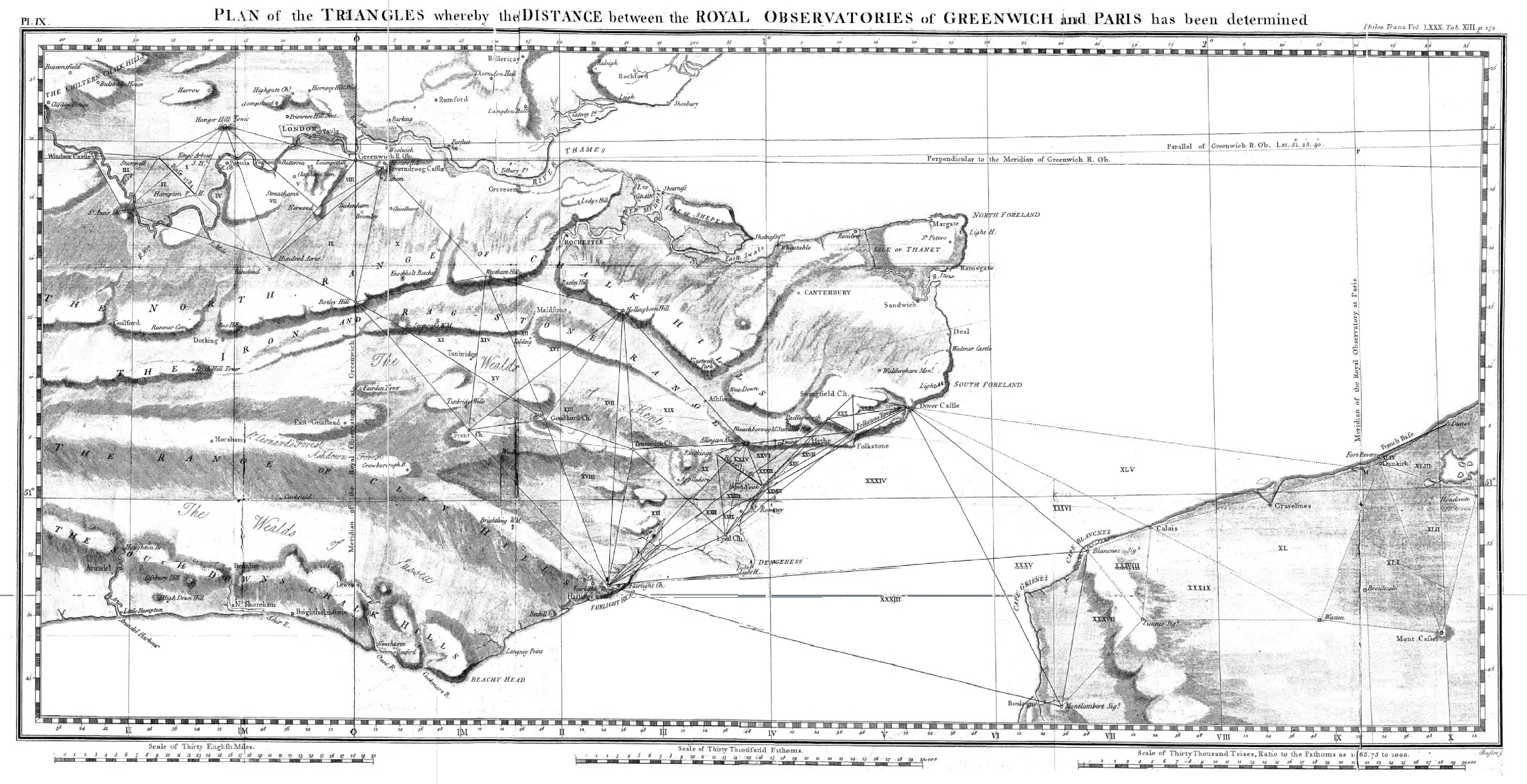
The actual triangulation mesh. Its baselines are depicted: ‘Base 1784’ is shown north of the Thames at top left, while ‘Base 1787’ is above left of Romney on the coast.

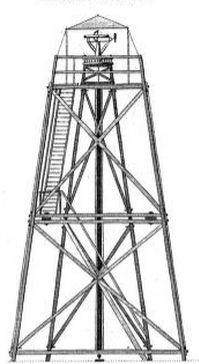
Portable scaffold for the great theodolite, showing the separate inner and outer supports

The process seems deceptively simple but it demanded much in the way of perseverance and organisation. Once the theodolite was on a station, signal men were sent to all the other stations that were to be observed from that point, typically five or six stations but as many as 10 in the case of Fairlight Head in East Sussex. For short distances a simple flagstaff would suffice but for the longer sights it was necessary to use lights at night. The brightest lights, so called white lights, were obtained by burning an incendiary mixture that lasted for a short time only. The cross-channel use of these lights entailed careful timing arrangements which could take into account the vagaries of the weather and pocket watches. At many stations, for the theodolite or signals, it was necessary to raise the instrument on a portable tower over 30 ft. high. The tower had two components: an inner frame supported the instrument and the outer supported the observers, thus minimising the disturbance to the instrument.

== The final report ==
The final report of 1790 presents figures for the distance between Paris and Greenwich as well as the precise latitude, longitude and height of the British triangulation stations. Throughout the survey Roy took every opportunity to fix the position of as many secondary landmarks as possible in the hope that they would be used as a basis for future topographic surveys from which new maps could be prepared for the counties of Middlesex, Surrey, Kent and Sussex. In fact these counties were re-surveyed during the course of the Principal Triangulation of Great Britain which commenced in 1791, one year after he died. At the time of his death he was correcting the final proofs of his report and the work was brought to a conclusion by Isaac Dalby, a senior civilian employee of the Board of Ordnance who had organised the calculations of the triangles.

== See also ==
- Arc measurement
- Principal Triangulation of Great Britain
- Ordnance Survey
- Surveying
- Triangulation

== Bibliography ==
- Insley, Jane (2008). The Tale of the Great Theodolites (PDF). Integrating the Generations: FIG Working Week 14–19 June 2008. Sweden.
- Maskelyne, Nevil (1787). "Concerning the Latitude and Longitude of the Royal Observatory at Greenwich; With Remarks on a Memorial of the Late M. Cassini de Thury". Philosophical Transactions of the Royal Society of London. 75: 385–480. doi:10.1098/rstl.1787.0018. S2CID 186209872.
- Mudge, William; Dalby, Isaac; Edward, Williams (1794). "An Account of the Trigonometrical Survey Carried on in the Years 1791, 1792, 1793, and 1794". Philosophical Transactions of the Royal Society. 84: 414–622. doi:10.1098/rstl.1795.0023.
- Owen, Tim; Pilbeam, Elaine (1992). Ordnance Survey, map makers to Britain since 1791. Southampton: Ordnance Survey (HMSO). ISBN 9780319002490. OCLC 28220563. Freely available online at the Ordnance Survew, Owen and Pilbeam
- Porter, Whitworth (1889), History of the Corps of Royal Engineers, London: Longmans, Green, and Co Volume 1; Volume 2.
- Seymour, W. A., ed. (1980). A History of the Ordnance Survey. Folkestone, England: Dawson. ISBN 0-7129-0979-6. OCLC 654935343. Freely available online at the Ordnance Survey, Seymour
- Roy, William (1785). "An Account of the Measurement of a Base on Hounslow-Heath". Philosophical Transactions of the Royal Society of London. 75: 385–480. doi:10.1098/rstl.1785.0024.
- Roy, William (1787). "An Account of the Mode Proposed to be Followed in Determining the Relative Situation of the Royal Observatories of Greenwich and Paris". Philosophical Transactions of the Royal Society of London. 77: 188–226. doi:10.1098/rstl.1787.0019. S2CID 186214773. Plates follow text
- Roy, William (1790). "An Account of the Trigonometrical Operation, Whereby the Distance between the Meridians of the Royal Observatories of Greenwich and Paris Has Been Determined". Philosophical Transactions of the Royal Society of London. 80: 111–254. doi:10.1098/rstl.1790.0015. S2CID 186211548.
