= Arc measurement of Delambre and Méchain =

Geodetic survey from 1792 to 1798

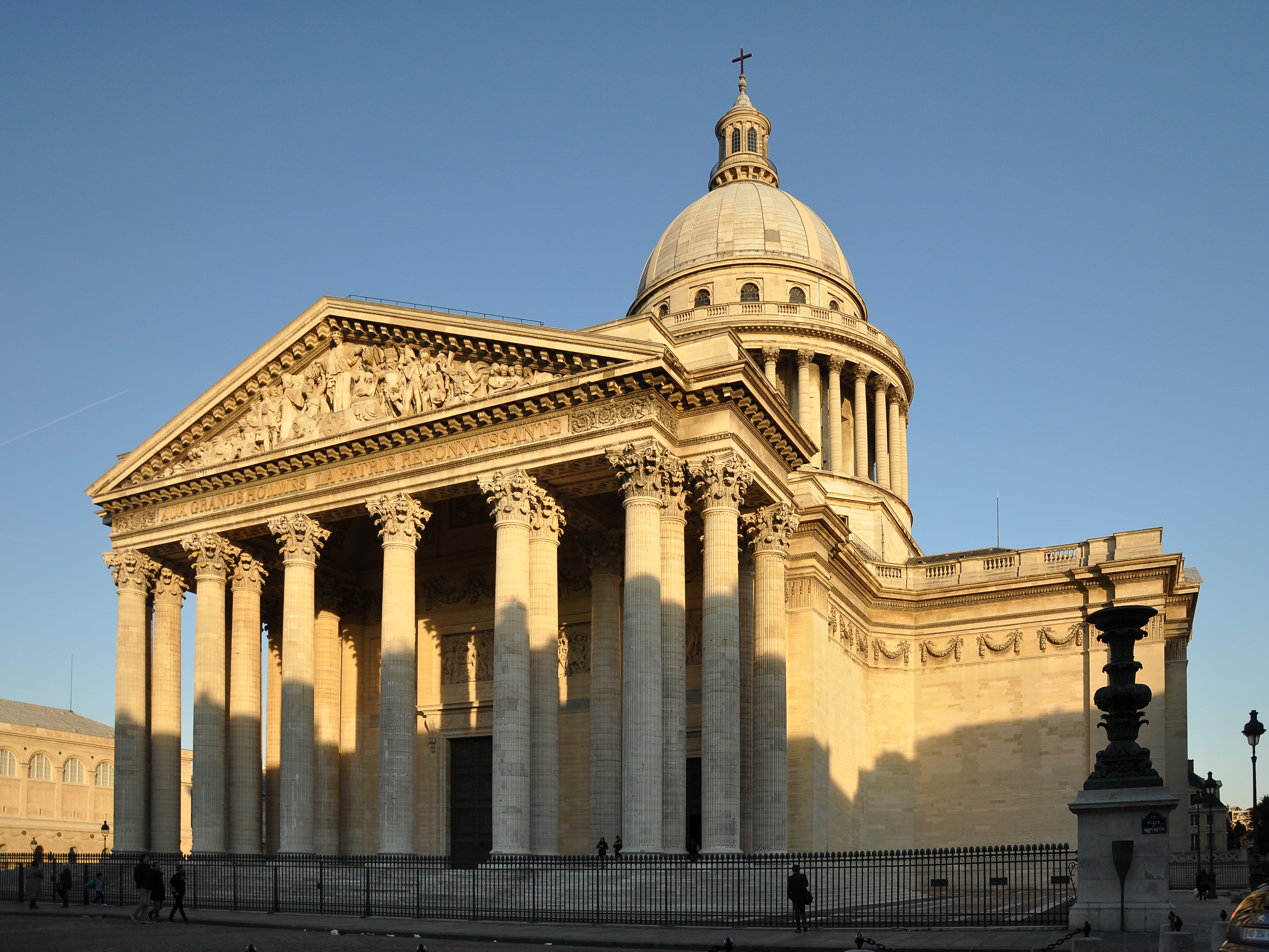
The Panthéon in Paris. At the time of Jean-Baptiste Joseph Delambre, it served as a warehouse for all the old weights and measures which had been sent by towns throughout France in anticipation of the standardisation of weights and measures by the establishment of the new decimal metric system.

The arc measurement of Delambre and Méchain was a geodetic survey carried out by Jean-Baptiste Delambre and Pierre Méchain in 1792–1798 to measure an arc section of the Paris meridian between Dunkirk and Barcelona. This arc measurement served as part of the basis for the original definition of the metre.

Until the French Revolution of 1789, France was particularly affected by the proliferation of length measures; the conflicts related to units helped precipitate the revolution. In addition to rejecting standards inherited from feudalism, linking determination of a decimal unit of length with the figure of the Earth was an explicit goal. This project culminated in an immense effort to measure a meridian passing through Paris in order to define the metre.

When question of measurement reform was placed in the hands of the French Academy of Sciences, a commission, whose members included Jean-Charles de Borda, Joseph-Louis Lagrange, Pierre-Simon Laplace, Gaspard Monge and the Marquis de Condorcet, decided that the new measure should be equal to one ten-millionth of the distance from the North Pole to the Equator (the quadrant of the Earth's circumference), measured along the meridian passing through Paris at the longitude of Paris Observatory. Since this survey, the Panthéon became the central geodetic station in Paris.

In 1791, Jean Baptiste Joseph Delambre and Pierre Méchain were commissioned to lead an expedition to accurately measure the distance between a belfry in Dunkerque and Montjuïc castle in Barcelona in order to calculate the length of the meridian arc through the centre of Paris Observatory. The official length of the Mètre des Archives was based on these measurements, but the definitive length of the metre required a value for the non-spherical shape of the Earth, known as the flattening of the Earth. Pierre Méchain's and Jean-Baptiste Delambre's measurements were combined with the results of the French Geodetic Mission to the Equator and a value of 1/334 was found for the Earth's flattening.

The distance from the North Pole to the Equator was then extrapolated from the measurement of the Paris meridian arc between Dunkirk and Barcelona and the length of the metre was established, in relation to the Toise de l'Académie also called toise of Peru, which had been constructed in 1735 for the French Geodesic Mission to Peru, as well as to Borda's double-toise N°1, one of the four twelve feet (French: pieds) long ruler, part of the baseline measuring instrument devised for this survey. When the final result was known, the Mètre des Archives a platinum bar whose length was closest to the meridional definition of the metre was selected and placed in the National Archives on 22 June 1799 (4 messidor An VII in the Republican calendar) as a permanent record of the result.

== Background ==
=== Meridian arc measurement ===
An arc measurement combines astronomically determined latitude measurements with physical survey measurements between two points on the Earth. When the two point lie on ah meridian arc, these two measurements can be combined to calculate Earth's meridional radius of curvature, one of the fundamental measurements of geodesy.

=== Instrumentation ===
For the triangulation of the Anglo-French Survey, César-François Cassini de Thury was assisted by Pierre Méchain. They used the repeating circle, an instrument for geodetic surveying, developed from the reflecting circle by Étienne Lenoir in 1784. He invented it while an assistant of Jean-Charles de Borda, who later improved the instrument. It was notable as being the equal of the great theodolite created by the renowned instrument maker, Jesse Ramsden. It would later be used to measure the meridian arc from Dunkirk to Barcelona by Jean Baptiste Delambre and Pierre Méchain as improvements in the measuring device designed by Borda and used for this survey also raised hopes for a more accurate determination of the length of the French meridian arc.

=== Motivation ===
From the French revolution of 1789 came an effort to reform measurement standards, leading ultimately to remeasure the meridian passing through Paris in order to define the metre. The question of measurement reform was placed in the hands of the French Academy of Sciences, who appointed a commission chaired by Jean-Charles de Borda. The commission of the French Academy of Sciences – whose members included Borda, Lagrange, Laplace, Monge and Condorcet – decided that the new measure should be equal to one ten-millionth of the distance from the North Pole to the Equator (the quadrant of the Earth's circumference), measured along the meridian passing through Paris at the longitude of Paris pantheon, which became the central geodetic station in Paris. Jean Baptiste Joseph Delambre obtained the fundamental co-ordinates of the Panthéon by triangulating all the geodetic stations around Paris from the Panthéon's dome.

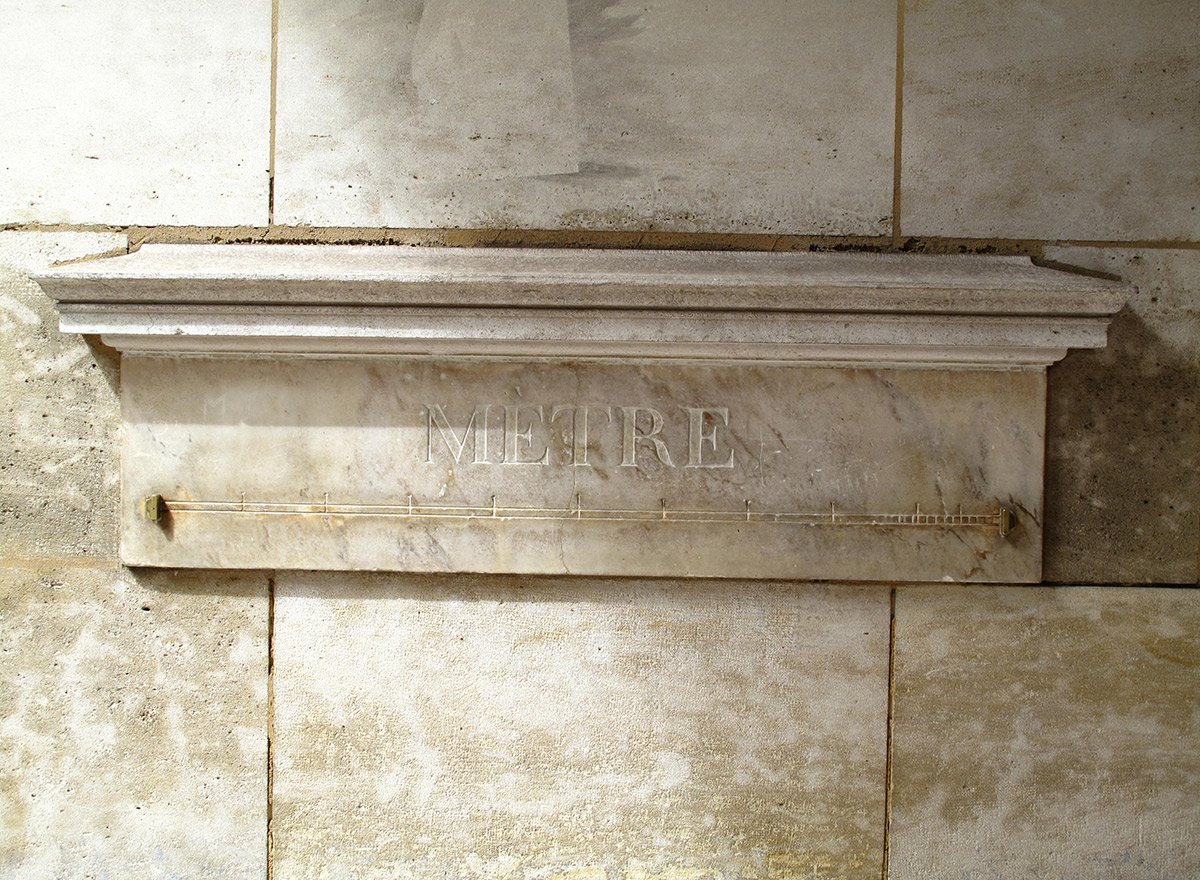
A copy of the "provisional" metre located in the wall of a building, 15 rue de Vaugirard, Paris. These metres were provisional (French: provisoire) because the expedition and the calculations to determine the definitive length of metre were not completed until 1799.

To put into practice the decision taken by the National Convention, on 1 August 1793, to disseminate the new units of the decimal metric system, it was decided to establish the length of the metre based on a fraction of the meridian in the process of being measured. The decision was taken to fix the length of a provisional metre (French: mètre provisoire) determined by the French meridian arc measurement, which had been carried out from Dunkirk to Perpignan by Nicolas Louis de Lacaille and Cesar-François Cassini de Thury and published by the latter in 1744. The length of the metre was established, in relation to the toise of the academy also called toise of Peru, at 3 feet 11.44 lines, taken at 13 degrees of the temperature scale of René-Antoine Ferchault de Réaumur in use at the time. This value was set by legislation on 7 April 1795. It was therefore metal bars of 443.44 lignes that were distributed in France in 1795–1796. This was the metre installed under the arcades of the rue de Vaugirard, almost opposite the entrance to the Senate.

=== Selection of the Paris meridian ===
Apart from the obvious consideration of safe access for French surveyors, the Paris meridian was also a sound choice for scientific reasons: a portion of the quadrant from Dunkirk to Barcelona (about 1000 km, or one-tenth of the total) could be surveyed with start- and end-points at sea level, and that portion was roughly in the middle of the quadrant, where the effects of the Earth's oblateness were expected not to have to be accounted for.

The expedition would take place after the Anglo-French Survey, thus the French meridian arc, which would extend northwards across the United Kingdom, would also extend southwards to Barcelona, later to Balearic Islands. Jean-Baptiste Biot and François Arago would publish in 1821 their observations completing those of Delambre and Mechain. It was an account of the length's variations of portions of one degree of amplitude of the meridian arc along the Paris meridian as well as the account of the variation of the seconds pendulum's length along the same meridian between Shetland and the Balearc Islands.

== The survey ==
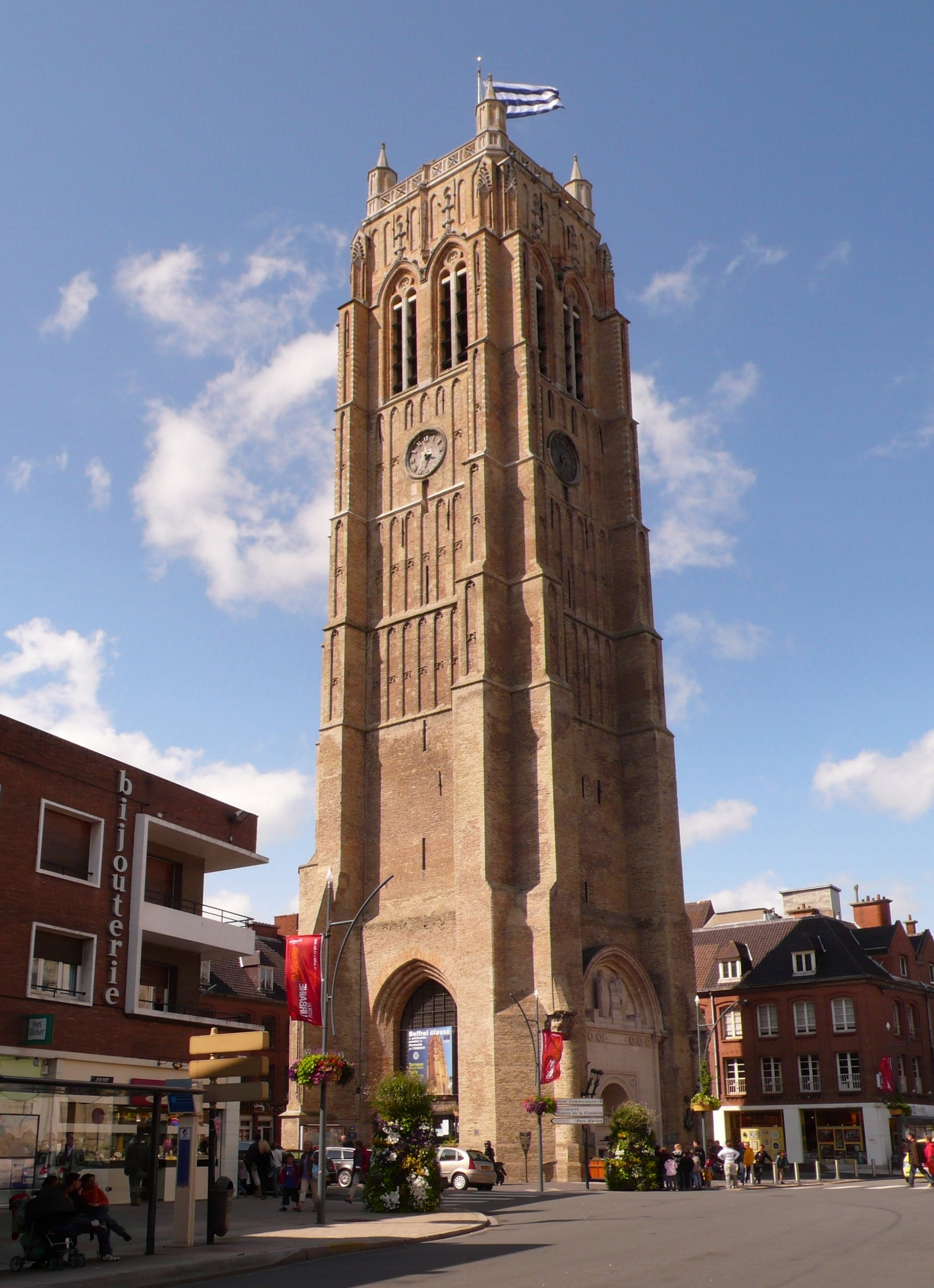
The free-standing belfry in Dunkirk on the French English Channel coast – the northerly end of the meridian survey of 1792–9

The task of surveying the meridian arc fell to Pierre Méchain and Jean-Baptiste Delambre, and took more than six years (1792–1798). The technical difficulties were not the only problems the surveyors had to face in the convulsed period of the aftermath of the Revolution: Méchain and Delambre, and later François Arago, were imprisoned several times during their surveys, and Méchain died in 1804 of yellow fever, which he contracted while trying to improve his original results in northern Spain.

The project was split into two parts – the northern section of 742.7 km from the belfry of the Church of Saint-Éloi, Dunkirk to Rodez Cathedral which was surveyed by Delambre and the southern section of 333.0 km from Rodez to the Montjuïc Fortress, Barcelona which was surveyed by Méchain. Although Méchain's sector was half the length of Delambre, it included the Pyrenees and hitherto unsurveyed parts of Spain.

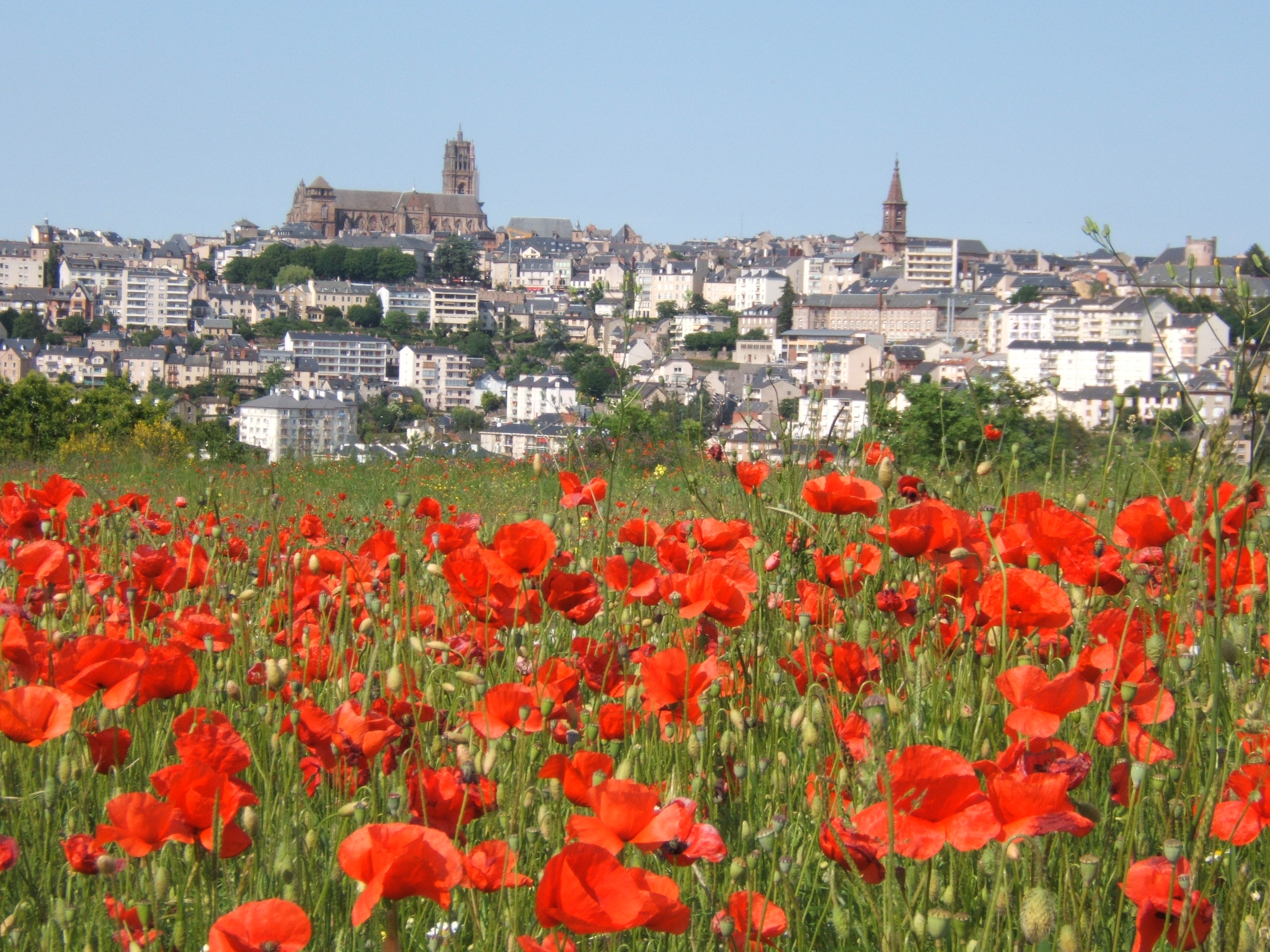
The north and south sections of the meridinal survey met at Rodez Cathedral in southern France, seen here dominating the Rodez skyline at left.

Delambre measured a baseline of about 10 km (6,075.90 toises) in length along a straight road between Melun and Lieusaint. In an operation taking six weeks, the baseline was accurately measured using four platinum rods, each of length two toises (a toise being about 1.949 m). These measuring devices consisted of bimetallic rulers in platinum and brass fixed together at one extremity to assess the variations in length produced by any change in temperature. Borda's double-toise N°1, which had been compared to the Toise of Peru, became the main reference for measuring all geodetic bases in France. Intercomparisons of baseline measuring devices were essential for metrological traceability. (Note: In 1886, Adolphe Hirsch, representative of the Swiss Geodetic Commission in both the International Geodetic Association and the International Committee for Weights and Measures, proposed that all toises (a traditional French unit of length) that had served as geodetic standards in Europe be compared at the International Bureau of Weights and Measures. These meticulous comparisons, benefiting from advancements in thermometry, revealed that the Mètre des Archives (the original standard metre) was not exactly equal to 443.296 lignes of the toise du Pérou (the toise of Peru), but was, in fact, approximately 0.013 millimetres too short. Assuming a linear thermal expansion coefficient of 11.6 × 10⁻⁶ °C⁻¹ for steel, this discrepancy can be linked to a potential temperature error of about 1.3 °C during the calibration of Borda’s apparatus (the geodetic standard used for the arc measurement of Delambre and Méchain) against the toise of Peru. This possibility had first been suspected by Johan Georg Tralles in 1799. The results of these comparisons allowed for the conversion of geodetic arcs measured in Germany into metres. The 1/66,000 discrepancy that had persisted between triangles common to both the German and French networks was reduced to 1/600,000—a figure at the very limit of the precision attainable by the geodetic operations of that era. Conversely, a discrepancy of 1/65,000 emerged between the French and Spanish triangulations when the French network—which, like the Spanish one, had previously relied on measurements taken with instruments calibrated against Borda’s "double-toise no. 1"—was recalculated in terms of the 1889 standard metre, which was itself calibrated against the Mètre des Archives.) Moreover, because of thermal expansion, geodesists tried to accurately assess temperature of standards in the field in order to avoid observational errors. Thereafter he used, where possible, the triangulation points used by Nicolas Louis de Lacaille in his 1739-1740 arc measurement. Méchain's baseline was of a similar length (6,006.25 toises), and also on a straight section of road between Vernet (in the Perpignan area) and Salces (now Salses-le-Chateau).

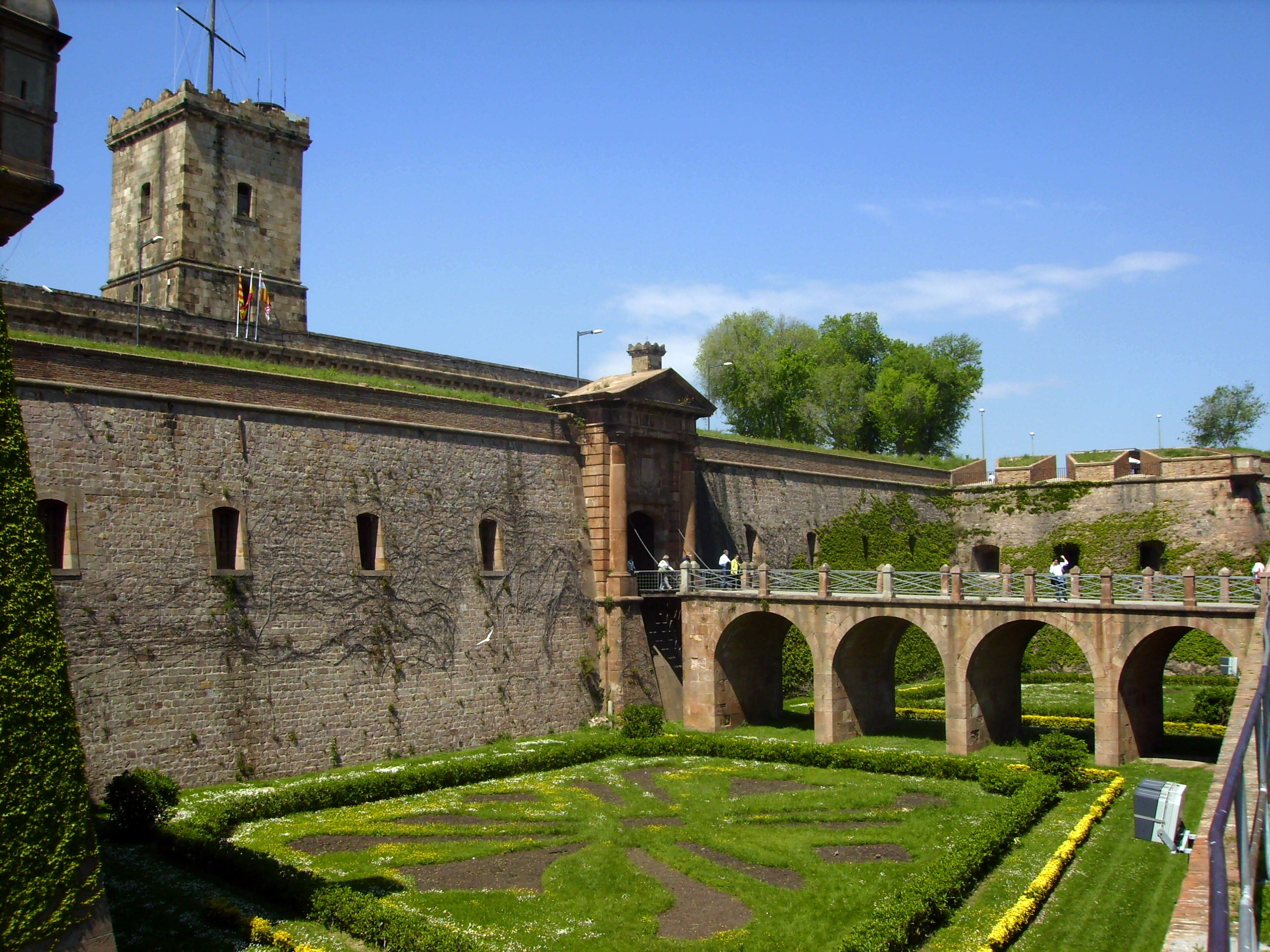
Montjuïc Castle in Barcelona, Spain – the southern end of the meridian arc

End of November 1798, Delambre and Méchain returned to Paris with their data, having completed the survey to meet a foreign commission composed of representatives of Batavian Republic: Henricus Aeneae and Jean Henri van Swinden, Cisalpine Republic: Lorenzo Mascheroni, Kingdom of Denmark: Thomas Bugge, Kingdom of Spain: Gabriel Císcar and Agustín de Pedrayes, Helvetic Republic: Johann Georg Tralles, Ligurian Republic: Ambrogio Multedo, Kingdom of Sardinia: Prospero Balbo, Antonio Vassali Eandi, Roman Republic: Pietro Franchini, Tuscan Republic: Giovanni Fabbroni who had been invited by Talleyrand. The French commission comprised Jean-Charles de Borda, Barnabé Brisson, Charles-Augustin de Coulomb, Jean Darcet, René Just Haüy, Joseph-Louis Lagrange, Pierre- Simon Laplace, Louis Lefèvre-Ginneau, Pierre Méchain and Gaspar de Prony.

== Results ==
In 1799, a commission including Johann Georg Tralles, Jean Henri van Swinden, Adrien-Marie Legendre, Pierre-Simon Laplace, Gabriel Císcar, Pierre Méchain and Jean-Baptiste Delambre calculated the distance from Dunkirk to Barcelona using the data of the triangulation between these two towns and determined the portion of the distance from the North Pole to the Equator it represented. Pierre-Simon Laplace originally hoped to figure out the Earth ellipsoid problem from the sole measurement of the arc from Dunkirk to Barcelona. However, when, about 1804, he would calculate it using the least squares method, this portion of the meridian arc led for the flattening to the value of 1/150 considered as unacceptable. This value was the result of a conjecture based on too limited data. Another flattening of the Earth would be calculated by Delambre, who would exclude the results of the French Geodetic Mission to Lapland and would found a value close to 1/300 combining the results of Delambre and Méchain arc measurement with those of the Spanish-French Geodetic Mission taking in account a correction of the astronomic arc.

Eventually, the distance from the North Pole to the Equator was extrapolated from the measurement of the Paris meridian arc between Dunkirk and Barcelona and was determined as 5130740 toises assuming an Earth flattening of 1/334. The Weights and Measures Commission adopted, in 1799, this value for the flattening based on an analysis by Pierre-Simon Laplace who combined the French Geodesic Mission to the Equator and the data of the arc measurement of Delambre and Méchain. Combining these two data sets Laplace succeeded to estimate the flattening of the Earth ellipsoid and was happy to find that it also fitted well with his estimate 1/336 based on 15 pendulum measurements.

As the length of the metre had been set by legislation to be equal to one ten-millionth of this distance, it was defined as 0.513074 toise or 3 feet and 11.296 lines of the Toise of Peru, which had been constructed in 1735 for the French Geodesic Mission to Peru. When the final result was known, a bar whose length was closest to the definition of the legal metre was selected and placed in the National Archives on 22 June 1799 (4 messidor An VII in the Republican calendar) as a permanent record of the result. Another platinum metre, calibrated against the Mètre des Archives, and twelve iron ones were made as secondary standards. One of the iron metre standards was brought to the United States in 1805. (Note: In 2007, a comparison between the American "Committee meter" (an iron copy of the Mètre des Archives brought in the United States by Ferdinand Rudolph Hassler in 1805) and its Swiss counterpart was conducted at NIST and METAS. The two metre standards can be considered perfectly equivalent, with a difference of only (0.96 ± 3.0) micrometres. The low quality of the measuring surfaces accounts for the significant uncertainty in the measurements when compared to modern-day standards.) It became known as the Committee Meter in the United States and served as a standard of length in the United States Coast Survey until 1890.

== Challenges to accuracy ==
However, Louis Puissant declared in 1836 to the French Academy of Sciences that Jean Baptiste Joseph Delambre and Pierre Méchain had made errors in the triangulation of the meridian arc, which had been used for determining the length of the metre. This is why Antoine Yvon Villarceau verified the geodetic operations at eight points of the Paris meridian arc from 1861 to 1866. Some of the errors in the operations of Delambre and Méchain were then corrected.

In his 2002 book The measure of all things, Ken Alder recalled that the legal metre is about 0.2 millimetres shorter than it should be according to its original proposed definition. Since long, the length of the legal metre has been questioned because of an uncertainty in Méchain's determination of the latitude of the southern end of the arc measurement besides other problems in the publication of his results. This 2 km error in the Earth quadrant appeared to Adrien-Marie Legendre when he compared 5130740 toises obtained for the length of the definitive metre with 5132430 toises deduced from the distance measured by Nicolas-Louis de Lacaille of a meridian arc of one degree at 45° of latitude which was used to fix the length of the provisional metre. He suspected a deviation of plumb-line due to gravity anomaly that geodesists now call vertical deflection. Indeed, 95% of the missing length of the legal metre was due to not taking the effect of vertical deflection into account, while wrong assumption of flattening of the Earth ellipsoid accounted for 3% of the error and the length of the meridian arc as measured by Delambre and Méchain contributed for less than 2% of the total error. Despite the precision of their survey, the definition of the metre was beyond Delambre and Méchain's reach as gravity anomalies had not yet been studied. Indeed, the geoid is a ball which can be approximately assimilated to an ellipsoid, however meridians have such differencies from one another in shape and length that any extrapolation is impossible from only one arc measurement.

== See also ==
- Cartography of France
- Earth's circumference#Historical use in the definition of units of measurement
- Earth radius § History
- International Bureau of Weights and Measures
- History of geodesy § Prime meridian and standard of length
- History of the metre § Meridional definition
- Meridian arc § 17th and 18th centuries
- Metre § Early adoption of the metre as a scientific unit of length: the forerunners
- Metre Convention
- Paris meridian#The West Europe-Africa Meridian-arc
