= Josef de Mendoza y Ríos =

18th and 19th-century Spanish astronomer and mathematician

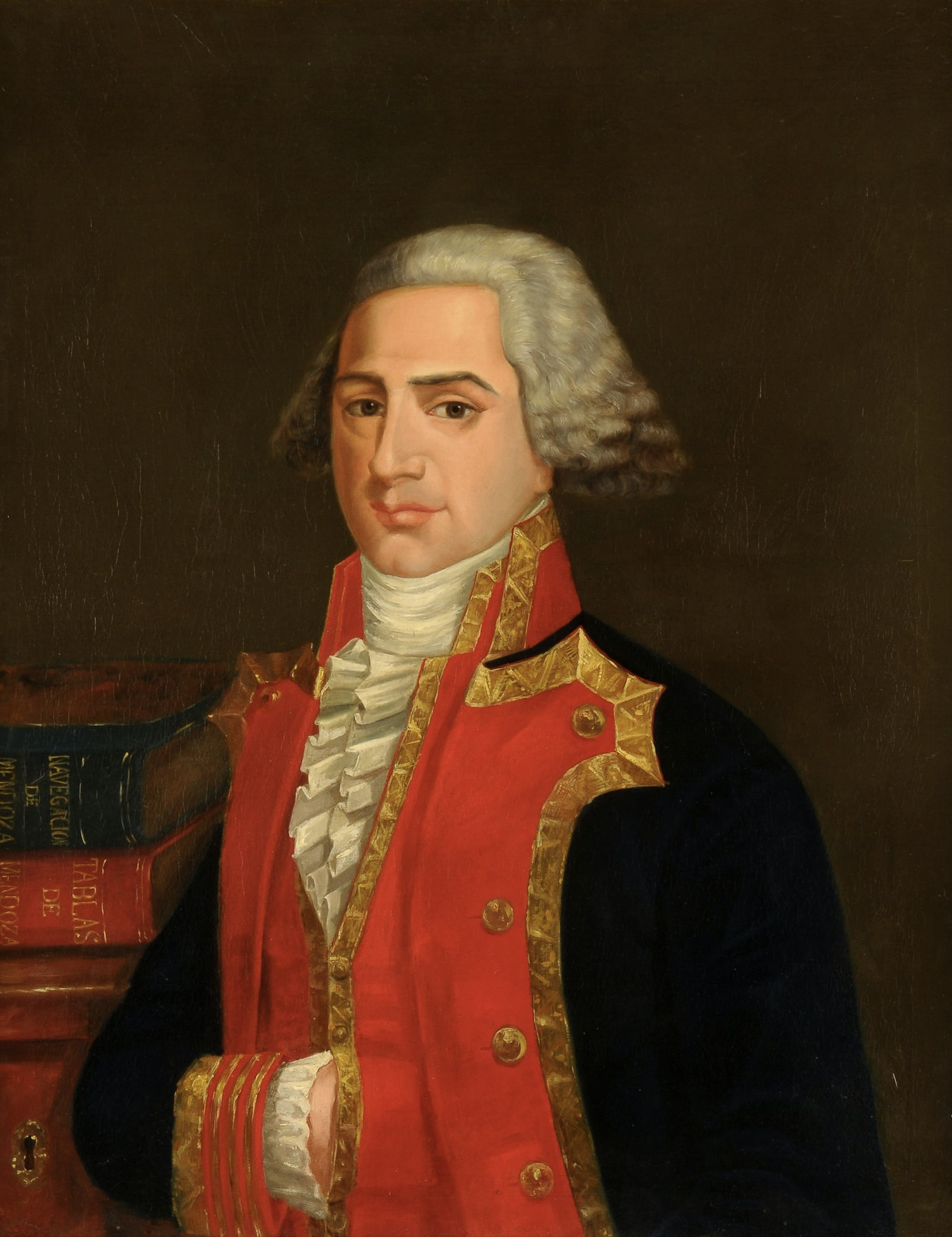
- Portrait of Mendoza y Ríos.
- Born: 29 January 1761; Sevilla, Spain
- Died: 4 March 1816 (aged 55); Brighton, England
- Known for: His Tratado de Navegación and the Tables for facilitating the calculations of nautical astronomy.
- Scientific career
- Fields: Navigation, Astronomy, Mathematics
- Institutions: Royal Society (1793). French Academy of Sciences.

Josef (also José or Joseph) de Mendoza y Ríos (1761–1816) was a Spanish astronomer and mathematician of the 18th century, famous for his work on navigation. The first work of Mendoza y Ríos was published in 1787: his treatise about the science and technique of navigation in two tomes. He also published several tables for facilitating the calculations of nautical astronomy and useful in navigation to calculate the latitude of a ship at sea from two altitudes of the sun, and the longitude from the distances of the moon from a celestial body.

In the field of the nautical instruments, he improved the reflecting circle.

In 1816, he was elected a foreign member of the Royal Swedish Academy of Sciences.

== Biography ==
In 1787, De Mendoza published his first work, his treatise on the sciences and techniques of navigation in two volumes, a reference work of the time. After this, he proposed the creation of the maritime library, located in Cádiz, which would eventually become the Depósito Hidrográfico of the navy.

He also published several tables using the haversine method (of his invention), to facilitate the calculations of nautical astronomy and navigation. Mainly oriented to the calculation of the latitude of a ship at sea by means of two heights of the Sun and the time elapsed between them, and to the obtaining of the longitude by the method of lunar distances.

In the field of nautical instruments, he perfected the reflecting circle of Borda. In 1816, he was elected a foreign member of the Royal Swedish Academy of Sciences.

As a curious fact about the method of calculation of that time, while writing the last edition of his famous Lunar Tables, in 1815 (ten months before he died drowned in Brighton), he wrote a letter to general Espinosa y Tello (a good friend of him), where he said verbatim: "... I have at hand Works of such magnitude that two calculators cannot cope, I will take four or five more calculators on my return to London ... "

== His work ==
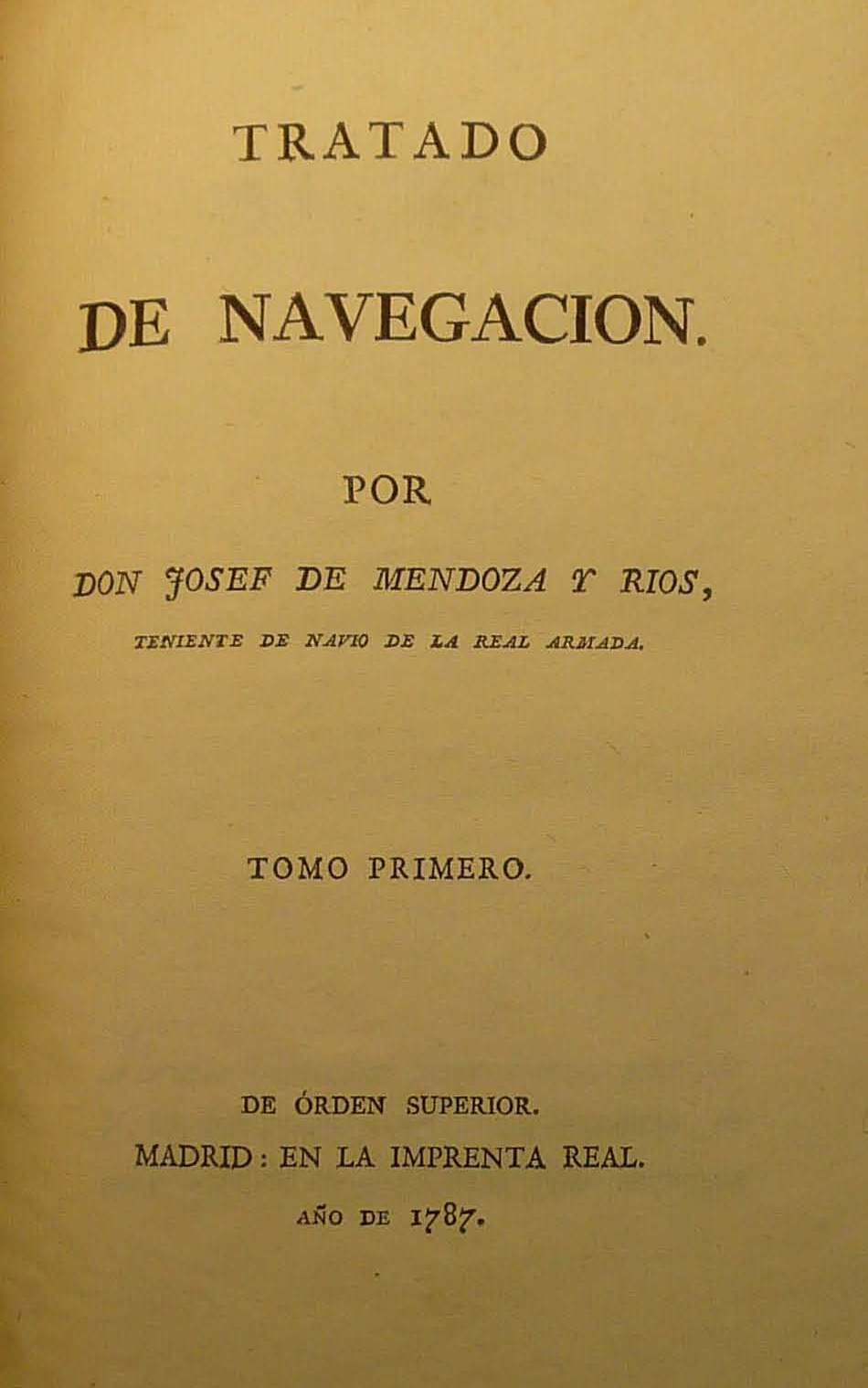
Tratado de Navegacion. Tomo primero

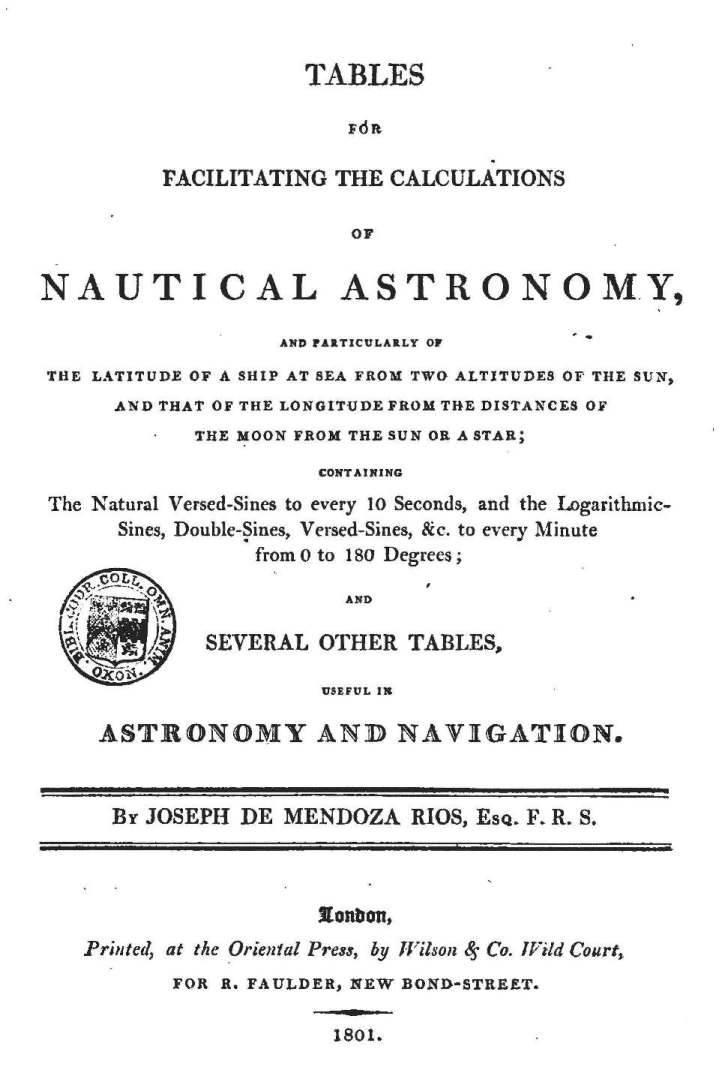
Tables for facilitating the calculations of nautical astronomy

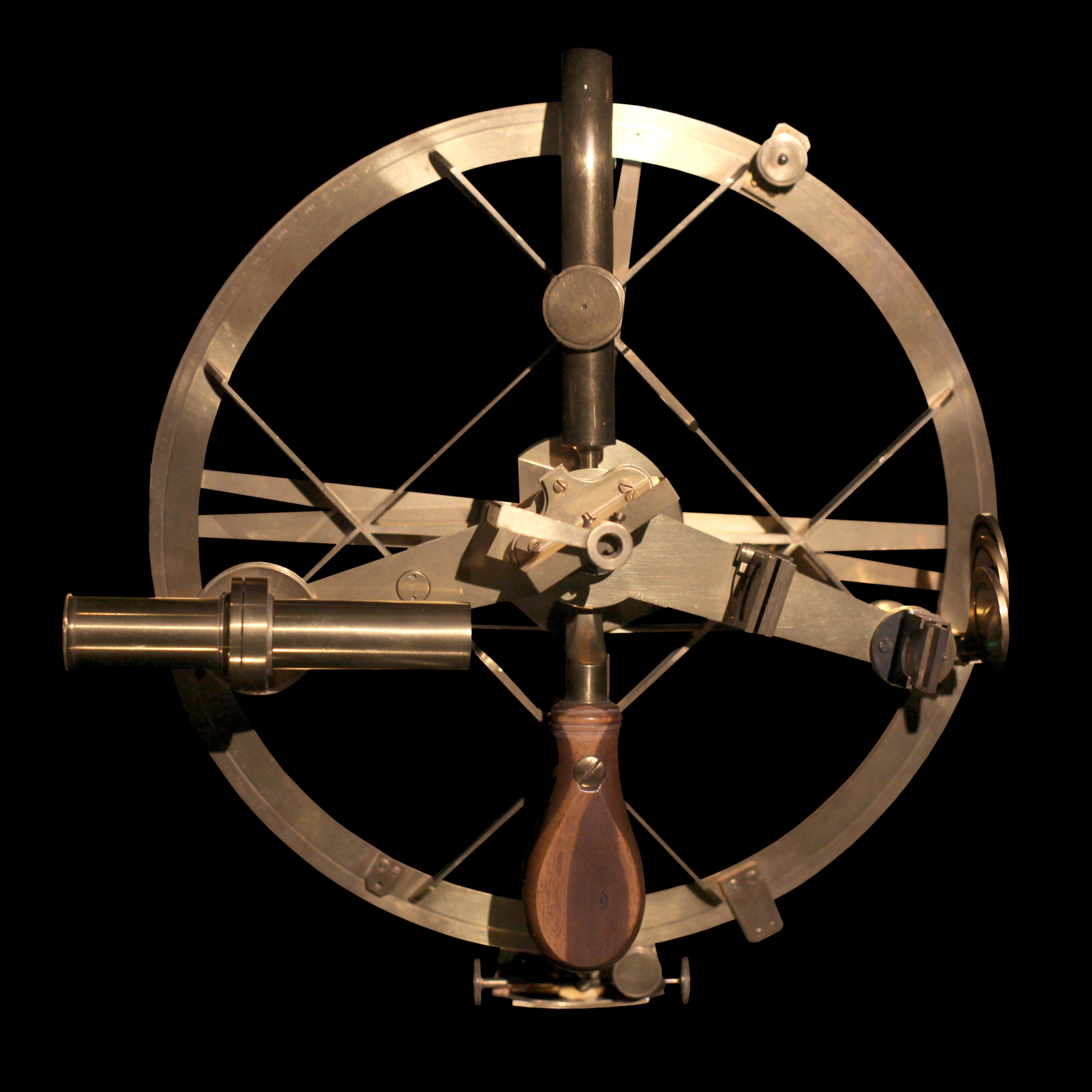
Mendoza repeating circle, made circa 1810 by Edward Troughton, London. On display at the Musée national de la Marine, Paris.

1. Tratado de Navegación. Tomo I y tomo II, Madrid, Imprenta Real, 1787.
2. Memoria sobre algunos métodos nuevos de calcular la longitud por las distancias lunares: y application de su teórica á la solucion de otros problemas de navegacion. Madrid, Imprenta Real, 1795.
3. Colección de tablas para varios usos de la navegación. Madrid, Imprenta Real, 1800. (Traducida al inglés al año siguiente).
4. Table des latitudes croissantes Connoissance des Temps... pour l’annee comune 1793 (1791): 303.
5. Mémoire sur la methode de trouver la latitude par le moyen de deux hauteurs du soleil, del’intervalle de tems écoule entre les deux observations, et de la latitude estimée. Connoissance des Temps pour l’année comune 1793 (1791): 289–302.
6. Mémoire sur la méthode de trouver la latitude par le moyen de deux hauteurs du soleil, de l'intervalle de temps écoulé entre les deux observations et de la latitude estimée, ... [Paris], [S.I.], [1793].8°, 14 p. et planche.
7. Memoire sur le calcul de la longitude en mer, par les distances de la lune au soleil et aux étoiles. Connaissance des Temps... (1796–1797): 258–284.
8. Recherches sur les solutions des principaux problemes de l'astronomie nautique. Philosophical Transactions, 87 (1797): 43–122.
9. Recherches sur les solutions des principaux problemes de l´astronomie nautique. London, [S.I.], 1797.4º, 4 + 85 p.
10. Tables to correct the observed altitudes of the sun, moon and the stars. London, [S.I.], [1801]4º, 92 p.
11. On an improved reflecting circle. Philosophical Transactions, 91 (1801): 363–374.
12. On an improved reflecting circle London, W. Bulmer, 1801.4º, 14 p.
13. Tables for facilitating the calculations of nautical astronomy, and particularly of the latitude of a ship at sea from two altitudes of the sun, and that the longitude from the distances of the moon from the sun or a star, and particularly of the latitude of a ship at sea from two altitudes of the sun, and that of the longitude from the distances of the moon from the sun or a star; containing the natural versed – sines to every 10 seconds, and the logarithmic-sines, double-sines, versed-sines, &c. to every minute from 0 to 80 degrees; and several other tables, useful in astronomy and navigation. London, R. Faulder, 1801. 4º, 8 + 311 + 77 p. Appendix, containing tables for clearing the apparent distances of the moon from the sun or a star, from the effects of parallax and refraction. By H. Cavendish: 77 p. at end.
14. A complete collection of tables for navigation and nautical astronomy, with simple, concise and accurate methods for all the calculation useful at sea; particularly for deducing the longitude from lunar distance, and the latitude from two altitudes of the sun and the interval of time between the observations. London, printed by T. Bensley, sold by R. Faulder, etc., 1805. Folio, 12 + 47 + 670 p. + 1 h.
15. A Complete Collection of Tables for Navigation and Nautical Astronomy. With simple, concise and accurate methods for all the calculation useful at sea. Connaissance des Temps... pour l’an 1808 (1806): 443–447.
16. A Complete Collection of Tables for Navigation and Nautical Astronomy. With simple, concise and accurate methods for all the calculation useful at sea; particularly for deducing the longitude from lunar distance, and the latitude from lunar distance, and the latitude from two altitudes of the sun and the interval of time between the observations. 2nd ed. improved. London, T. Bensley, 1809. 4º, 6 p. + 1 h. + 604 p. + 58 p. + 1 h.
17. Tables for facilitating the calculation of nautical astronomy. London, 1812.
18. Forms for the ready calculation of the longitude... with the Tables published by Joseph de Mendoza Ríos. London, Black, Parry, & Co, 1814.4º, [76] + [2] p.

== Honors ==
Mendoza Cove in Antarctica is named after José de Mendoza y Ríos.

== See also ==
- Bowditch's American Practical Navigator
- Celestial navigation
- Haversine
- History of longitude
- Lunar distance (navigation)
- Marine sandglass
- Nautical almanac
- Navigational algorithms
- Sextant
- Reflecting instrument
