= Mendoza Cove =

Antarctic cove

Location of Elephant Island in the South Shetland Islands

Map of Elephant Island

Mendoza Cove (Bulgarian: залив Мендоса, romanized: zaliv Mendoza, IPA: ['zaliv mɛn'dɔsɐ]) is the 1.65 km (1.03 mi) wide cove indenting for 680 m (2,230 ft) the south coast of Elephant Island in the South Shetland Islands, Antarctica east of Muckle Bluff. It was formed as a result of the retreat of the island's ice cap in the late 20th century. The area was visited by early 19th century sealers.

The feature is named after José de Mendoza y Ríos (1761–1816), a Spanish astronomer and mathematician who redesigned the reflecting circle; in association with other names in the area deriving from the early development or use of geodetic instruments and methods.

== Location ==
Mendoza Cove is centred at 61°09′15″S 54°50′35″W, which is 7.7 km west of Walker Point. British mapping of the area in 1822,1972 and 2009.

== Maps ==
- Chart of South Shetland including Coronation Island, &c. from the exploration of the sloop Dove in the years 1821 and 1822 by George Powell Commander of the same. Scale ca. 1:200000. London: Laurie, 1822
- Elephant Island: From a survey by the Joint Services Expedition, December 1970. Scale 1:132000 topographic map. Royal Geographical Society (UK), 1972
- British Antarctic Territory. Scale 1:200000 topographic map. DOS 610 Series, Sheet W 61 54. Directorate of Overseas Surveys, Tolworth, UK, 1972
- South Shetland Islands: Elephant, Clarence and Gibbs Islands. Scale 1:220000 topographic map. UK Antarctic Place-names Committee, 2009
- Antarctic Digital Database (ADD). Scale 1:250000 topographic map of Antarctica. Scientific Committee on Antarctic Research (SCAR). Since 1993, regularly upgraded and updated
