= Lenoir Rock =

Rock in Antarctica

- Location of Smith Island in the South Shetland Islands

- Location within Antarctica Location within South Shetland Islands

Geography
- Location: Antarctica
- Coordinates: 62°56′54″S 62°33′04″W
- Archipelago: South Shetland Islands
- Area: 1.29 ha (3.2 acres)
- Length: 230 m (750 ft)
- Width: 85 m (279 ft)

Administration
- Administered under the Antarctic Treaty

Demographics
- Population: uninhabited

Topographic map of Smith Island

Lenoir Rock (Bulgarian: скала Леноар, romanized: skala Lenoir, IPA: [skɐˈla lɛnoˈɐr]) is the rock off the NW coast of Smith Island in the South Shetland Islands, Antarctica 230 m long in southwest–northeast direction and 85 m wide with a surface area of 1.29 ha. The vicinity was visited by early 19th century sealers.

The feature is named after Étienne Lenoir (1744–1832), a Belgian-French scientific instrument maker and inventor of the repeating circle; in association with other names in the area deriving from the early development or use of geodetic instruments and methods.

== Location ==
Lenoir Rock is located at 62°56′54″S 62°33′04″W, which is 380 m southwest of Jireček Point and 1.85 km northeast of Villagra Point. Bulgarian mapping in 2009 and 2017.

== See also ==
- List of Antarctic and subantarctic islands

== Maps ==
- L. Ivanov. Antarctica: Livingston Island and Greenwich, Robert, Snow and Smith Islands. Scale 1:120000 topographic map. Troyan: Manfred Wörner Foundation, 2010. ISBN 978-954-92032-9-5 (First edition 2009. ISBN 978-954-92032-6-4)
- South Shetland Islands: Smith and Low Islands. Scale 1:150000 topographic map No. 13677. British Antarctic Survey, 2009
- L. Ivanov. Antarctica: Livingston Island and Smith Island. Scale 1:100000 topographic map. Manfred Wörner Foundation, 2017. ISBN 978-619-90008-3-0
- Antarctic Digital Database (ADD). Scale 1:250000 topographic map of Antarctica. Scientific Committee on Antarctic Research (SCAR). Since 1993, regularly upgraded and updated
