= Louis Lefèvre‑Gineau =

French chemist, scientist and politician

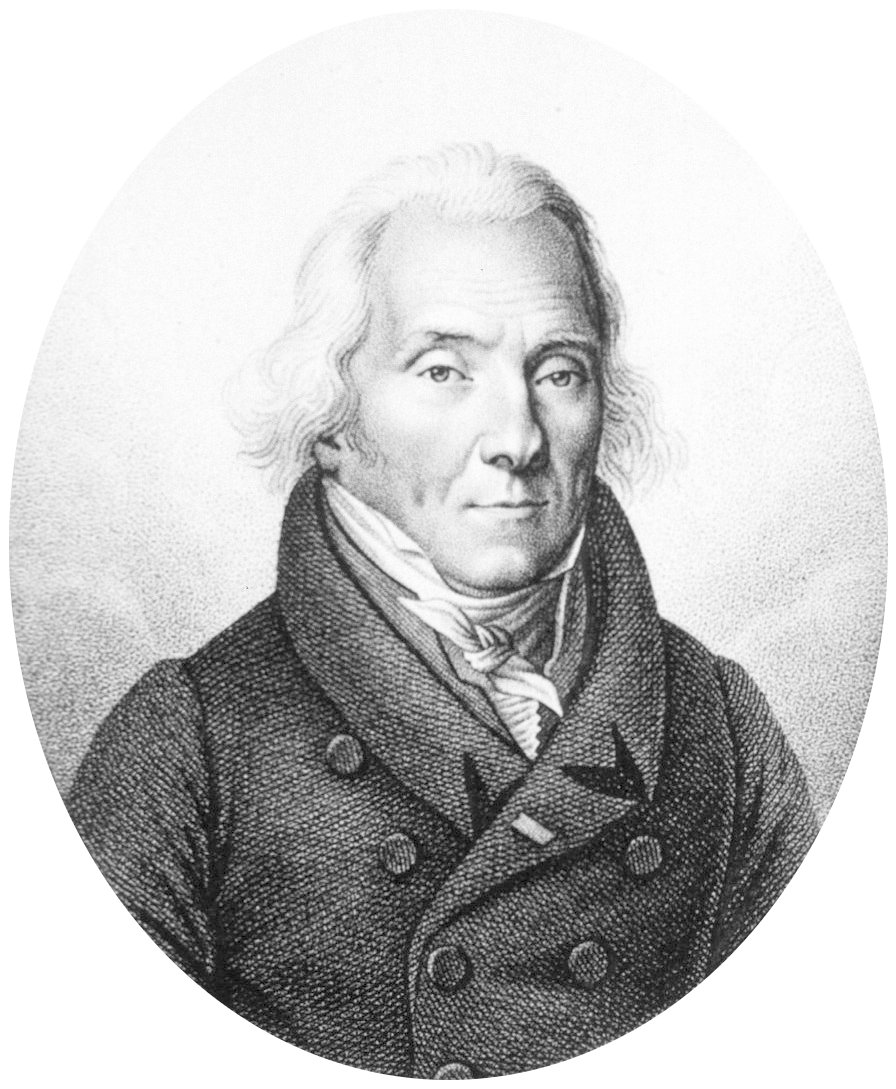
Louis Lefèvre-Gineau

Louis Lefèvre-Gineau (7 March 1751 – 3 February 1829), born at Authe (Ardennes), was a French chemist, scientist and politician.

Of modest origins, he was raised by his uncle l'abbé Meslier, curate of Étrépigny, and became a mathematics teacher for the children of the Baron de Breteuil.

Beginning work with Lavoisier, he studied with him the chemical composition of water. A Deputy under the French Revolution, he was a member of the commission charged to define the metric system and to determine the mass of the kilogram.

From 1788 to 1823, he occupied the chair in mechanics, then general and experimental physics, at the Collège de France, where he was the administrator from 1801 to 1823. He was made a member of the Académie des sciences in 1795. He was appointed inspector-general of education (inspecteur général des études) in 1803, inspector-general of the university in 1808, and inspector-general of the University of Paris in 1815.

Lefèvre-Gineau was a member of the Chamber of Deputies from 17 February 1807 to 4 June 1814 (Corps législatif), 4 June 1814 to 20 March 1815 (First Restoration), 10 May 1815 to 13 July 1815 (Chamber of Representatives, Hundred Days), 4 November 1820 to 24 December 1823 (Second Restoration, second legislature), and 17 November 1827 to 3 February 1829 (Second Restoration, fourth legislature). He was made a Chevalier d'Ainelle under Napoleon's Empire, in 1808.
