= Repeating circle =

Type of angular measurement instrument

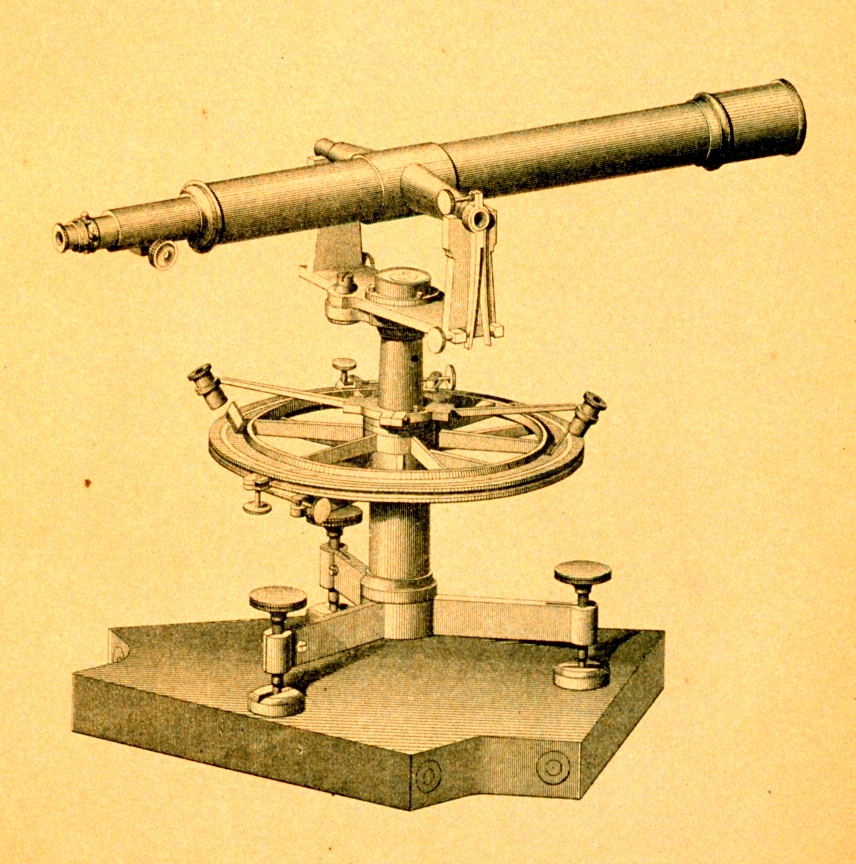
12-inch repeating circle.

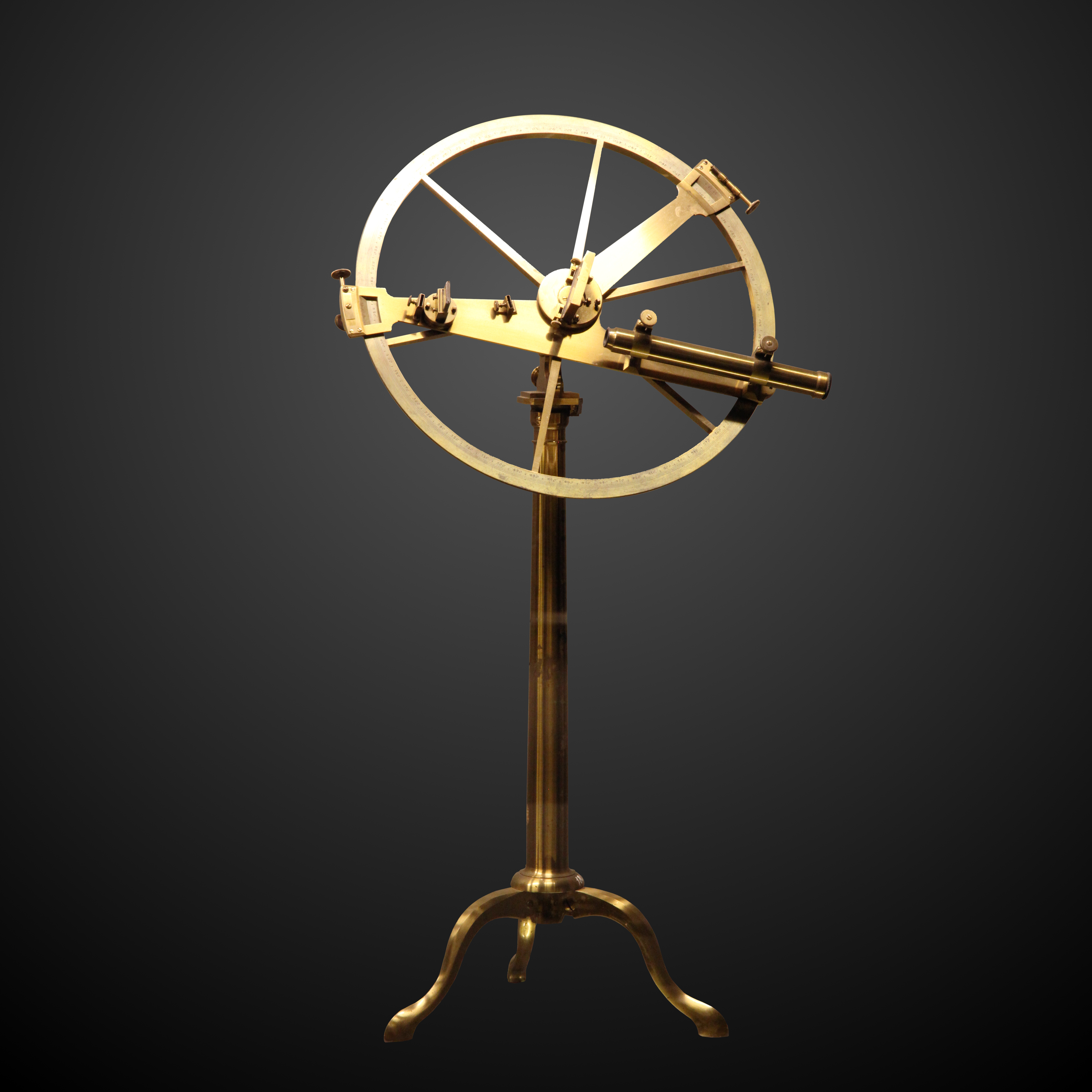
Borda reflecting circle, on display at Conservatoire national des arts et métiers.

The repeating circle is an instrument for geodetic surveying, developed from the reflecting circle by Étienne Lenoir in 1784. He invented it while an assistant of Jean-Charles de Borda, who later improved the instrument. It was notable as being the equal of the great theodolite created by the renowned instrument maker, Jesse Ramsden. It was used to measure the meridian arc from Dunkirk to Barcelona by Jean Baptiste Delambre and Pierre Méchain (see: meridian arc of Delambre and Méchain).

== Construction and operation ==
The repeating circle is made of two telescopes mounted on a shared axis with scales to measure the angle between the two. The instrument combines multiple measurements to increase accuracy with the following procedure:

Mode of operation: (1) The instrument is aligned so its plane includes the two points to be measured, and each telescope is aimed at a point; (2) Keeping the angle between the telescopes locked, the left (black) telescope is rotated clockwise to aim at the right point; (3) the right (gray) telescope's position is noted, and it is rotated back to the left point.

At this stage, the angle on the instrument is double the angle of interest between the points. Repeating the procedure causes the instrument to show 4× the angle of interest, with further iterations increasing it to 6×, 8×, and so on. In this way, many measurements can be added together, allowing some of the random measurement errors to cancel out.

== Use in geodetic surveys ==
The repeating circle was used by César-François Cassini de Thury, assisted by Pierre Méchain, for the triangulation of the Anglo-French Survey. It would later be used for the Arc measurement of Delambre and Méchain as improvements in the measuring device designed by Borda and used for this survey also raised hopes for a more accurate determination of the length of the French meridian arc.

When the metre was chosen as an international unit of length, it was well known that by measuring the latitude of two stations in Barcelona, Méchain had found that the difference between these latitudes was greater than predicted by direct measurement of distance by triangulation and that he did not dare to admit this inaccuracy. This was later explained by clearance in the central axis of the repeating circle causing wear and consequently the zenith measurements contained significant systematic errors.

== See also ==
- Reflecting circles
- Meridional definition
- Grade (angle)
