= Arc measurement =

Technique of determining the radius of Earth

Arc measurement of Eratosthenes

Arc measurement, sometimes called degree measurement (German: Gradmessung), is the astrogeodetic technique of determining the radius of Earth and, by extension, its circumference. More specifically, it seeks to determine the local Earth radius of curvature of the figure of the Earth, by relating the latitude difference (sometimes also the longitude difference) and the geographic distance (arc length) surveyed between two locations on Earth's surface. The most common variant involves only astronomical latitudes and the meridian arc length and is called meridian arc measurement; other variants may involve only astronomical longitude (parallel arc measurement) or both geographic coordinates (oblique arc measurement). Arc measurement campaigns in Europe were the precursors to the International Association of Geodesy (IAG). Nowadays, the method is replaced by worldwide geodetic networks and by satellite geodesy.

== History ==
The first known arc measurement was performed by Eratosthenes (240 BC) between Alexandria and Syene in what is now Egypt, determining the radius of the Earth with remarkable correctness. In the early 8th century, Yi Xing performed a similar survey.

The French physician Jean Fernel measured the arc in 1528. The Dutch geodesist Snellius (~1620) repeated the experiment between Alkmaar and Bergen op Zoom using more modern geodetic instrumentation (Snellius' triangulation).

Later arc measurements aimed at determining the flattening of the Earth ellipsoid by measuring at different geographic latitudes. The first of these was the French Geodesic Mission, commissioned by the French Academy of Sciences in 1735–1738, involving measurement expeditions to Lapland (Maupertuis et al.) and Peru (Pierre Bouguer et al.).

Friedrich Struve measured a geodetic control network via triangulation between the Arctic Sea and the Black Sea, the Struve Geodetic Arc.

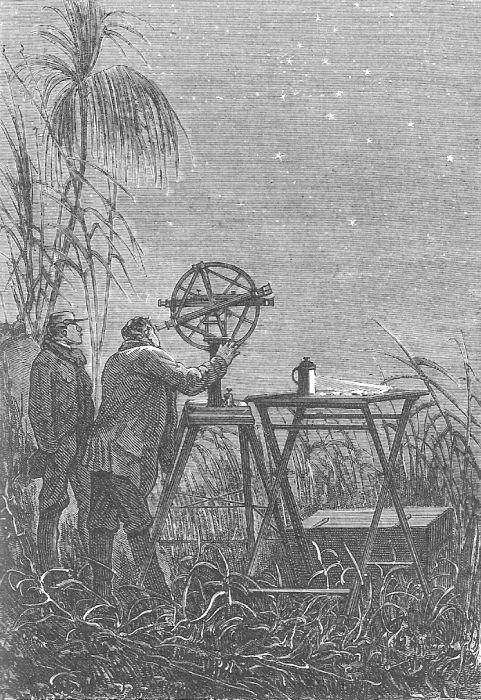
Imaginary arc measurement described by Jules Verne in his book The Adventures of Three Englishmen and Three Russians in South Africa (1872)

=== Chronological list ===
This is a partial chronological list of arc measurements:

- 230 B.C.: Eratosthenes' arc measurement
- 100 B.C.: Posidonius' arc measurement
- 724 AD: Yi Xing's arc measurement
- 827 A.D.: Al-Ma'mun's arc measurement
- 1528: Fernel's arc measurement
- 1617: Snellius' survey
- 1633-1635: Norwood's arc measurement
- 1658: Riccioli and Grimaldi's arc measurement
- 1669: Picard's arc measurement
- 1684-1718: Dunkirk-Collioure arc measurement (Cassini, Cassini, and de La Hire)
- 1736-1737: French Geodesic Mission to Lapland
- 1735-1739: French Geodesic Mission to the Equator
- 1740: Dunkirk-Collioure arc measurement (Cassini de Thury and de Lacaille)
- 1750-1751: Maire and Boscovich's arc measurement
- 1752: De Lacaille's arc measurement
- 1791-1853: Principal Triangulation of Great Britain
- 1792-1798: meridian arc of Delambre and Méchain
- 1802–1841: Great Trigonometric Survey of India
- 1806-1809: Arago and Biot's arc measurement
- 1816-1855: Struve Geodetic Arc
- 1821-1825: Gauss' geodetic survey
- 1841-1848: Maclear's arc measurement
- 1879: West Europe-Africa Meridian-arc
- 1899-1902: Swedish–Russian Arc-of-Meridian Expedition
- 1921: Hopfner's arc measurement

== Determination ==
Assume the astronomic latitudes of two endpoints, $\phi_s$ (standpoint) and $\phi_f$ (forepoint) are known; these can be determined by astrogeodesy, observing the zenith distances of sufficient numbers of stars (meridian altitude method).

Then, the empirical Earth's meridional radius of curvature at the midpoint of the meridian arc can then be determined inverting the great-circle distance (or circular arc length) formula:

$$R = \frac{\mathit{\Delta}'}{\vert\phi_s - \phi_f\vert}$$

where the latitudes are in radians and $\mathit{\Delta}'$ is the arc length on mean sea level (MSL).

Historically, the distance between two places has been determined at low precision by pacing or odometry.

High precision land surveys can be used to determine the distance between two places at nearly the same longitude by measuring a baseline and a triangulation network linking fixed points. The meridian distance $\mathit{\Delta}$ from one end point to a fictitious point at the same latitude as the second end point is then calculated by trigonometry. The surface distance $\mathit{\Delta}$ is reduced to the corresponding distance at MSL, $\mathit{\Delta}'$ (see: Geographical distance#Altitude correction).

== Extensions ==
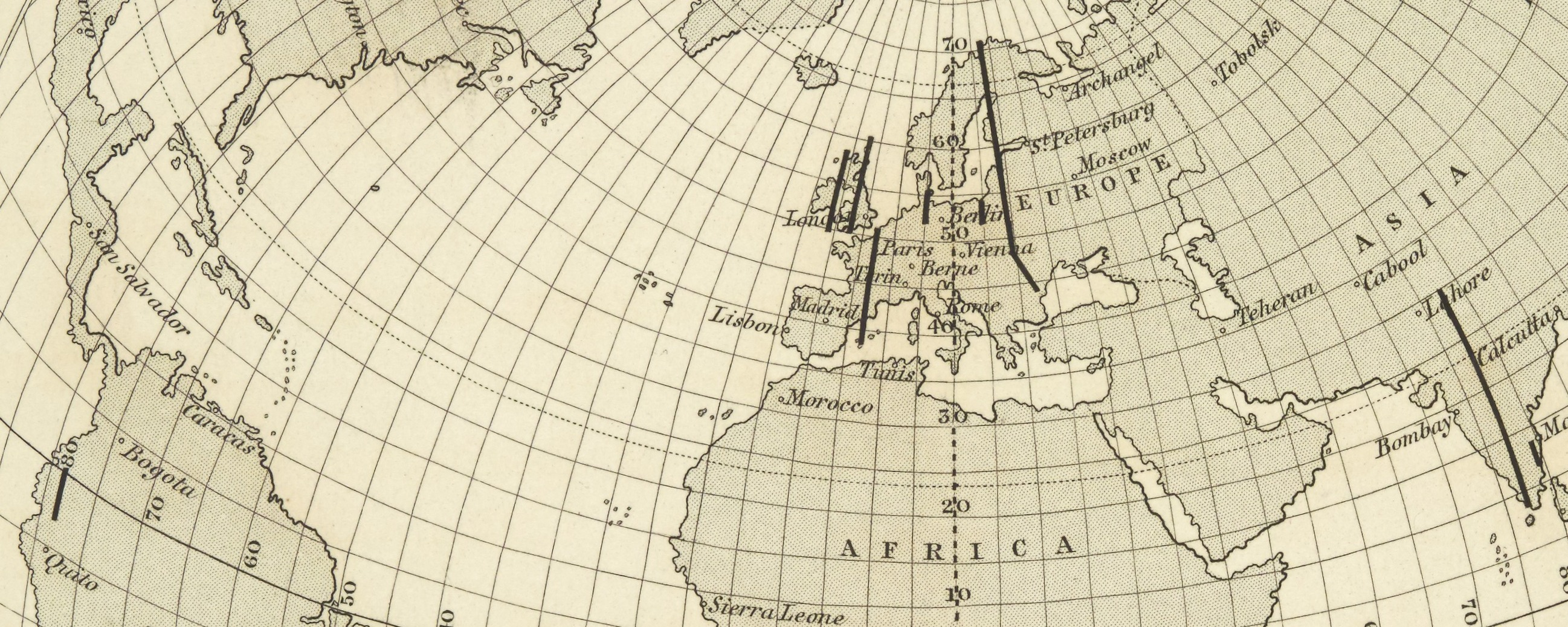
Arc measurements used in Clarke's Figure of the Earth, 1858

Additional arc measurements, at different latitudinal bands (each delimited by a new pair of standpoint and forepoint), serve to determine Earth's flattening. Bessel compiled several meridian arcs, to compute the famous Bessel ellipsoid (1841). Clarke (1858) combined most of the arc measurements then available to define a new reference ellipsoid.

== See also ==
- Astrogeodesy
- Central European Arc Measurement
- Earth ellipsoid
- Geodesy
- Gradian § Relation to the metre
- History of geodesy
  - Spherical Earth § History
  - Meridian arc § History
  - Earth's circumference § History
- Meridian arc
- Paris Meridian
