= Étienne Lenoir (instrument maker) =

Étienne Lenoir (1 March 1744, Loir-et-Cher – 18 August 1832, Paris) was a French scientific instrument maker and inventor of the repeating circle.

When hired by Jean-Charles de Borda around 1772 to work on the reflecting circle, he was about thirty years old and nearly illiterate. However, his intelligence and mechanical genius allowed him to perform work that few others could perform. He played a significant role in the improvements to the reflecting circle and later used this experience in inventing the repeating circle. As a result of this work, he became known as the pre-eminent maker of instruments for astronomy, navigation and surveying in France.

In 1787, the king of France appointed him certificated engineer to the king. He created the instruments used on all the major French geodetic surveying projects and major naval expeditions of the time.

He worked primarily for the Commission des Poids et Mesures (Weights and Measures Commission) after 1792 and for the Commission du Metre (Metre Commission - for the determination of the metric unit of length, the metre). For these commissions, he produced the instruments used to measure the meridian arc and created the platinum rules for baseline measurements. In 1793, he made and signed the provisional standard brass metre. He also invented a comparator for the measurement of the definitive standard metre.

Lenoir was also a member of the Commission temporaire des Arts (1793–1794). He was made a member of the Bureau des Longitudes in 1814 and received the Legion of Honour.

His son, Paul-Etienne Lenoir, followed in his footsteps, taking over his workshop around 1815 and continuing his work after Lenoir senior's death.

Instruments made by Lenoir
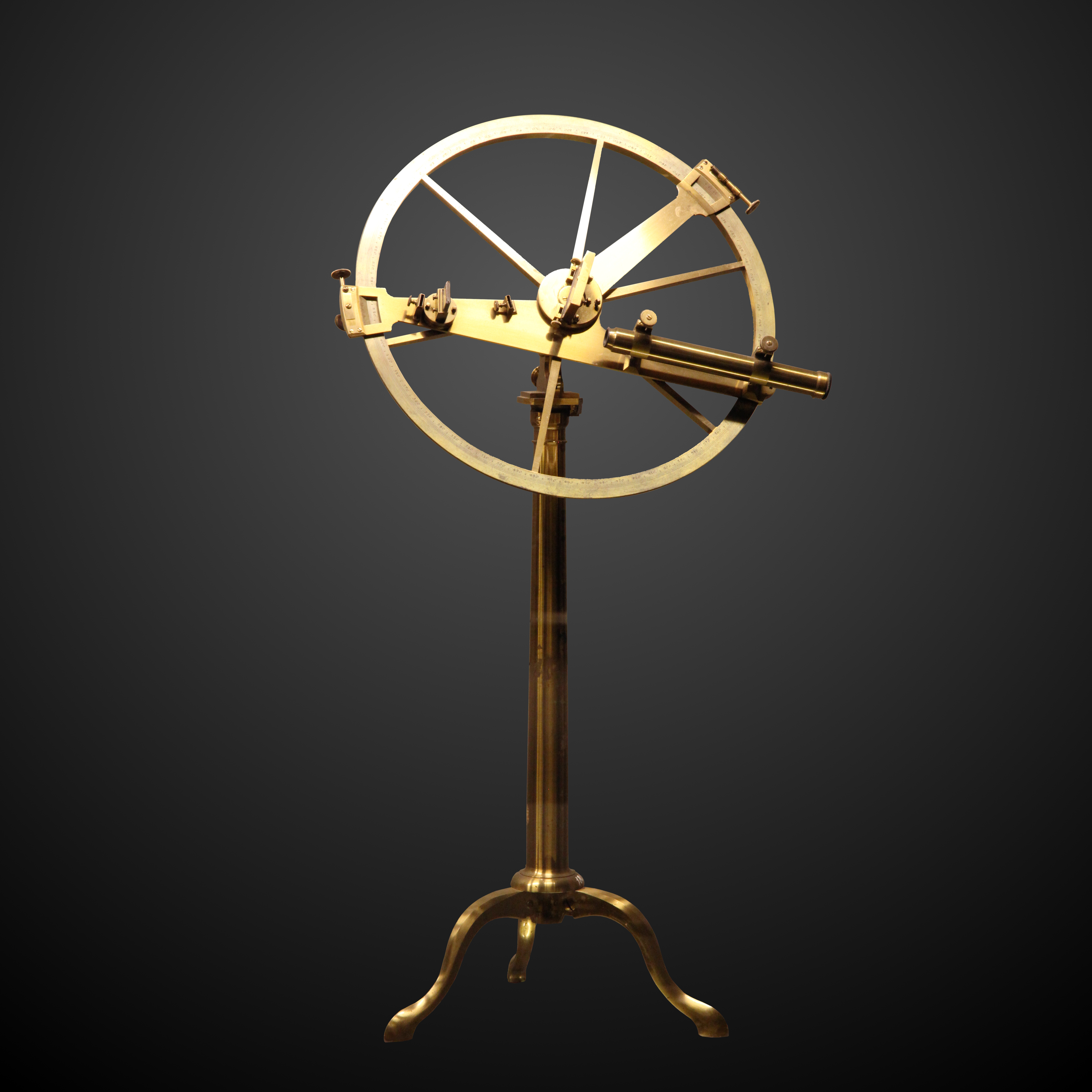
Reflecting circle by Étienne Lenoir, Paris, 1775, on display at Musée des Arts et Métiers

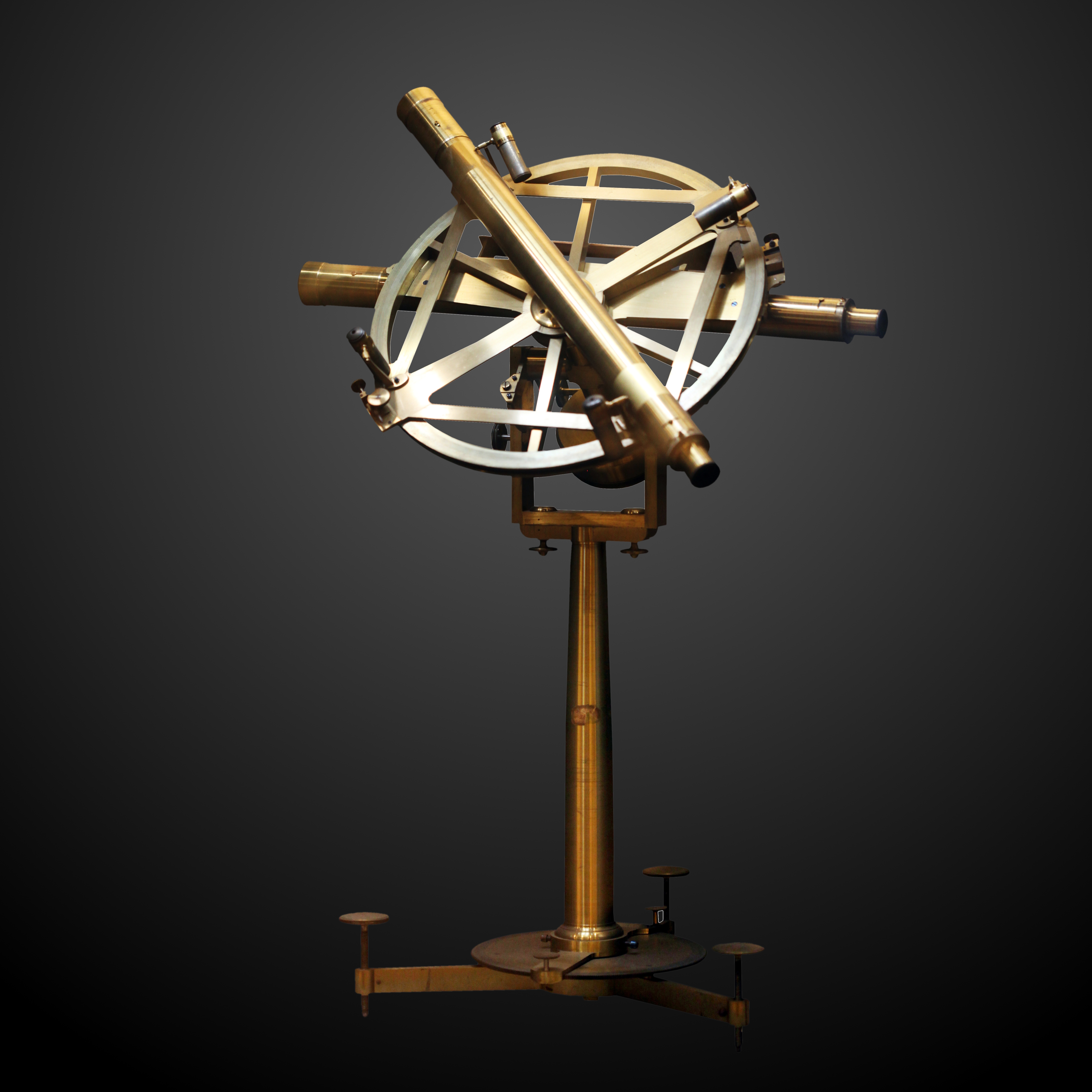
Repeating circle by Étienne Lenoir, Paris, 1805, on display at Musée des Arts et Métiers

== Honours ==
Lenoir Rock in Antarctica is named after Étienne Lenoir.
