= Reflecting instrument =

Class of navigational instruments

Reflecting instruments are those that use mirrors to enhance their ability to make measurements. In particular, the use of mirrors permits one to observe two objects simultaneously while measuring the angular distance between the objects. While reflecting instruments are used in many professions, they are primarily associated with celestial navigation as the need to solve navigation problems, in particular the problem of the longitude, was the primary motivation in their development.

== Objectives of the instruments ==
The purpose of reflecting instruments is to allow an observer to measure the altitude of a celestial object or the angular distance between two objects. The driving force behind the developments discussed here was the solution to the problem of finding one's longitude at sea. The solution to this problem was seen to require an accurate means of measuring angles and the accuracy was seen to rely on the observer's ability to measure this angle by simultaneously observing two objects.

The deficiency of prior instruments was well known. Requiring the observer to observe two objects with two divergent lines of sight increased the likelihood of an error. Those that considered the problem realized that the use of specula (mirrors in modern parlance) could permit two objects to be observed in a single view. What followed is a series of inventions and improvements that refined the instrument to the point that its accuracy exceeded that which was required for determining longitude. Any further improvements required a completely new technology.

== Early reflecting instruments ==
Some of the early reflecting instruments were proposed by scientists such as Robert Hooke and Isaac Newton. These were little used or may not have been built or tested extensively. The van Breen instrument was the exception, in that it was used by the Dutch. However, it had little influence outside of the Netherlands.

=== Joost van Breen's reflecting cross-staff ===
Invented in 1660 by the Dutch Joost van Breen, the spiegelboog (mirror-bow) was a reflecting cross staff. This instrument appears to have been used for approximately 100 years, mainly in the Zeeland Chamber of the VOC (The Dutch East India Company).

=== Robert Hooke's single-reflecting instrument ===
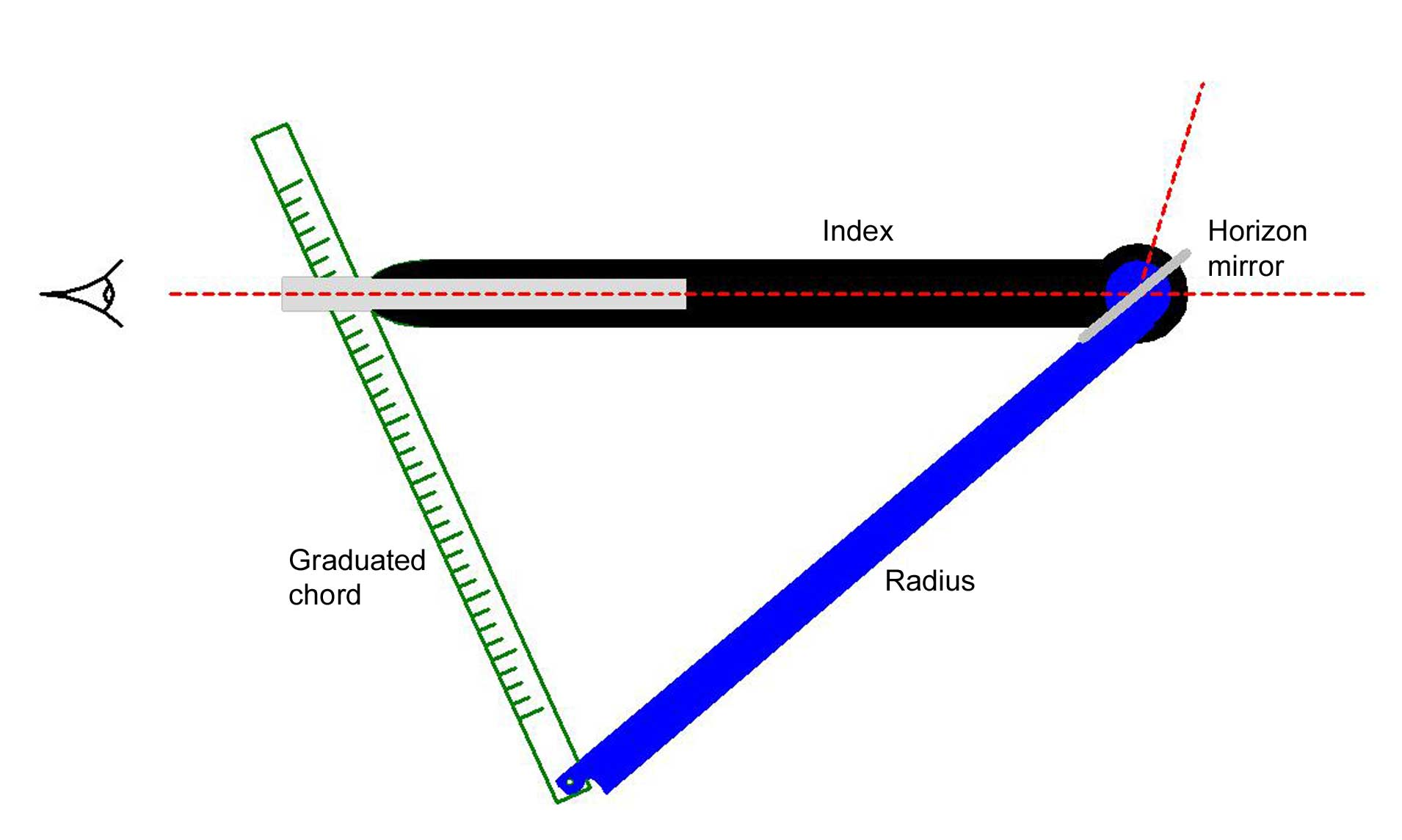
Representative drawing of Robert Hooke's reflecting instrument. It does not accurately depict the fine details of the instrument but rather the basic functionality. The index with telescope mounted is shown in black, the radius arm with the mirror (grey) attached in blue and the chord in green on white. The lines of sight are represented by the red dashed line.

Hooke's instrument was a single-reflecting instrument. It used a single mirror to reflect the image of an astronomical object to the observer's eye. This instrument was first described in 1666 and a working model was presented by Hooke at a meeting of the Royal Society some time later.

The device consisted of three primary components, an index arm, a radial arm and a graduated chord. The three were arranged in a triangle as in the image on the right. A telescopic sight was mounted on the index arm. At the point of rotation of the radial arm, a single mirror was mounted. This point of rotation allowed the angle between the index arm and the radial arm to be changed. The graduated chord was connected to the opposite end of the radial arm and the chord was permitted to rotate about the end. The chord was held against the distant end of the index arm and slid against it. The graduations on the chord were uniform and, by using it to measure the distance between the ends of the index arm and the radial arm, the angle between those arms could be determined. A table of chords was used to convert a measurement of distance to a measurement of angle. The use of the mirror resulted in the measured angle being twice the angle included by the index and the radius arm.

The mirror on the radial arm was small enough that the observer could see the reflection of an object in half the telescope's view while seeing straight ahead in the other half. This allowed the observer to see both objects at once. Aligning the two objects together in the telescopes view resulted in the angular distance between them to be represented on the graduated chord.

While Hooke's instrument was novel and attracted some attention at the time, there is no evidence that it was subjected to any tests at sea. The instrument was little used and did not have any significant effect on astronomy or navigation.

=== Halley's reflecting instrument ===
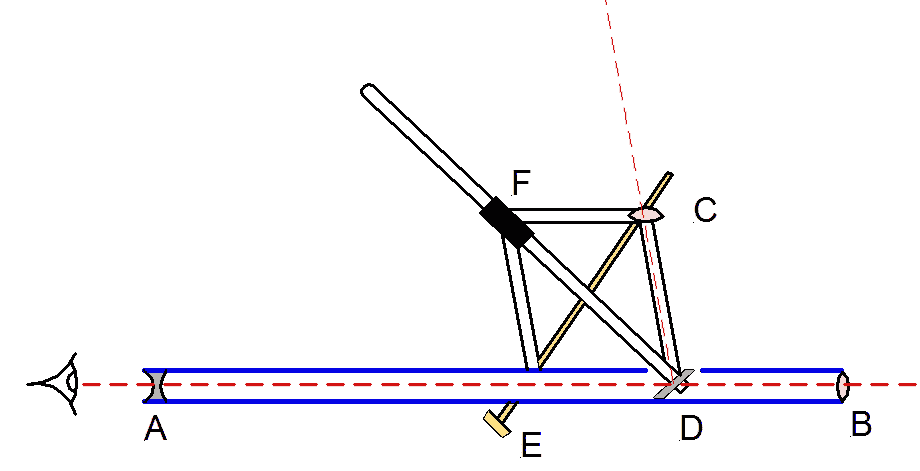
A drawing of Halley's reflecting instrument. The telescope is represented by the blue lines (as if cut open) and the mirrors and lenses are grey. The red dashed lines represent lines of sight.

In 1692, Edmond Halley presented the design of a reflecting instrument to the Royal Society.

This is an interesting instrument, combining the functionality of a radio latino with a double telescope. The telescope (AB in the adjacent image), has an eyepiece at one end and a mirror (D) partway along its length with one objective lens at the far end (B). The mirror only obstructs half the field (either left or right) and permits the objective to be seen on the other. Reflected in the mirror is the image from the second objective lens (C). This permits the observer to see both images, one straight through and one reflected, simultaneously besides each other. It is essential that the focal lengths of the two objective lenses be the same and that the distances from the mirror to either lens be identical. If this condition is not met, the two images cannot be brought to a common focus.

The mirror is mounted on the staff (DF) of the radio latino portion of the instrument and rotates with it. The angle this side of the radio latino's rhombus makes to the telescope can be set by adjusting the rhombus' diagonal length. In order to facilitate this and allow for fine adjustment of the angle, a screw (EC) is mounted so as to allow the observer to change the distance between the two vertexes (E and C).

The observer sights the horizon with the direct lens' view and sights a celestial object in the mirror. Turning the screw to bring the two images directly adjacent sets the instrument. The angle is determined by taking the length of the screw between E and C and converting this to an angle in a table of chords.

Halley specified that the telescope tube be rectangular in cross section. This makes construction easy, but is not a requirement as other cross section shapes can be accommodated. The four sides of the radio latino portion (CD, DE, EF, FC) must be equal in length in order for the angle between the telescope and the objective lens side (ADC) to be precisely twice the angle between the telescope and the mirror (ADF) (or in other words – to enforce the angle of incidence being equal to the angle of reflection). Otherwise, instrument collimation will be compromised and the resulting measurements would be in error.

The celestial object's elevation angle could have been determined by reading from graduations on the staff at the slider, however, that's not how Halley designed the instrument. This may suggest that the overall design of the instrument was coincidentally like a radio latino and that Halley may not have been familiar with that instrument.

There is no knowledge of whether this instrument was ever tested at sea.

=== Newton's reflecting quadrant ===
Newton's reflecting quadrant was similar in many respects to Hadley's first reflecting quadrant that followed it.

Newton had communicated the design to Edmund Halley around 1699. However, Halley did not do anything with the document and it remained in his papers only to be discovered after his death. However, Halley did discuss Newton's design with members of the Royal Society when Hadley presented his reflecting quadrant in 1731. Halley noted that Hadley's design was quite similar to the earlier Newtonian instrument.

As a result of this inadvertent secrecy, Newton's invention played little role in the development of reflecting instruments.

== The octant ==
What is remarkable about the octant is the number of persons who independently invented the device in a short period of time. John Hadley and Thomas Godfrey both get credit for inventing the octant. They independently developed the same instrument around 1731. They were not the only ones, however.

In Hadley's case, two instruments were designed. The first was an instrument very similar to Newton's reflecting quadrant. The second had essentially the same form as the modern sextant. Few of the first design were constructed, while the second became the standard instrument from which the sextant derived and, along with the sextant, displaced all prior navigation instruments used for celestial navigation.

Caleb Smith, an English insurance broker with a strong interest in astronomy, had created an octant in 1734. He called it an Astroscope or Sea-Quadrant. He used a fixed prism in addition to an index mirror to provide reflective elements. Prisms provide advantages over mirrors in an era when polished speculum metal mirrors were inferior and both the silvering of a mirror and the production of glass with flat, parallel surfaces was difficult. However, the other design elements of Smith's instrument made it inferior to Hadley's octant and it was not used significantly.

Jean-Paul Fouchy, a mathematics professor and astronomer in France, invented an octant in 1732. His was essentially the same as Hadley's. Fouchy did not know of the developments in England at the time, since communications between the two country's instrument makers was limited and the publications of the Royal Society, particularly the Philosophical Transactions, were not being distributed in France. Fouchy's octant was overshadowed by Hadley's.

== The sextant ==
The main article, Sextant, covers the use of the instrument in navigation. This article concentrates on the history and the development of the instrument

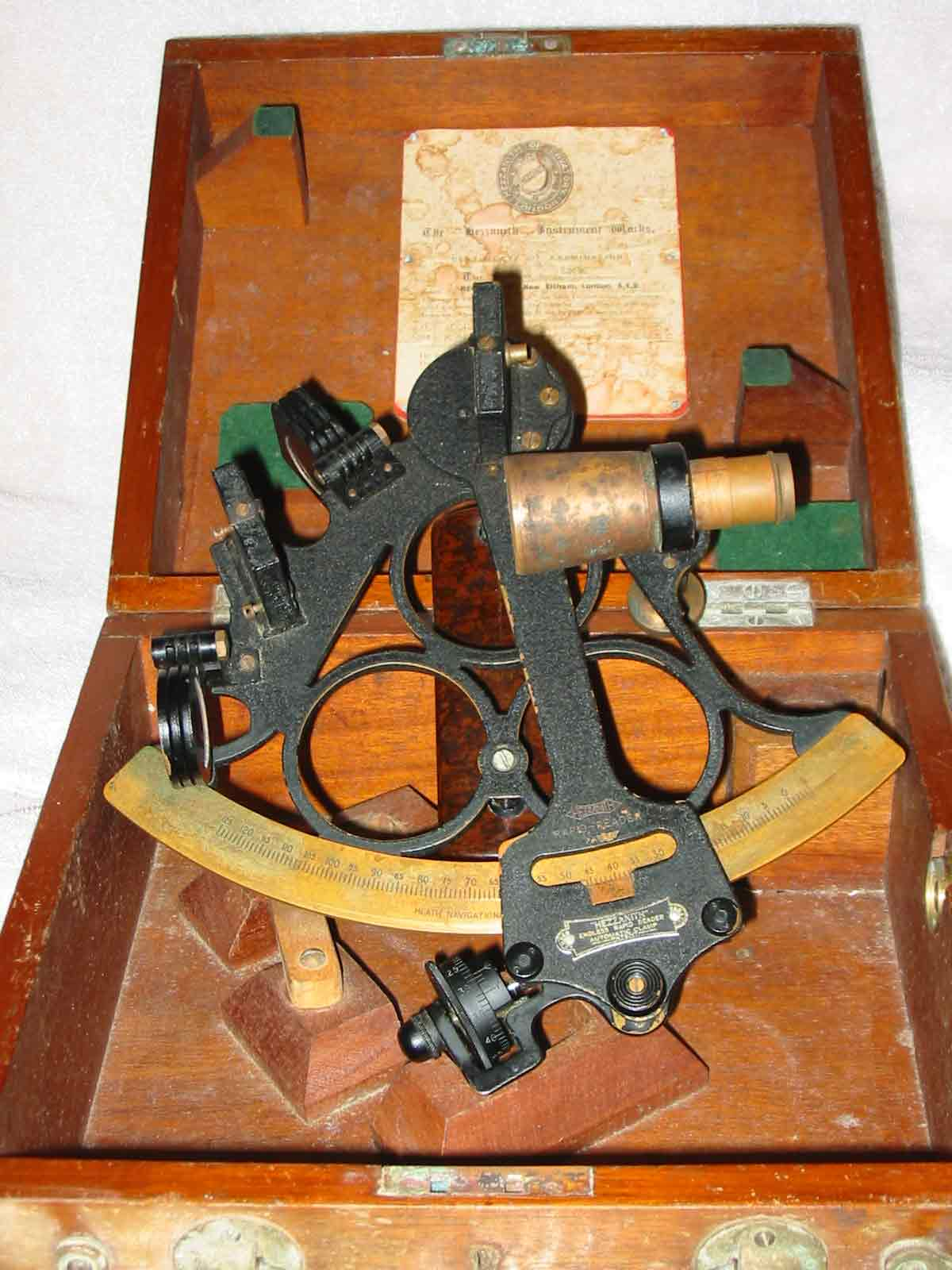
A sextant that has been used for over a half century. This frame shows one standard design – that with three rings. This is one design that has been used to avoid thermal expansion problems while retaining adequate stiffness.

The origin of the sextant is straightforward and not in dispute. Admiral John Campbell, having used Hadley's octant in sea trials of the method of lunar distances, found that it was wanting. The 90° angle subtended by the arc of the instrument was insufficient to measure some of the angular distances required for the method. He suggested that the angle be increased to 120°, yielding the sextant. John Bird made the first such sextant in 1757.

With the development of the sextant, the octant became something of a second class instrument. The octant, while occasionally constructed entirely of brass, remained primarily a wooden-framed instrument. Most of the developments in advanced materials and construction techniques were reserved for the sextant.

There are examples of sextants made with wood, however most are made from brass. In order to ensure the frame was stiff, instrument makers used thicker frames. This had a drawback in making the instrument heavier, which could influence the accuracy due to hand-shaking as the navigator worked against its weight. In order to avoid this problem, the frames were modified. Edward Troughton patented the double-framed sextant in 1788. This used two frames held in parallel with spacers. The two frames were about a centimetre apart. This significantly increased the stiffness of the frame. An earlier version had a second frame that only covered the upper part of the instrument, securing the mirrors and telescope. Later versions used two full frames. Since the spacers looked like little pillars, these were also called pillar sextants.

Troughton also experimented with alternative materials. The scales were plated with silver, gold or platinum. Gold and platinum both minimized corrosion problems. The platinum-plated instruments were expensive, due to the scarcity of the metal, though less expensive than gold. Troughton knew William Hyde Wollaston through the Royal Society and this gave him access to the precious metal. Instruments from Troughton's company that used platinum can be easily identified by the word Platina engraved on the frame. These instruments remain highly valued as collector's items and are as accurate today as when they were constructed.

As the developments in dividing engines progressed, the sextant was more accurate and could be made smaller. In order to permit easy reading of the vernier, a small magnifying lens was added. In addition, to reduce glare on the frame, some had a diffuser surrounding the magnifier to soften the light. As accuracy increased, the circular arc vernier was replaced with a drum vernier.

Frame designs were modified over time to create a frame that would not be adversely affected by temperature changes. These frame patterns became standardized and one can see the same general shape in many instruments from many different manufacturers.

In order to control costs, modern sextants are now available in precision-made plastic. These are light, affordable and of high quality.

== Types of sextants ==
While most people think of navigation when they hear the term sextant, the instrument has been used in other professions.

Navigator's sextant
The common type of instrument most people think of when they hear the term sextant.
Sounding sextants
These are sextants that were constructed for use horizontally rather than vertically and were developed for use in hydrographic surveys.
Surveyor's sextants
These were constructed for use exclusively on land for horizontal angular measurements. Instead of a handle on the frame, they had a socket to allow the attachment of a surveyor's Jacob's staff.
Box or pocket sextants
These are small sextants entirely contained within a metal case. First developed by Edward Troughton, they are usually all brass with most of the mechanical components inside the case. The telescope extends from an opening in the side. The index and other parts are completely covered when the case cover is slipped on. Popular with surveyors for their small size (typically only 6.5–8 cm [2 1/2–3 1/4 in] in diameter and 5 cm [2 in] deep), their accuracy was enabled by improvements in the dividing engines used to graduate the arcs. The arcs are so small that magnifiers are attached to allow them to be read.

In addition to these types, there are terms used for various sextants.

A pillar sextant can be either:

1. A double-frame sextant as patented by Edward Troughton in 1788.
2. A surveyor's sextant with a socket for a surveyor's staff (the pillar).

The former is the most common use of the term.

== Beyond the sextant ==
=== Quintant and others ===
Several makers offered instruments with sizes other than one-eighth or one-sixth of a circle. One of the most common was the quintant or fifth of a circle (72° arc reading to 144°). Other sizes were also available, but the odd sizes never became common. Many instruments are found with scales reading to, for example, 135°, but they are simply referred to as sextants. Similarly, there are 100° octants, but these are not separated as unique types of instruments.

There was interest in much larger instruments for special purposes. In particular a number of full circle instruments were made, categorized as reflecting circles and repeating circles.

=== Reflecting circles ===
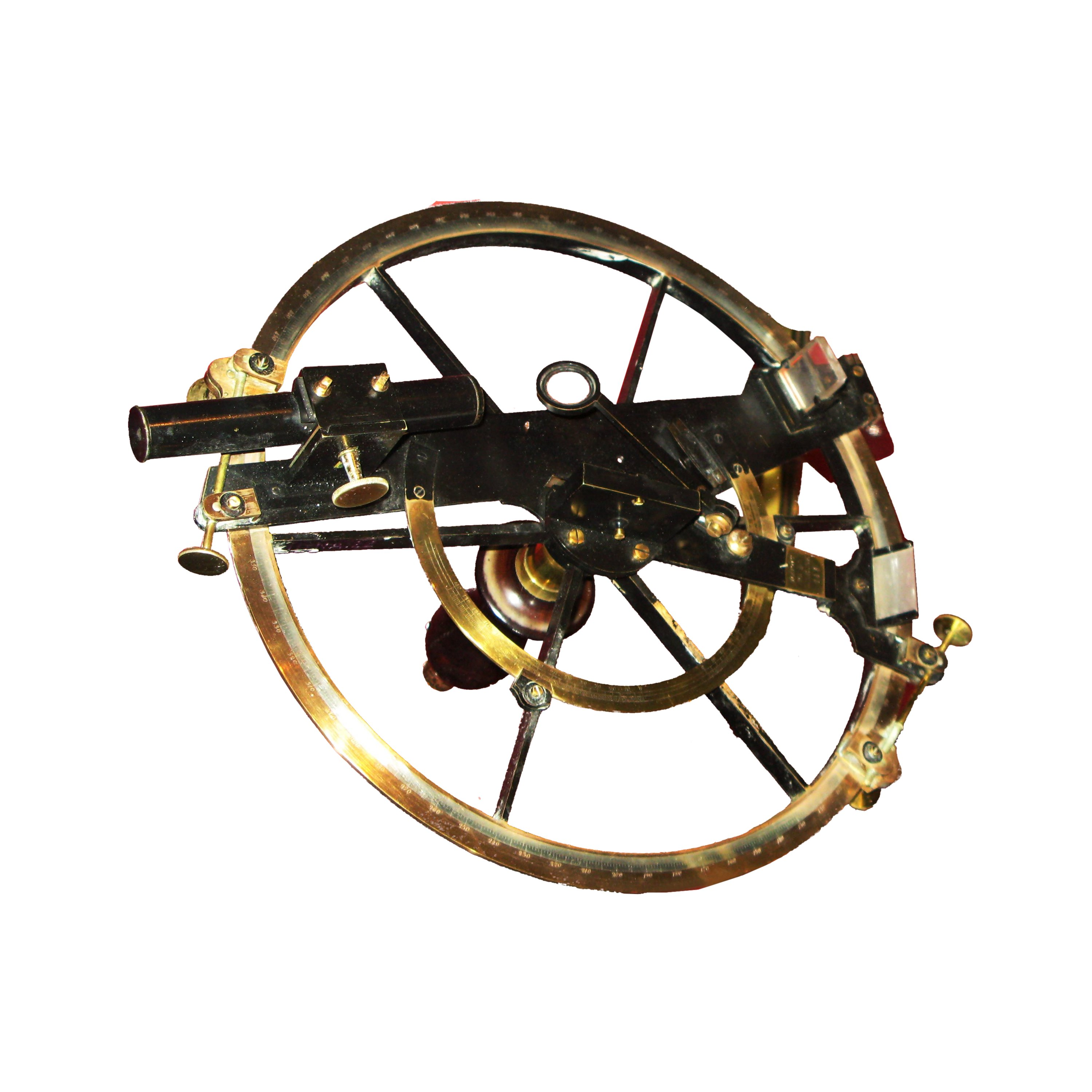
Borda's reflecting circle, on display at Toulon naval museum

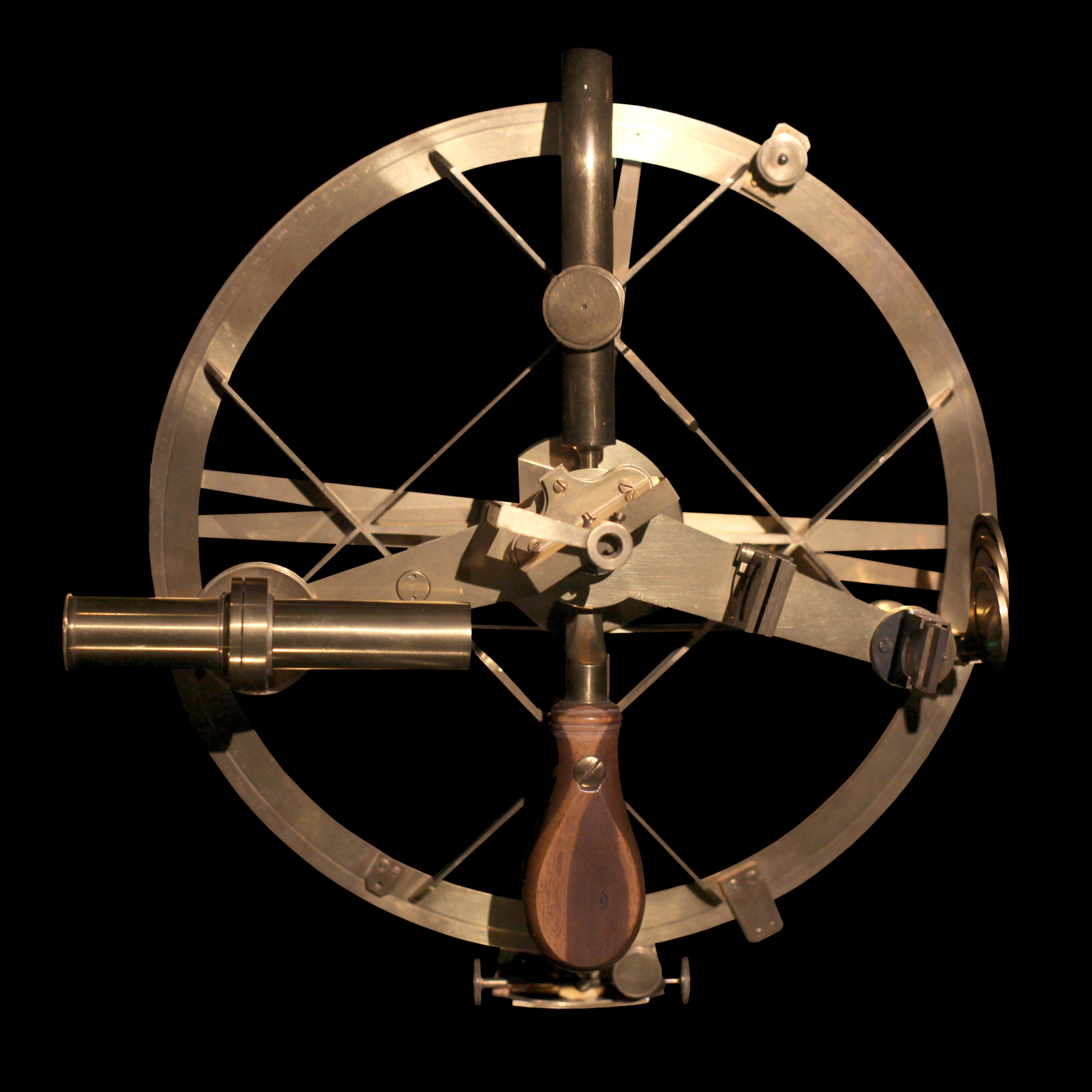
Mendoça's reflecting circle on display at the Musée national de la Marine.

The reflecting circle was invented by the German geometer and astronomer Tobias Mayer in 1752, with details published in 1767. His development preceded the sextant and was motivated by the need to create a superior surveying instrument.

The reflecting circle is a complete circular instrument graduated to 720° (to measure distances between heavenly bodies, there is no need to read an angle greater than 180°, since the minimum distance will always be less than 180°). Mayer presented a detailed description of this instrument to the Board of Longitude and John Bird used the information to construct one sixteen inches in diameter for evaluation by the Royal Navy. This instrument was one of those used by Admiral John Campbell during his evaluation of the lunar distance method. It differed in that it was graduated to 360° and was so heavy that it was fitted with a support that attached to a belt. It was not considered better than the Hadley octant and was less convenient to use. As a result, Campbell recommended the construction of the sextant.

Jean-Charles de Borda further developed the reflecting circle. He modified the position of the telescopic sight in such a way that the mirror could be used to receive an image from either side relative to the telescope. This eliminated the need to ascertain that the mirrors were precisely parallel when reading zero. This simplified the use of the instrument. Further refinements were performed with the help of Etienne Lenoir. The two of them refined the instrument to its definitive form in 1777. This instrument was so distinctive it was given the name Borda circle or repeating circle. Borda and Lenoir developed the instrument for geodetic surveying. Since it was not used for the celestial measures, it did not use double reflection and substituted two telescope sights. As such, it was not a reflecting instrument. It was notable as being the equal of the great theodolite created by the renowned instrument maker, Jesse Ramsden.

Josef de Mendoza y Ríos redesigned Borda's reflecting circle (London, 1801). The goal was to use it together with his Lunar Tables published by the Royal Society (London, 1805). He made a design with two concentric circles and a vernier scale and recommended averaging three sequential readings to reduce the error. Borda's system was not based on a circle of 360° but 400 grads (Borda spent years calculating his tables with a circle divided in 400°). Mendoza's lunar tables have been used through almost the entire nineteenth century (see Lunar distance (navigation)).

Edward Troughton also modified the reflecting circle. He created a design with three index arms and verniers. This permitted three simultaneous readings to average out the error.

As a navigation instrument, the reflecting circle was more popular with the French navy than with the British.

=== Bris sextant ===
The Bris sextant is not a true sextant, but it is a true reflecting instrument based on the principle of double reflection and subject to the same rules and errors as common octants and sextants. Unlike common octants and sextants, the Bris sextant is a fixed angle instrument capable of accurately measuring a few specific angles unlike other reflecting instruments which can measure any angle within the range of the instrument. It is particularly suited to determining the altitude of the sun or moon.

=== Surveying sector ===
Francis Ronalds invented an instrument for recording angles in 1829 by modifying the octant. A disadvantage of reflecting instruments in surveying applications is that optics dictate that the mirror and index arm rotate through half the angular separation of the two objects. The angle thus needs to be read, noted and a protractor employed to draw the angle on a plan. Ronalds' idea was to configure the index arm to rotate through twice the angle of the mirror, so that the arm could then be used to draw a line at the correct angle directly onto the drawing. He used a sector as the basis of his instrument and placed the horizon glass at one tip and the index mirror near the hinge connecting the two rulers. The two revolving elements were linked mechanically and the barrel supporting the mirror was twice the diameter of the hinge to give the required angular ratio.
