= Karl Ledersteger =

Austrian scientist (1900–1972)

Karl Ledersteger (11 November 1900, in Vienna – 24 September 1972, near Vienna) was an important geodesist and geophysicist.

After studies of astronomy, mathematics and geodesy he worked in Germany and later in the National Survey of Austria. Later he set up the scientific department of the Federal Office for Metrology and Survey (BEV), Vienna. In the 1950s he was appointed as a professor of geodesy and astrometry at the Technical University of Vienna. He was head of many research projects, and author of about 200 scientific articles. Still a standard work of astronomical and physical geodesy is his textbook of Erdmessung (Vol. V of the series Handbuch der Vermessungskunde, 871 p.) published 1969.

In 1958/59, Ledersteger was the first geodesist in Central Europe who published on the future fields of satellite geodesy. Other topics of his research were:

- Theory of National survey (Landesvermessung) - and practical computation of the ZEN (Zentraleuropäisches Netz, Berlin ~1940) and of parts of the ED50
- Theory of equilibrium figures of Earth and planets
- Isostasy of the Earth's crust and its effect on geoid determination; a main part was published posthumously by his successor Kurt Bretterbauer
- the system of vertical deflections and the definition of reference ellipsoids.

Ledersteger was in intensive contact with the scientific community of whole Europe, US and Russia (e.g. Viktor Ambartsumian, B. Gutenberg, F. Hopfner, W. Heiskanen, M. Kneissl, Sir Harold Jeffreys, Vening Meinesz, H. Moritz, A. Prey, H. H. Schmid, E. Wiechert and S. Zhongolovitch). For almost 20 years he was chair of ÖKIE (Austrian Commission for international Geodesy) and a member of many international commissions and research groups, e.g. in IUGG, DGK and scientific academies of Austria, Germany and Hungary.

Ledersteger received many prizes, several doctorates honoris causa and calls to universities. In Vienna he was asked to begin geodetic lectures immediately after World War II, but his professorship was postponed for 10 years because of his participation in Nazi surveys 1940–1945. He translated several works including a textbook of Magnizki & Browar on theoretical geodesy.

== External links, sources and literature ==
- Literature Online, University Innsbruck, c. 20 titles
- Karl Ledersteger 70 years, Harvard
- K. Ledersteger: "Astronomische und Physikalische Geodäsie (Erdmessung)", Handbuch der Vermessungskunde, Wilhelm Jordan, Otto Eggert and Max Kneissl ed., Volume V, chapter 4 (Geoid) and 11 (gravity), J.B.Metzler-Verlag, Stuttgart 1968
- K. Ledersteger, several lectures and reprints (Austrian & German Univ.libraries), c. 1940 bis 1975
- Péter Biró: 100 éve született Karl Ledersteger (K. Ledersteger 100th birthday). Geodézia és Kartográfia, Vol.52/12 (p. 32 ff), Budapest 2000.
- Karl Ledersteger in the German National Library catalogue
