= Robert Johannes Livländer =

Estonian astronomer and geodesist

Robert Johannes Livländer (1 February 1903 Tallinn – 6 October 1944) was an Estonian astronomer and geodesist.

In 1932, he defended his doctoral thesis at Tartu University.

1941–1944, he was the rector of Tallinn Technical University.

He was one of the developer of the gravimetric network of Baltic states.
