= Johann Heinrich Louis Krüger =

Johann Heinrich Louis Krüger (21 September 1857 – 1 June 1923) was a German mathematician and surveyor/geodesist. He became director of the Prussian Geodetic Institute of Potsdam in 1917 and wrote several books on geodesy, operational and theoretical. In 1912, he presented his "Konforme Abbildung des Erdellipsoids in der Ebene", one of the works that led to the 1923 Gauss–Krüger map projection.
