= Hirvonen =

Hirvonen is a Finnish surname. Notable people with the surname include:

- Elina Hirvonen (born 1975), Finnish writer and journalist
- Heikki Hirvonen (1895–1973), Finnish biathlete
- Mikko Hirvonen (born 1980), Finnish rally driver
- Pasi Hirvonen (born 1988), Finnish ice hockey player
- Raimo Hirvonen (born 1950), Finnish sport wrestler
- Reino Antero Hirvonen (1908–1989), Finnish geodesist
- Timo Hirvonen (born 1973), Finnish ice hockey player
- Tomi Hirvonen (born 1977), Finnish ice hockey player
