= Star position =

Apparent angular position of any star in the sky; point on the celestial sphere

The equatorial coordinate system on the celestial sphere

Star position is the apparent angular position of any given star in the sky, which seems fixed onto an arbitrary sphere centered on Earth. The location is defined by a pair of angular coordinates relative to the celestial equator: right ascension (α) and declination (δ). This pair based the equatorial coordinate system.

While δ is given in degrees (from +90° at the north celestial pole to −90° at the south), α is usually given in hour angles (0 to 24 h). This is due to the observation technique of star transits, which cross the field of view of telescope eyepieces due to Earth's rotation. The observation techniques are topics of positional astronomy and of astrogeodesy.

Ideally, the Cartesian coordinate system (α, δ) refers to an inertial frame of reference. The third coordinate is the star's distance, which is normally used as an attribute of the individual star.

The following factors change star positions over time:

1. axial precession and nutation – slow tilts of Earth's axis with rates of 50 arcseconds and 2 arcseconds respectively, per year;
2. the aberration and parallax – effects of Earth's orbit around the Sun; and
3. the proper motion of the individual stars.

The first and second effects are considered by so-called mean places of stars, contrary to their apparent places as seen from the moving Earth. Usually the mean places refer to a special epoch, e.g. 1950.0 or 2000.0. The third effect has to be handled individually.

The star positions (α, δ) are compiled in several star catalogues of different volume and accuracy. Absolute and very precise coordinates of 1000-3000 stars are collected in fundamental catalogues, starting with the FK (Berlin ~1890) up to the modern FK6.

Relative coordinates of numerous stars are collected in catalogues like the Bonner Durchmusterung (Germany 1859-1863, 342,198 rough positions), the SAO catalogue (USA 1966, 250.000 astrometric stars) or the Hipparcos and Tycho catalogue (110.000 and 2 million stars by space astrometry).

== See also ==
- Star catalogue, FK4, FK6
- Equatorial coordinates, Ecliptic coordinates
- annual aberration, improper motion
- Geodetic astronomy, transit instruments
