= Karl Ramsayer =

Karl Heinrich Ramsayer (29 September 1911, Schwäbisch Gmünd – 24 December 1982, near Stuttgart) was a German geodesist and is well known as one of the most important scientists in geodetic astronomy and in electronic navigation.

In the 1950s Ramsayer became professor at the Geodetic Institute of the University of Stuttgart. In the following years he founded the Institut für Navigation which he developed to a leading research institute in the fields of avionics. Many patents in automatic positioning methods and air guidance systems have their origin in Stuttgart research projects.

== Work on navigation and geodesy ==
Much of Ramsayer's research on navigation concerned dead reckoning, automatic navigation maps based on Doppler radar, and improvements in astro navigation. Long series of NATO test flights showed the advantages of combining different positioning methods (integrated navigation). He is the author of some hundred special articles in scientific journals and author or coauthor of some dozen research reports.

In geodesy and geosciences, Ramsayer's priority was the integration of electronic and astronomic observation methods to improve the mutual quality and the strength of networks. Another focus was analyses of the interdependence of accuracy and systematic errors. One of his major works late in life was volume IIa of the Handbuch der Vermessungskunde, published in 1968.

Ramsayer retired from the geodetic institute in May 1980 and from flight navigation in 1981. His successors were Erik Grafarend in the area of geodesy and Philipp Hartl in the area of navigation. Ramsayer was honoured by several academic prizes and made an honorary doctor; in 1982 he got the most important prize in Austrian geodesy, the Friedrich Hopfner medal.

He died near Stuttgart.

== Important publications and sources ==
- Geodätische Astronomie (1969): Volume IIa of Handbuch der Vermessungskunde (900 p.), J.B. Metzler/ Stuttgart
- TACAN and Doppler radar; Automatische Koppelkarte; Integrated Geodesy. NATO research papers, 1965-1970
- Festkolloquium 9 May 1980 on the occasion of retirement of o. Prof. Dr-Ing. Karl Ramsayer. Geodätisches Institut der Universität Stuttgart, DGK Reihe E/19, Munich 1981, ISBN 3-7696-9664-6
- Festvortrag (Ceremonial address) at the TU Vienna (1982), and overview on Ramsayers scientific work: Österr. Zeitschrift für Vermessungswesen und Photogrammetrie (ÖZfVuPh) Vol.70, p. 231-233, Verlag Rohrer, Baden bei Wien.
