= Karl-Rudolf Koch =

German geodesist

- Born: 30 July 1935 (age 91); Hilchenbach, Westphalia, Prussia
- Education: University of Bonn
- Scientific career
- Fields: Geodesy
- Workplaces: University of Bonn
- Doctoral advisor: Walter Hofmann

Karl-Rudolf Koch (born 30 July 1935) is a German geodesist and professor at the University of Bonn (FRG). In the global geodetic community, he is well known for his research work in geodetic statistics, particularly robust parameter estimation and in gravity field models.

== Biography ==
Karl-Rudolf Koch was born on 30 July 1935 in Hilchenbach, Province of Westphalia, Germany. From 1955-1959 he studied surveying and geodesy at the University of Bonn, receiving a Diplom-Hauptprüfung für Vermessungsingenieure. From 1960-1963 he attended a preparatory service for civil servants (Vermessungsreferendar) hosted by the regional government of Arnsberg. Koch then married Gisela Hasenbäumer in 1961. From 1963-1965 he was a research assistant for Prof. Walter Hofmann, and from 1965-1966 for Prof. Helmut Wolf, Inst. of Geodesy, resp. Theoretical Geodesy, University of Bonn. His two children Susanne and Michael were born in 1963 and 1965 respectively.

In 1965 Koch was awarded Doctor of Engineering (Dr.-Ing.) with the thesis "Die gravimetrische Lotabweichungs-Berechnung in begrenzten Gebieten bei lückenhaftem Schwerematerial". Then in 1966 he received the title of Docent (Venia Legendi in Geodesy). His habilioration thesis was "Derivation of Green's Fundamental Formula for any one direction, leading to Integral equations and to Neumann's inverse boundary problem of Potential theory". And from 1967-1968 he was a guest researcher at Ohio State University.

From 1968-1970 he conducted research for the National Geodetic Survey in Rockville, Maryland. His work included development of Earth's gravity field models by the method of "Potential der einfachen Schicht" (single density layer). From 1970-1978 he was an applied Professor at Institut für Theoretische Geodäsie, University of Bonn and conducted lectures in astronomical and physical geodesy, including geoid determination by satellite geodesy and DTMs.

In the years 1971–1974, 1976, 1978 and 1983, he returned to the National Geodetic Survey in Maryland to perform various research projects. In 1972 he was invited to teach at the Technical University Vienna (Austria) after the death of Karl Ledersteger, but he declined. From 1977-1982 he was a member of the Satellite Geodesy Commission of DGK and the Netherlands. From 1978-2000 he had full Professorship (Universitäts-Professor) at the University of Bonn and was Director of the Geodetic Institute. His work included research in statistics, deformation measurements, variance-covariance estimations in geodesy and immobiles, optimization of geodetic networks and datum transformations of geodetic systems, and satellite altimetry. He also conducted outlier tests and reliability measures and the evaluation of satellite altimeter data to determine the geoides of oceans.

In 1979 he was a member of the German Geodetic Commission at the Bavarian Academy of Sciences. From 1979-1984 he was president of the IAG Study Group 4.60 for statistical methods and analysis of geodetic measurements. In 1980 he published the 1st edition of the book Parameter Estimation and Hypothesis Testing in Linear Models, with the 2nd, 3rd and 4th editions being published in 1987, 1997, and 2004 respectively. The first and second editions of the English translations were published in 1988 and 1999 respectively. From 1980-1987 he served as an expert in a radar altimeter group of the ESA.

In 1983, 1985 he lectured in Curitiba in the fields of adjustment and statistics and in 1985, 1986, 1987 he conducted various lectures in Wuhan, Haifa, and Calgary in adjustment and statistics.

== Selected publications ==
- Koch, K. R.; Pope, A. J. (1972). "Uniqueness and Existence for the Geodetic Boundary Value Problem using the Known Surface of the Earth". Bulletin Géodésique. 106 (4): 467–476. Bibcode:1972BGeod..46..467K. doi:10.1007/BF02522053. S2CID 121608955.
- Koch, K. R.; Yang, Y. (1998). "Robust Kalman Filter for Rank Deficient Observation Models". Journal of Geodesy. 72 (7–8): 436–441. Bibcode:1998JGeod..72..436K. doi:10.1007/s001900050183. S2CID 121044664.
- Koch, K. R. (2010). Parameter Estimation and Hypothesis Testing in Linear Models (2nd ed.). Berlin: Springer. ISBN 978-3-642-08461-4.
