= Star transit =

Passage of a star across the field of view of a telescope eyepiece

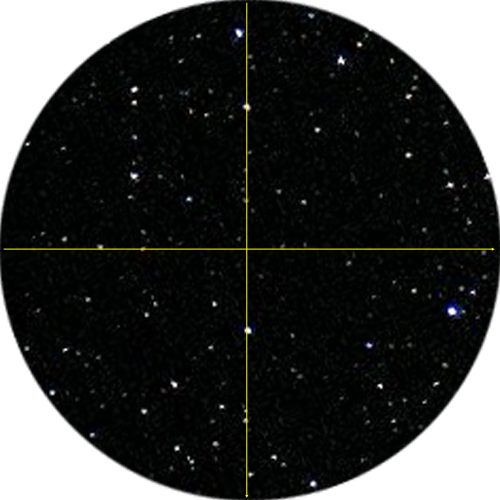
Star transits (Reticle 2°, magnif. ~10, two stars passing the vertical thread). Timing accuracy may be ±0,5 s.

A star transit is the passage of a star across the field of view of a telescope eyepiece.

The precise observation of star transits is the basis of many methods in astronomy and in geodesy. The measurements can be done in different ways:

1. visually (mostly up to 1990): accuracy 0,1" to 2" (depending on the instrument); timing with digital clocks about 0,05–0,2 seconds;
2. by CCD and other electro-optical sensors: as above, time often better;
3. semi automatic instruments: photography or "impersonal micrometer", ca. 2 times better than No. 1;
4. by scanning methods: astrometry satellites like Hipparcos about 0,01".

== See also ==
- Accuracy and precision
- Instrument error
- Meridian circle
- Minute and second of arc
- Theodolite
- Transit instrument

== Literature ==
- Karl Ramsayer, 1969: Geodätische Astronomie, Vol.2a of Handbuch der Vermessungskunde, 900 p., J.B. Metzler-Verlag Stuttgart.
- Ivan I. Mueller, 1969: Spherical and Practical Astronomy as applied to Geodesy, 610 p., Fred.Ungar publ., USA
- IAU Coll.48: Modern Astrometry, Egermann, University Vienna.
