= Department of Geodesy GUT =

Department at the Gdańsk University of Technology

Department of Geodesy, Faculty of Civil and Environmental Engineering, Gdańsk University of Technology
- Katedra Geodezji, Wydział Inżynierii Lądowej i Środowiska, Politechnika Gdańska
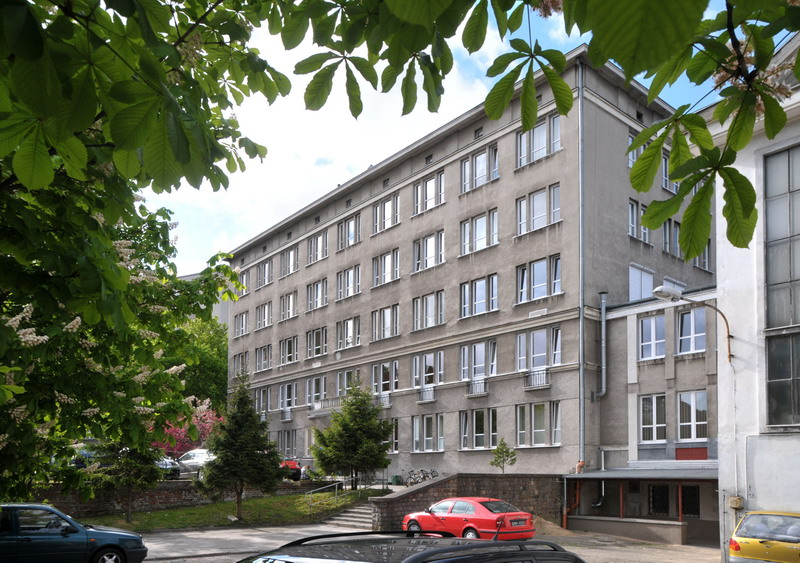
- Building No. 20, HYDRO - the seat of the Department of Geodesy, Gdańsk University of Technology
- Established: 1945 (1904)
- Head of Department: Marek Przyborski, Assoc.Prof of GUT
- Academic staff: 24
- Administrative staff: 3
- Location: Gdańsk, Pomeranian Voivodeship, Poland; 54.371489°N 18.616295°E
- Website: wilis.pg.edu.pl/web/katedra-geodezji/

Department of Geodesy Gdańsk University of Technology – continues the tradition of the Department of Surveying and Cartography, established at Gdańsk University of Technology in 1945 (formal appointment of the new Department: October 1, 1945, and the formal appointment of the head of the Department: September 1, 1946).

In the annals of the Gdańsk University of Technology the Department of Geodesy appears for the first time at the Technical University (Preussische Königliche Technische Hochschule) and the Faculty of Civil Engineering (1904). The first head of the Department of Geodesy was Prof. Hermann Otto Paul Eggert (b. 4 February 1874 in Tilsit, d. January 20, 1944 in Gdańsk). In 1921–1937 the next head of the Institute of Geodesy was Prof. Dr. Wilhelm Lührs. In 1938–1945 the Institute of Geodesy and Geometry was led by Prof. Paul Albert Ulrich Graf (February 6, 1908, in Wolgast – September 11, 1954, in Düsseldorf).

The Department of Geodesy at the Gdańsk University of Technology is the oldest in the present Polish unit dealing with science and education in the field of geodesy and cartography (currently in the field of civil engineering and transport).

After 1945, the Department of Geodesy was led by:

- Prof. Paweł Kułakowski (1945-1959)
- Doc. Kazimierz Dziubiński (1959)
- Dr. Henryk Wesołowski (1959-1968)
- Prof. Władysław Wędziński (1968-1971)
- Doc. Marian Sieradzki (1971-1985)
- Prof. Adam Żurowski (1985-1999)
- Dr hab. Zygmunt Kurałowicz (1999-2008)
- Dr. Jakub Szulwic (2008-2011)
- Dr. Janusz Orzechowski (2011-2013)
- Prof. Marek Przyborski (2013-2020)
- Prof. Dominika Wróblewska (2020)

Department of Geodesy - previous names:

- Department of Geodesy (1904-1921)
- Institute of Geodesy (1921-1938)
- Institute of Geodesy and Geometry (1938–1945)
- Department of Surveying and Cartography (1/10/1945-10/05/1949)
- Department of Surveying and Geodesy (11/05/1949-22/06/1956)
- Department of Geodesy (23/06/1956-6/10/1968)
- Department of Geodesy and Land Reclamation (7/10/1968-30/09/1971)
- Department of Geodesy (from 1/10/1971)

== Organizational structure ==
- Head of the Department of Geodesy: Marek Przyborski, Assoc.Prof of GUT.
- Deputy of the Department of Geodesy: Dominika Wroblewska, Dr.Eng.

=== The Research and Teaching Teams ===
- The Scientific team of Geodesy, Cartography and Navigation in Transport,
- The Scientific team of Engineering Surveying and Environmental applications,
- Teaching team of Photogrammetry, Remote Sensing, Cartography and Geographic Information Systems,
- Teaching team of Geodesy and Metrology,
- Teaching team of Geodesy and GNSS,
- Teaching team of Geometry and Engineering Graphics,
- Laboratory of Surveying Instruments.

=== Members of Department - currently ===
- Zofia Baldysz (Dr.Eng.)
- Katarzyna Bobkowska (Dr.Eng.)
- Paweł Burdziakowski (Dr.Eng)
- Mariusz Chmielecki (MSc.)
- Karol Daliga (MSc.)
- Mariusz Figurski (full Prof.)
- Daria Filipiak-Kowszyk (Dr.Eng.)
- Waldemar Gierski (MSc.)
- Lucyna Gliniecka (Tech.)
- Adam Inglot (MSc.)
- Artur Janowski (Dr.Habil.Eng.)
- Waldemar Kamiński (full Prof.)
- Zygmunt Kurałowicz (Assoc.Prof of GUT)
- Karolina Makowska (MSc.)
- Krystyna Michałowska (Dr.Eng.)
- Aleksander Nowak (Dr.Eng.)
- Grzegorz Nykiel (Dr.Eng.)
- Janusz Orzechowski (Dr.Eng.)
- Marek Przyborski (Assoc.Prof of GUT)
- Jerzy Pyrchla (Assoc.Prof of GUT)
- Karol Rudziński (Eng.)
- Anna Sobieraj-Zlobinska (Dr.Eng.)
- Andrzej Stateczny (full Prof.)
- Jakub Szulwic (Dr.Eng.)
- Magdalena Szyc
- Paweł Tysiąc (Dr.Eng..)
- Tadeusz Widerski (Dr.Eng.)
- Dominika Wróblewska (Dr.Eng.)
- Paweł Wysocki (Dr.Eng.)
- Marek Zienkiewicz (Dr.Eng.)

=== Former Members of Department ===
- Barbara Bielecka
- Wioleta Błaszczak-Bąk
- Mariusz Burdukiewicz
- Katarzyna Ciszkiewicz
- Ryszard Dunikowski
- Kazimierz Dziubiński
- Hermann Paul Otto Eggert
- Jan Faustmann
- Jerzy Frąckowiak
- Witold Gottowt-Wojszwiłło
- Ulrich Paul Albert Graf
- Agnieszka Jurkowska
- Paweł Kułakowski
- Jan Kwaśniewski
- Eugeniusz Łoboda
- Wojciech Majewski
- Waldemar Milewski
- Krzysztof Mroczkowski
- Janusz Najder
- Wilhelm Lührs
- Adam Plejewski
- Tadeusz Rogiński
- Martin Schirmer
- Gustav Schütz
- Marian Sieradzki
- Danuta Sosińska
- Cezary Specht
- Bogdan Szczechowski
- Tadeusz Tarnawski
- Fritz Weber
- Henryk Wesołowski
- Władysław Wędziński
- Mieczysław Wizmur
- Tomasz Wronowski
- Wiesław Wszelaczyński
- Adam Żurowski.

== Scientific activity ==
Scientific activity of the Department of Geodesy includes research in the following areas:

- Research displacements and deformations of land and water structures and technical equipment.
- The use of electronic measuring instruments in the construction industry.
- Geodetic control measurements during erection and operation of offshore structures.
- Surveying control of overhead cranes and lifting equipment.
- The use of digital maps for construction and environmental engineering.
- Navigation and positioning of vehicles, aircraft and construction equipment.
- Geographic information systems in managing and protecting the environment.
- Inventory and modeling of urban and architectural heritage.
- Field studies and modeling of displacements and stability of structures erected on weak ground.
- Methods of protection against environmental noise.
- Special measurements.

== Gallery ==
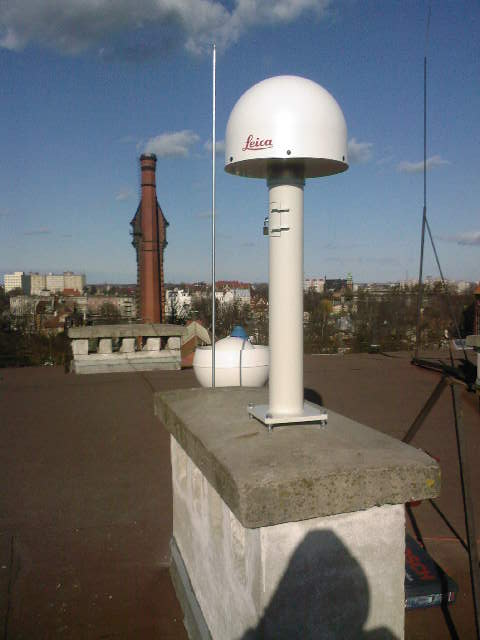
GNSS satellite station antenna GDPG on the building HYDRO Gdańsk University of Technology (2008)

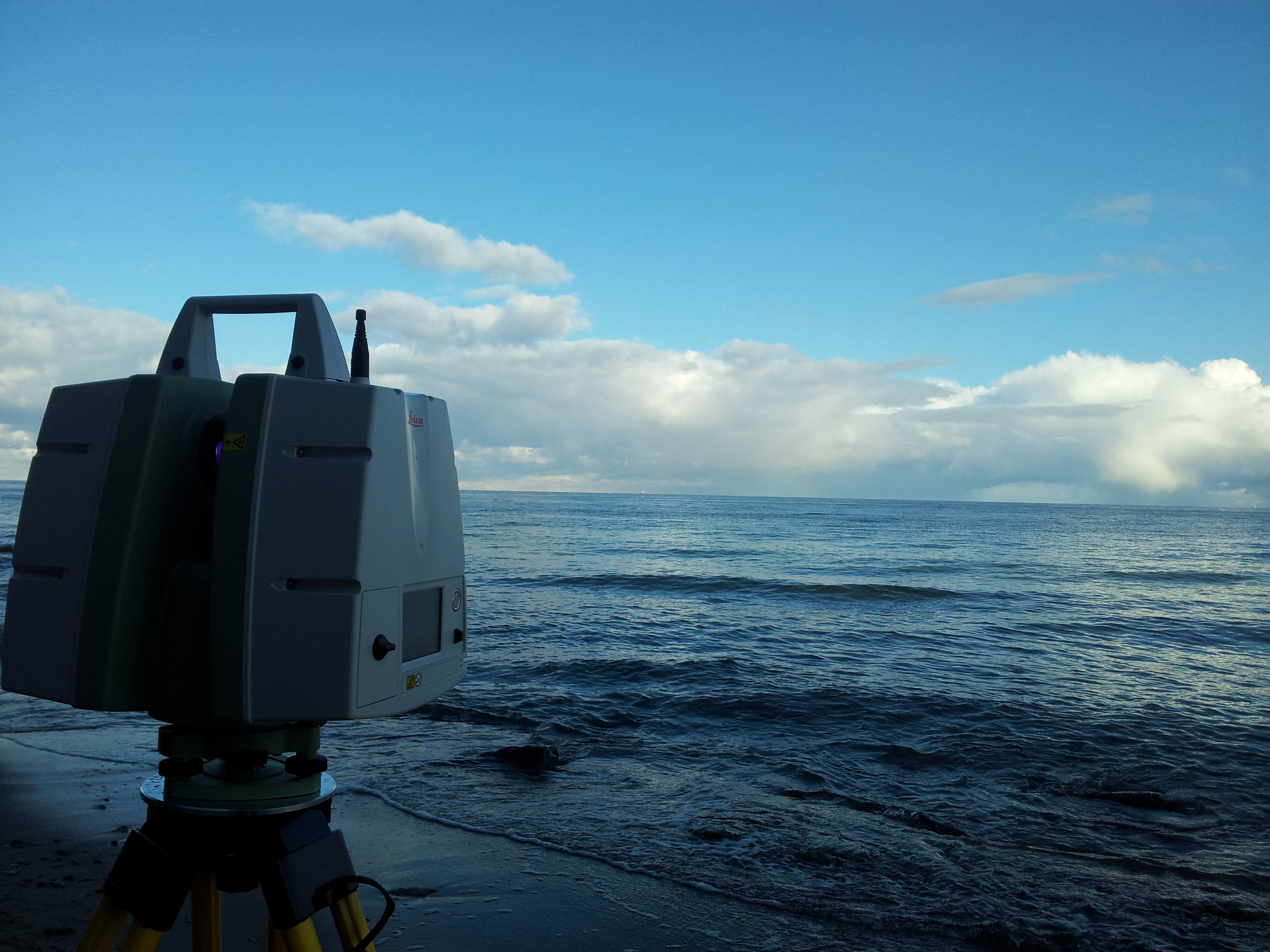
Leica C10 laser scanner when measuring the cliff implemented by the SC Hevelius and the team of the Department (Baltic Sea, 2012)

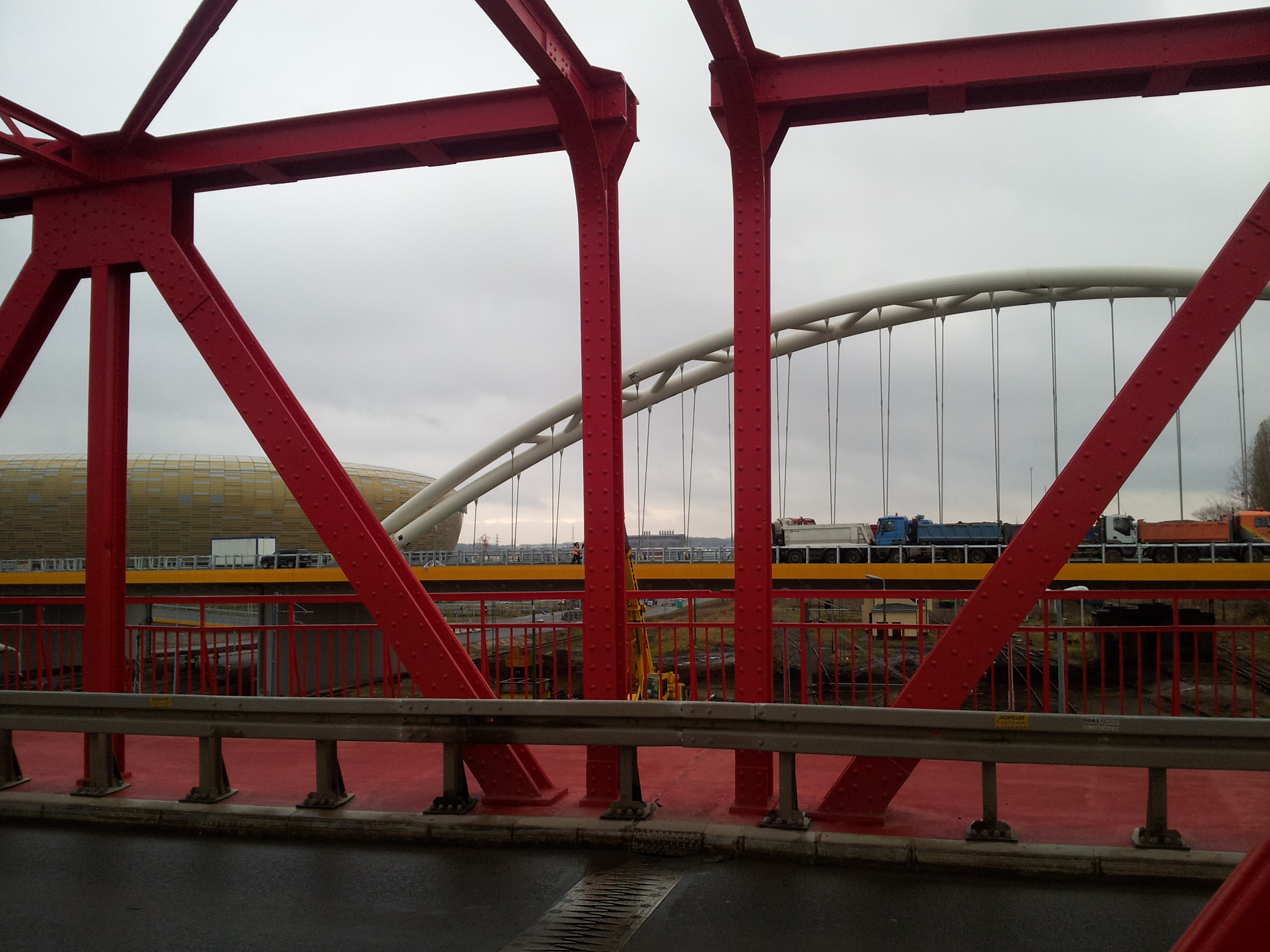
Stress tests of the bridge (Gdańsk, 2012)

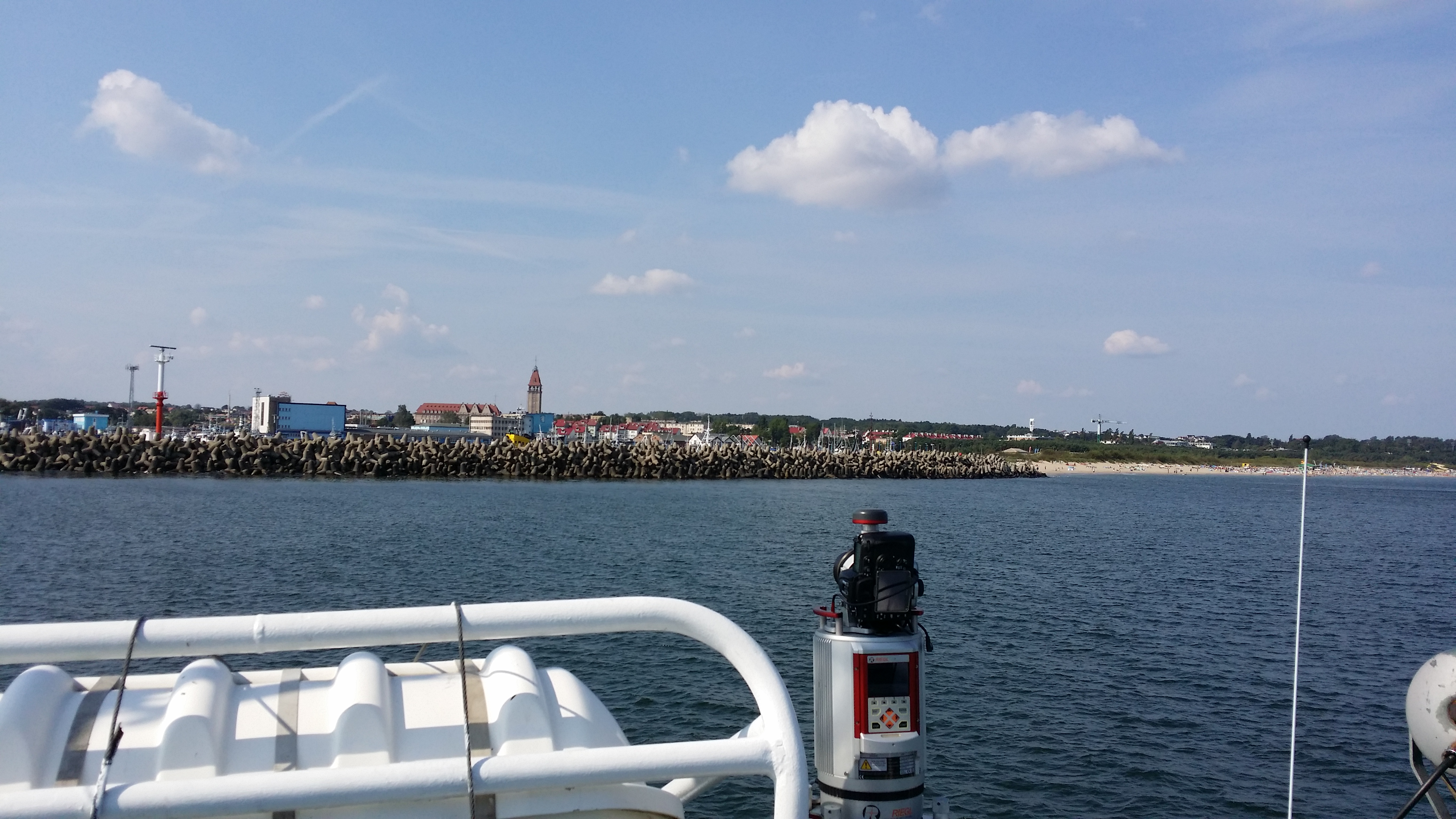
Maritime Laser Scanning (Harbour in Wladyslawowo, Baltic Sea, 2014)

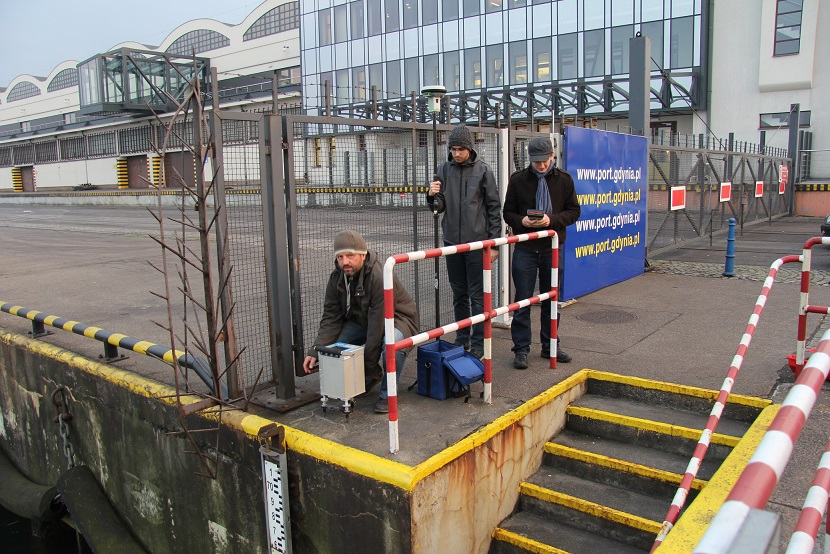
Gravimetric measurements - measurement campaign around the point of absolute gravimetric the University of Gdańsk (staff gauge, Baltic Sea, Gulf of Gdańsk, 2015)

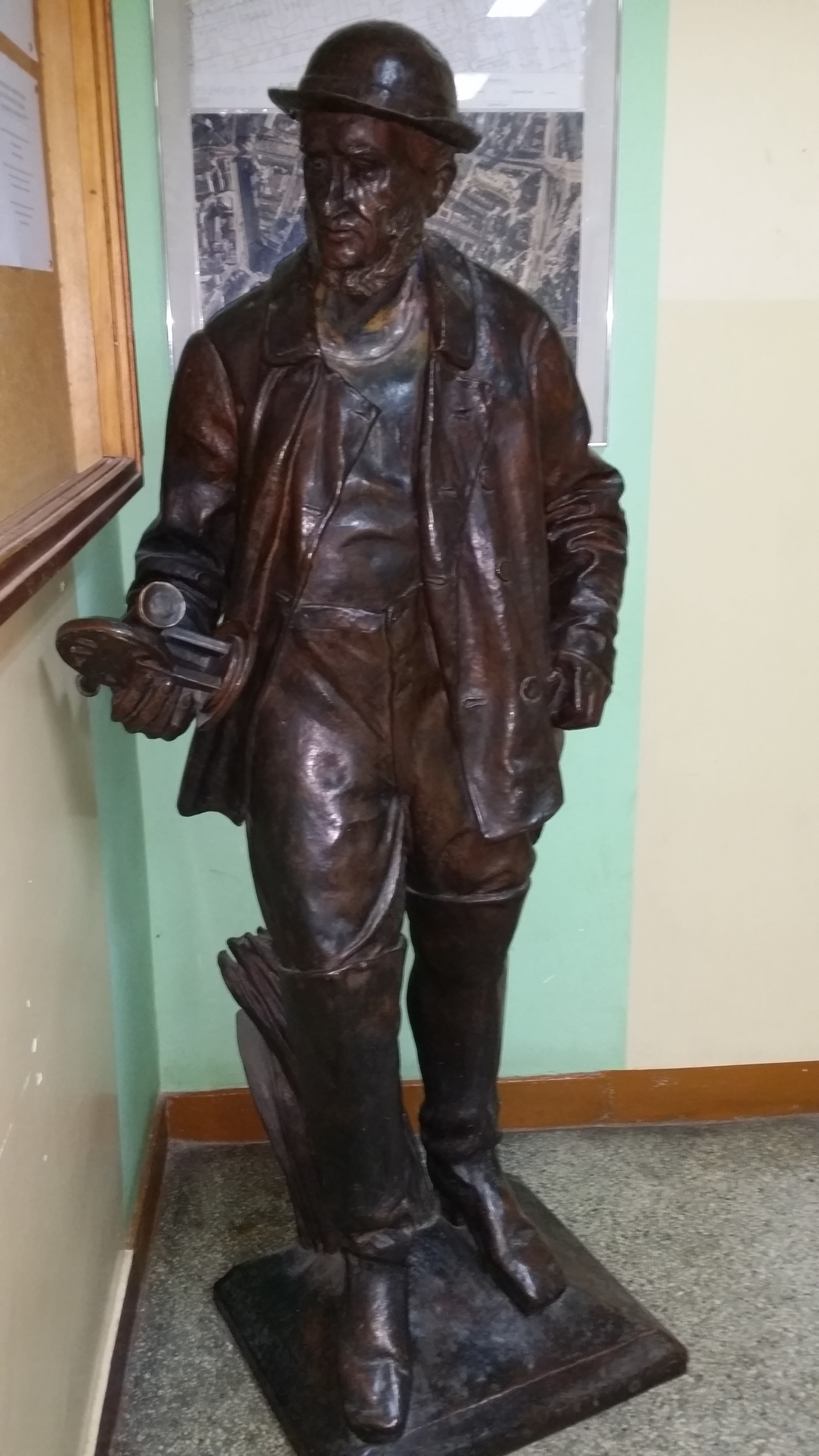
Pre-war sculpture surveyor - adorned the lobby of the Main Building Gdańsk University of Technology, which housed the headquarters of the Institute of Geodesy at the time Free City of Gdańsk

== Conferences and Symposiums ==
Surveying the Maritime Economy (1975-1988)

A series of scientific conferences held in 1975, 1979, 1988 by a team led by Adam Żurowski and in cooperation with the Gdańsk branch of the Association of Polish Surveyors.

Special Issues Geodetic measurements Engineering (1989)

Polish-German seminar technology in Gdańsk.

Conference Departments and Institutes of Geodesy (1994)

Cyclical conference, which is held on 14–15.10.1994 was held in the Department of Geodesy under the auspices of the Section Departments and Institutes of Geodesy Committee of Geodesy Polish Academy of Sciences.

Jubilee session the Department of Geodesy (2005)

June 17, 2005 on the occasion of the 60th anniversary of the Department of Geodesy at the Polish Gdańsk University of Technology held a symposium with the presentation of research papers.

Published materials Jubilee Session of the 60th anniversary of the Department of Geodesy

Conference Innovative technologies surveying (2009)

It took place on 29 June 2009. In the Auditorium GUT in the main building of the Technical University of Gdańsk in the framework of the workshop IV of Technology. The theme was surveying Innovative technologies - used in construction and architecture. Co-organizers were the companies: OPGK Gdańsk, BI and ZSI Microsystem Ltd.

Scientific-Technical Conference Geomatics 2010

It was held from 1–2 July 2010. In the main building of the Technical University of Gdańsk. Gathered approx. 200 people of Polish and abroad and published 6 volumes of monograph themes.

As part of Geomatics 2010 took place:

- XXIII Conference of Geodesy Departments and Institutes Special Section of Geodesy at the Polish Academy of Sciences,
- The national celebration of the World Hydrography Day 2010
- VII Workshop Technology with an exhibition of equipment and hydrographic surveying.

Surveying Forum (2013)

It was held on September 19, 2013 in the Main Building at the Gdańsk University of Technology Foucault pendulum in the Johnan Hevelius courtyard. The meeting agenda consisted of the following fields: "Provincial Local Government Administration Geodetic and Cartographic - tasks and effects", "Current comments on the functioning of the Municipal Centre for Geodetic and Cartographic Documentation", "Sources of financing the construction ZSIN and BDOT 500", the "Offer training in the field geodesy and cartography", "Use of GNSS reference station networks". There were presentations of companies and open discussions on current industry topics. Forum accompanied by an exhibition of works of diploma graduates Geodesy and Cartography. The Forum was organized in close cooperation with the Gdańsk branch of the Association of Polish Surveyors.

GIS Day

Since 2011, the SC Hevelius with the participation of the Department of Geodesy organizes GIS Day (in cooperation with the University of Gdańsk and ESRI Poland).

Baltic Geodetic Congress and Geomatics 2016

Department of Geodesy with the Polish Association of Surveyors Polish are going organise the Baltic Geodetic Congress. BGC was held 2–4 June 2016 year at the Gdańsk University of Technology. Conference proceedings were published in IEEE Xplore - 2016 Baltic Geodetic Congress (BGC Geomatics) and are indexed in Scopus and Web of Science.

The following events took part Congress:

- 70th anniversary of the Polish Association of Surveyors in Gdańsk,
- Jubilee of Prof. Mirosław Żak and Prof. Adam Żurowski,
- International scientific-technical conference Geomatics 2016. Geomatics 2016 funded under decision 965/P-DUN/2016 by the Ministry of Science and Higher Education Republic of Poland allocated to the activities of disseminating science.
- Forum Innovation in Geodesy. Forum Innovations in Geodesy funded under decision 965/P-DUN/2016 by the Ministry of Science and Higher Education Republic of Poland allocated to the activities of disseminating science.
- Exhibitions, meetings, seminars.

Baltic Geodetic Congress (Geomatics) 2017

Department of Geodesy with the Institute of Geodesy University of Warmia and Mazury in Olsztyn are going organise the Baltic Geodetic Congress (Geomatics) 2017. BGC was held 22–25 June 2017 year at the Gdańsk University of Technology.

The conference proceedings of the 2017 Baltic Geodetic Congress (Geomatics) 2017 are indexed in IEEE Xplore.

Baltic Geodetic Congress (Geomatics) 2018

BGC was held 21–23 June 2018 year at the University of Warmia and Mazury in Olsztyn.

The conference proceedings of the 2018 Baltic Geodetic Congress (Geomatics) 2017 are indexed in IEEE Xplore.
