= GFZ Helmholtz Centre for Geosciences =

German Earth science research center

Coordinates: 52.3826°N 13.0644°E

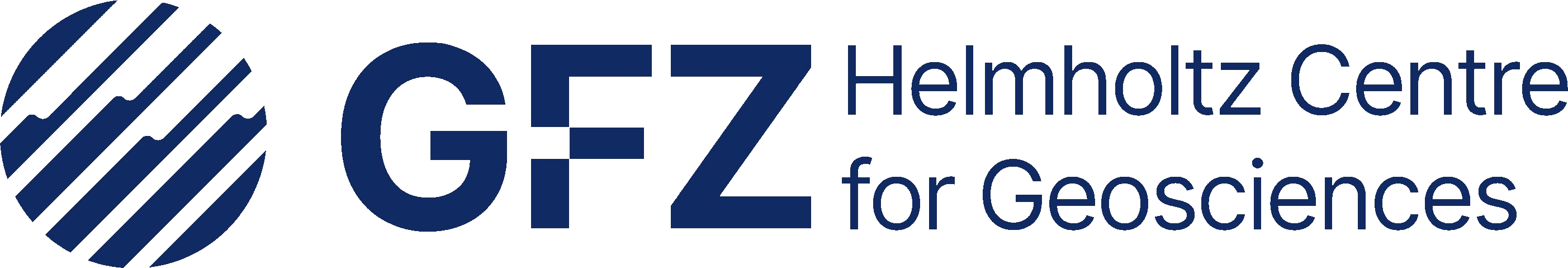
- Founded: 11 December 1956
- Headquarters: Telegrafenberg, Potsdam, Brandenburg, Germany
- Revenue: 95,000,000 euro (2020)
- Parent: Helmholtz Association
- Website: www.gfz.de

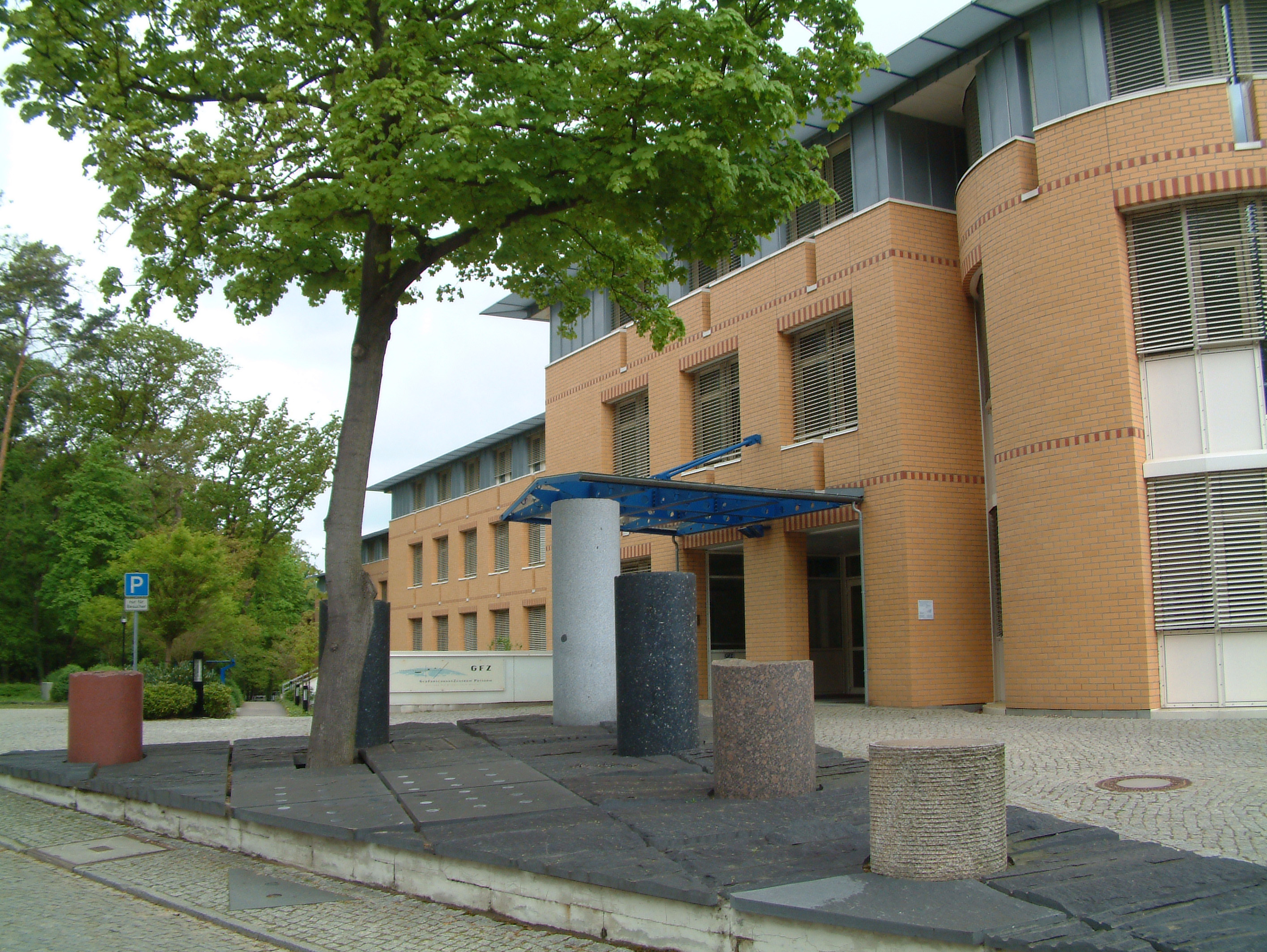
GeoResearch Center in the Albert Einstein Science Park

The GFZ Helmholtz Centre for Geosciences (German: GFZ Helmholtz-Zentrum für Geoforschung; formerly Helmholtz Centre Potsdam – GFZ German Research Centre for Geosciences), or just GFZ, is the national research center for Earth Sciences in Germany. Located in the Albert Einstein Science Park on the hill of Telegrafenberg, Potsdam, Brandenburg, GFZ is part of the Helmholtz Association of National Research Centres.

"GFZ" stands for GeoForschungsZentrum (Geo-research Centre).

== History ==
The GFZ was founded in 1992. It is the latest in a long line of research institutes that have been located on the Telegrafenberg. These have included the Central Institute of for Physics of the Earth (ZIPE), which was an institute of the Academy of Sciences of the GDR (German Democratic Republic) that was actively involved in Geodesy. The history of the GFZ can be traced back to the Geodätisches Institut Potsdam, an institution of the Prussian Academy of Sciences. Under the directorship of Friedrich Robert Helmert from 1886 to 1917, the institute developed into the world's leading center for scientific geodesy. The current GFZ is supported 90% by the German Ministry of Education and Research, and 10% from the Ministry of Science, Research, and Culture from the state of Brandenburg.

=== Exhibition ===
Between 24 March and 9 July 2017 GFZ shows a bilingual exhibition (German / English) with the title Focus: Earth – Measuring our World in the Haus der Brandenburgisch-Preußischen Geschichte in Potsdam with many exhibits of the history of geosciences on the Telegrafenberg hill.

Exhibition 2017 (selection)

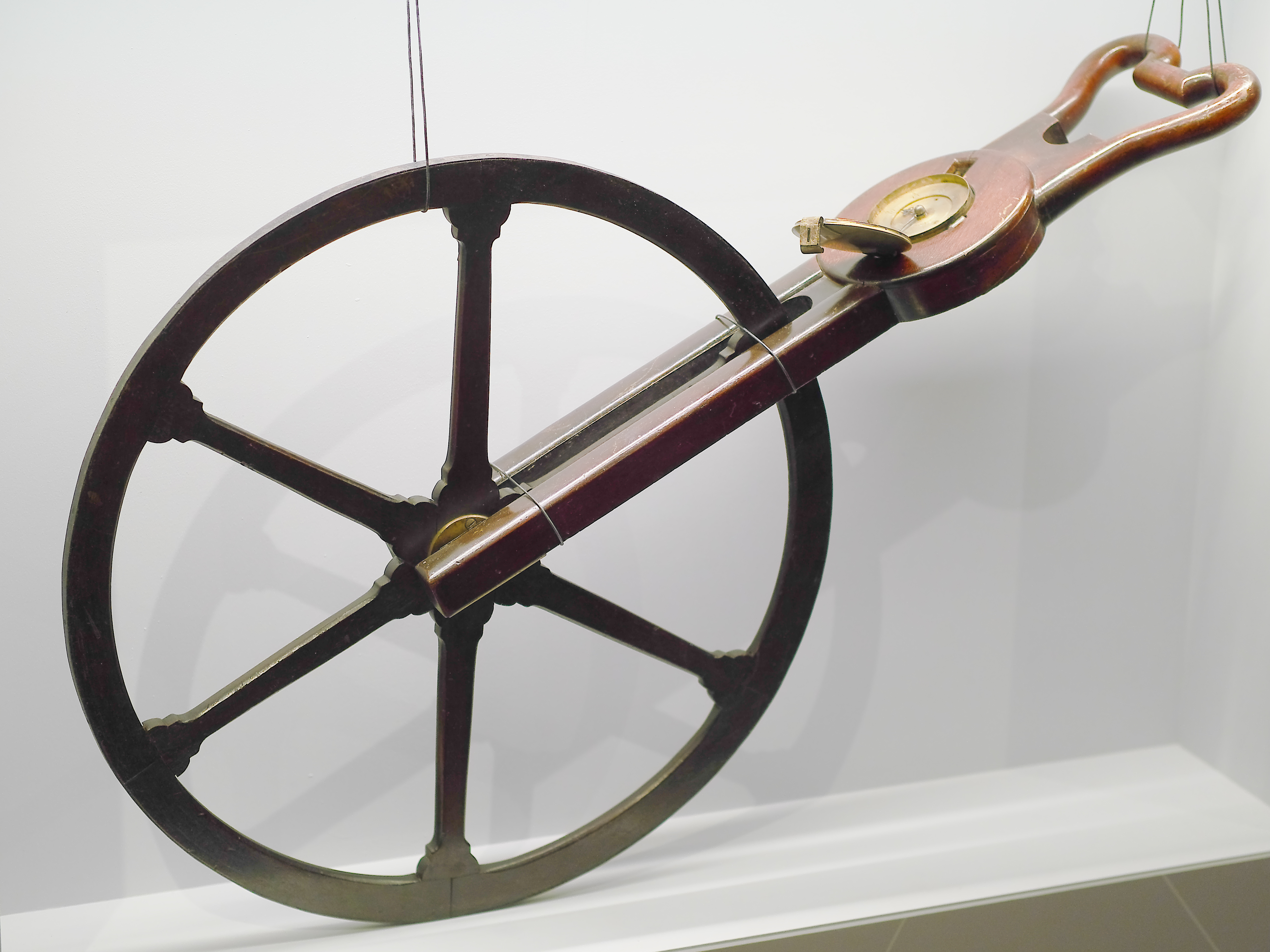
Surveyor's wheel, London (around 1760)

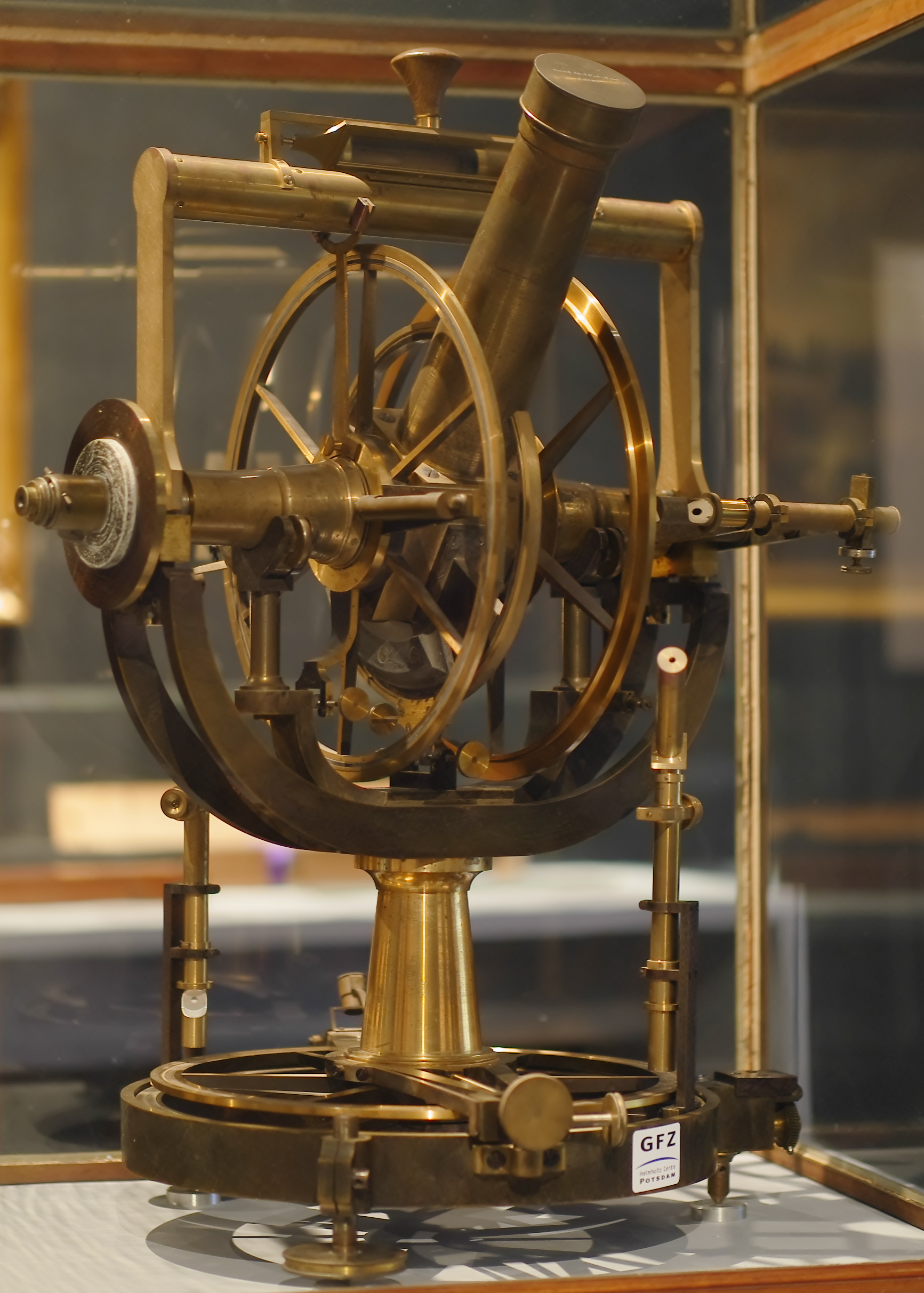
Historical universal theodolite, Pistor & Martins, Berlin (1851)

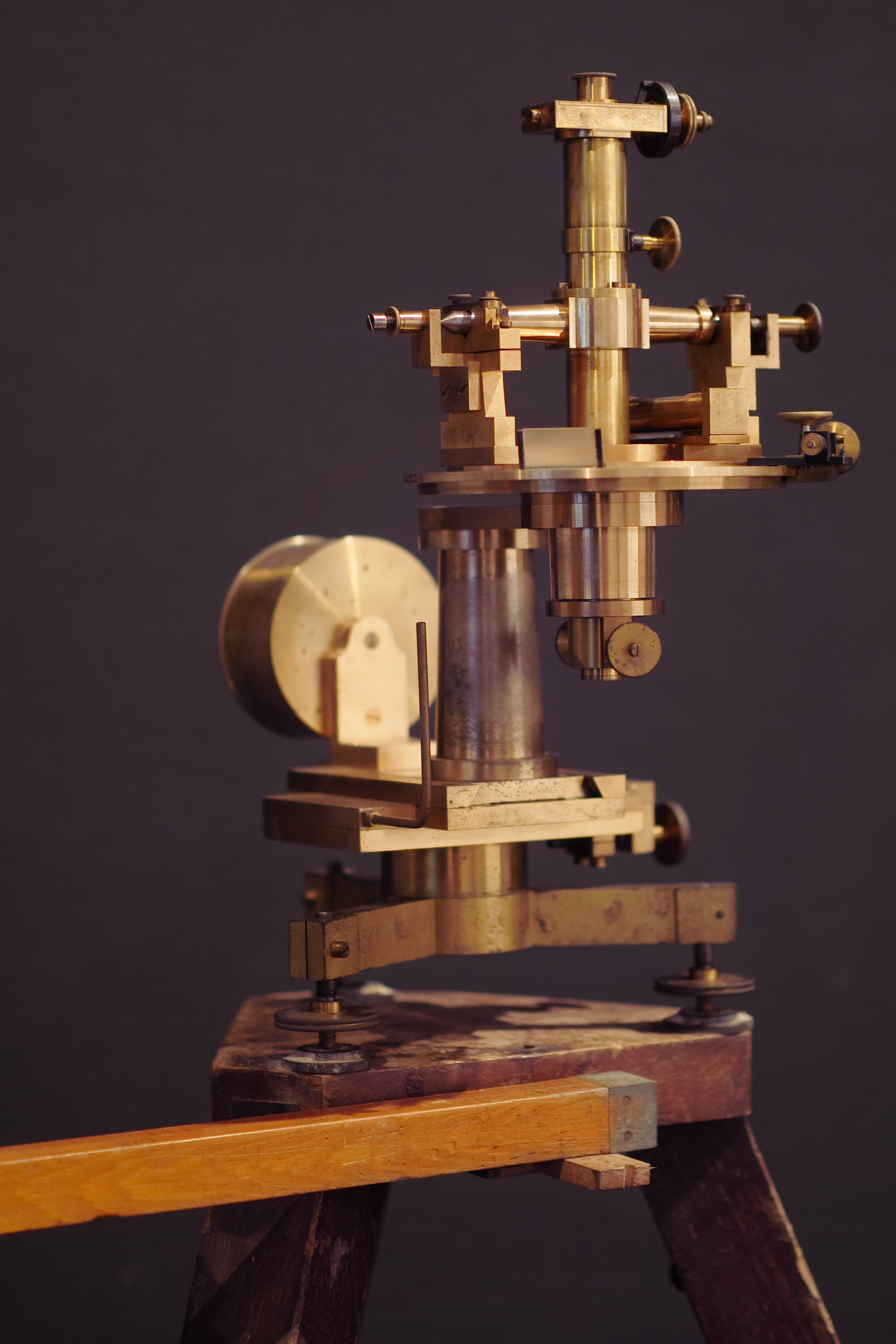
Basis apparatus for surveying geodetic base lines, Gebrüder Brunner, Paris (1876 to 1878)

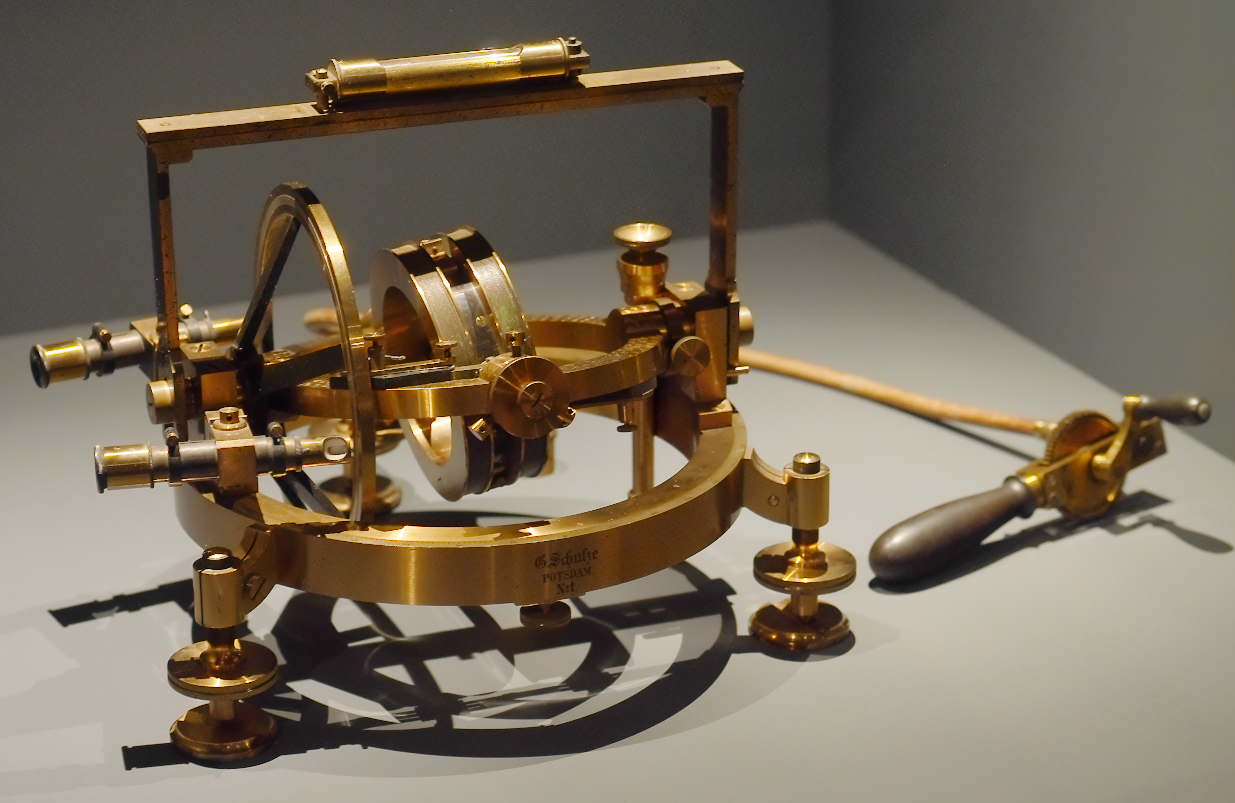
Electromagnetic dip number 1, G. Schulze, Potsdam (around 1900)

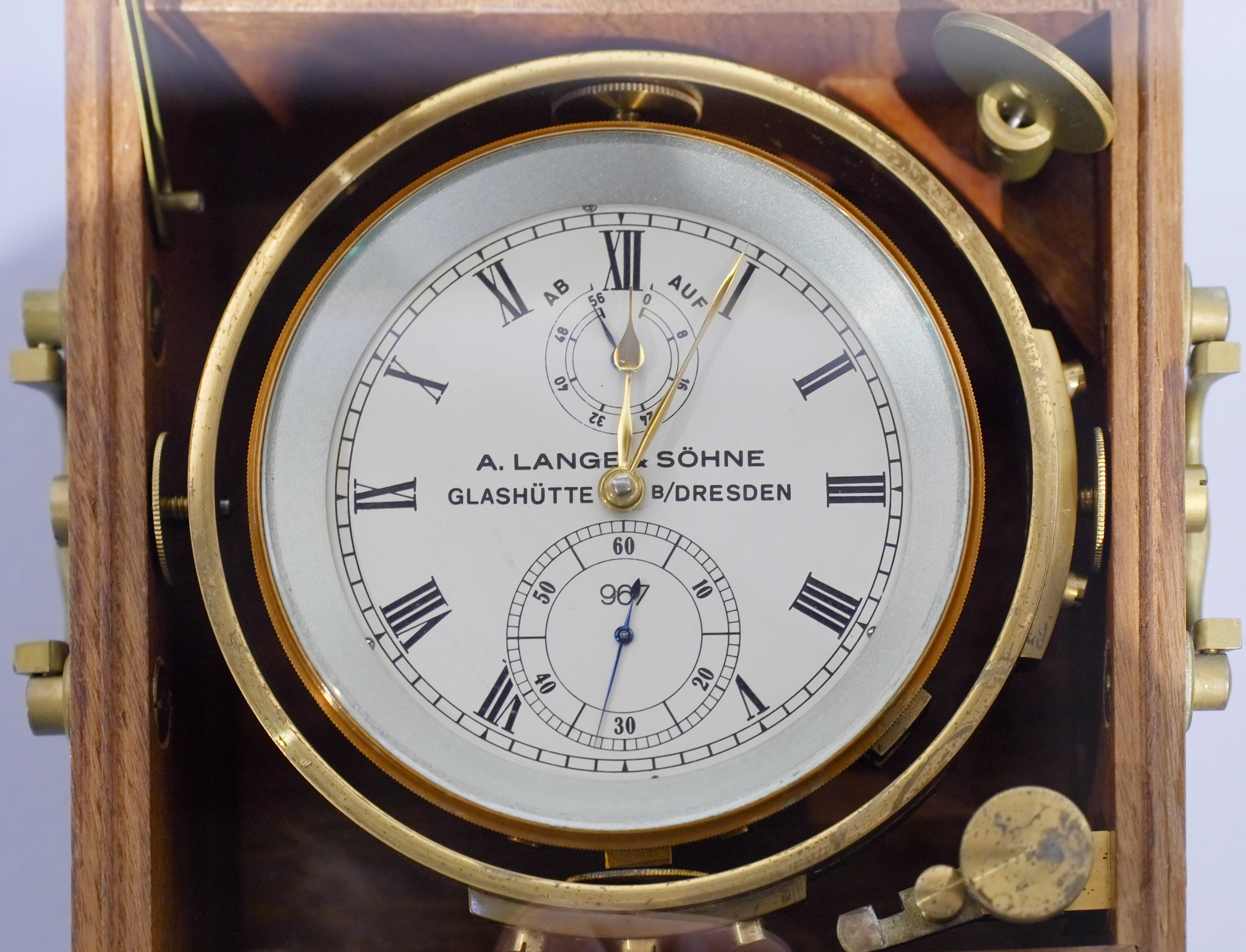
Marine chronometer, A. Lange & Söhne, Glashütte (1948)

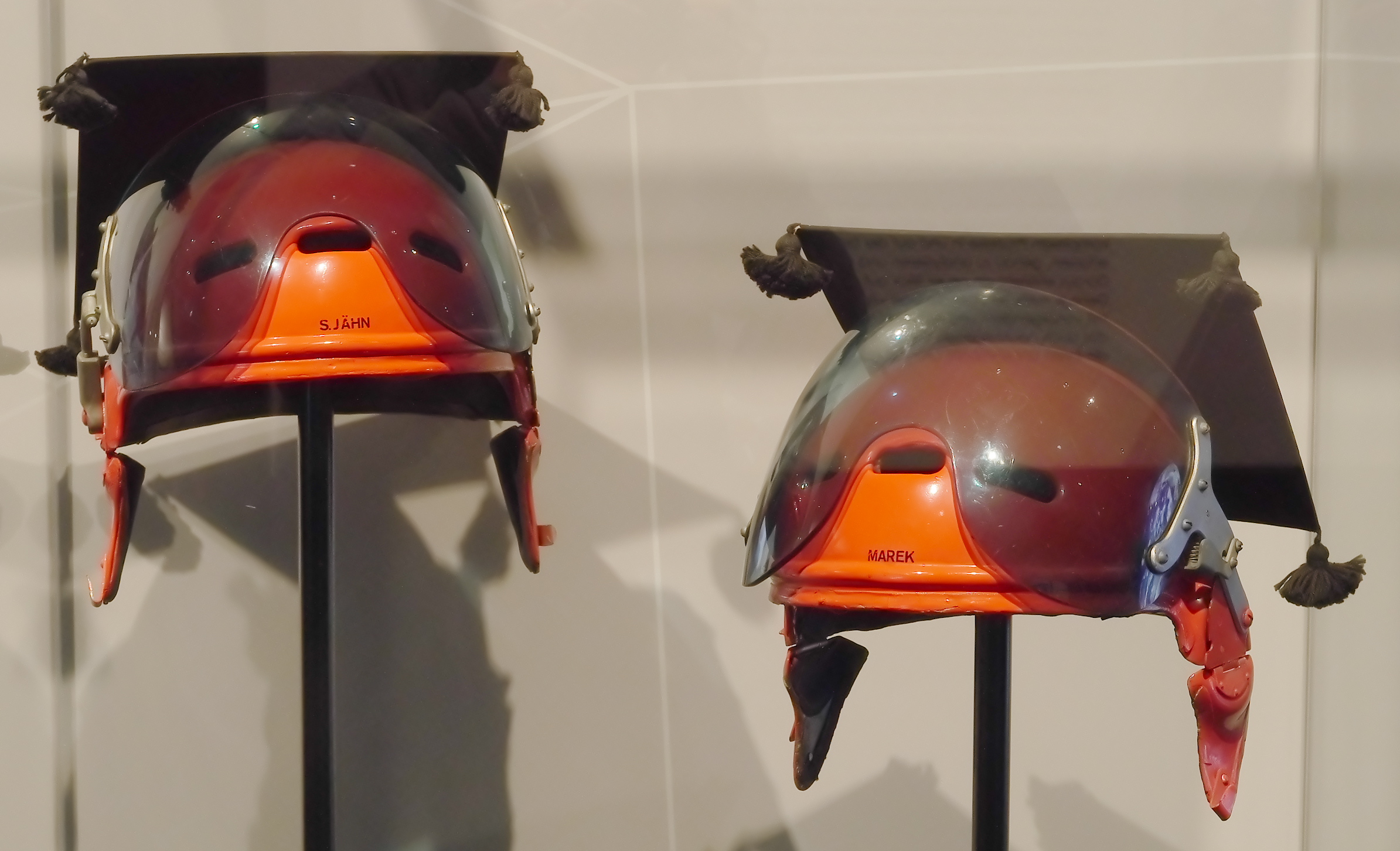
Square academic caps made with helmets of the Nationale Volksarmee of Sigmund Jähn and Karl-Heinz Marek (1983)

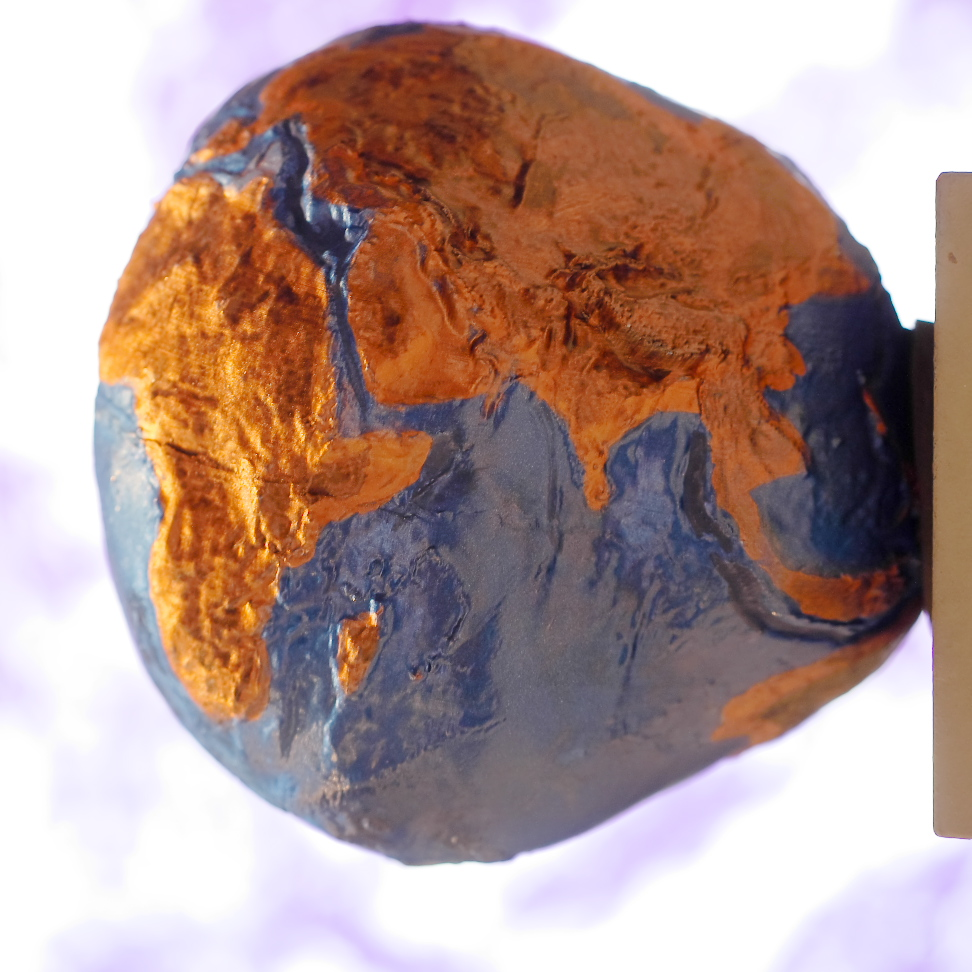
Three-dimensional model of the so-called "Potsdamer Kartoffel" (Potato of Potsdam) with a 15000x magnification of the surface's level of the earth, Potsdam (2017)

== See also ==
- Johann Heinrich Louis Krüger
- Heinrich Bruns
- Otto Eggert
