= Heinrich Bruns =

German mathematician and astronomer (1848–1919)

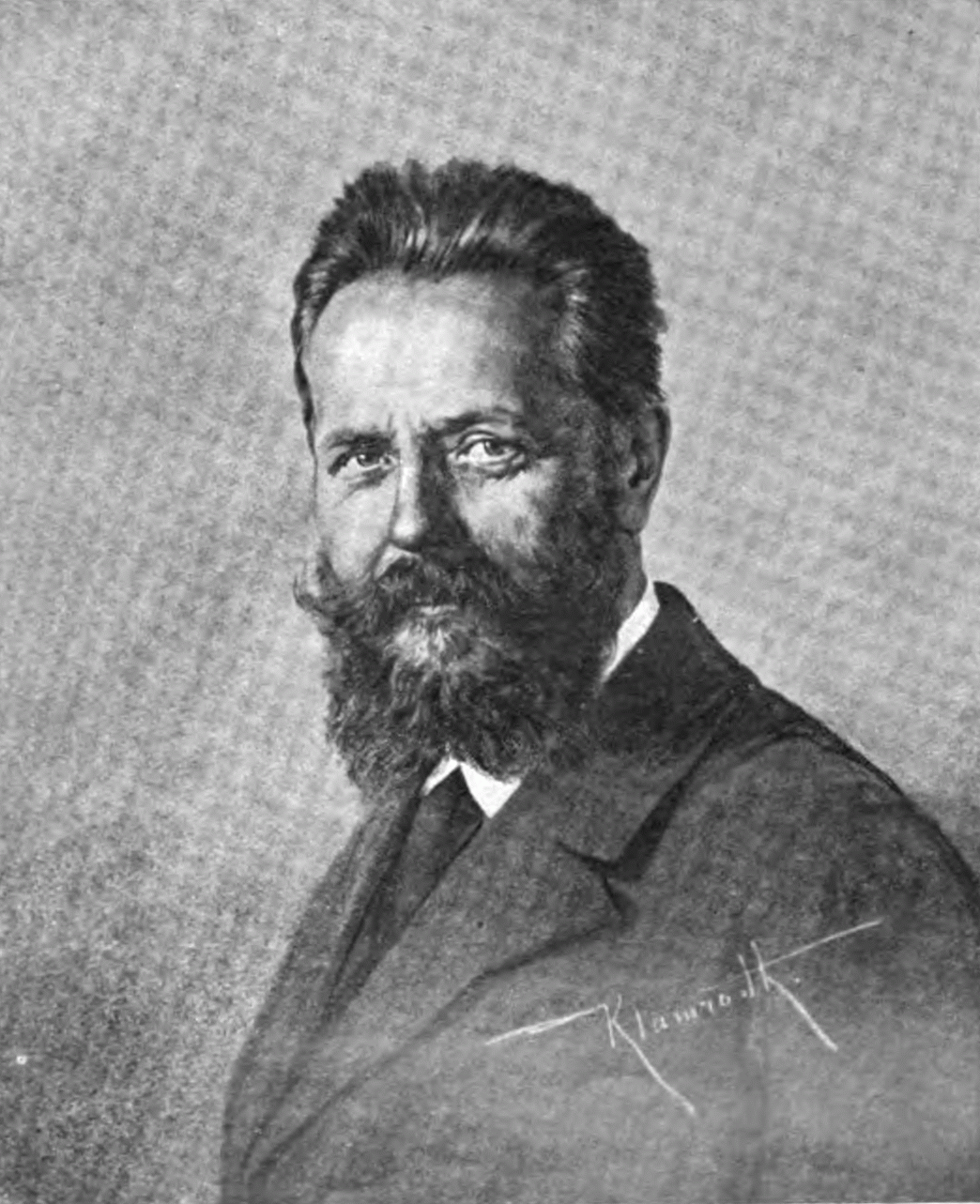
- Born: 4 September 1848; Berlin, Kingdom of Prussia
- Died: 23 September 1919 (aged 71); Leipzig, Germany
- Education: University of Berlin
- Known for: Contributions to the field of geodesy
- Spouse: Marie Wilhelmine Schleussner
- Scientific career
- Fields: Geodesy; Potential theory Equilibrium shapes
- Workplaces: Pulkowa Observatory; Observatory of Dorpat; University of Dorpat; University of Berlin; Prussian Military Academy; Geodetic Institute of Potsdam; University of Leipzig; Leipzig Observatory
- Thesis: De proprietate quadam functionis potentialis corporum homogeneorum ("On the properties of a certain potential function of homogeneous bodies") (1871)
- Doctoral advisor: Ernst Kummer; Karl Weierstrass
- Doctoral students: Johannes Franz Hartmann; Felix Hausdorff

Ernst Heinrich Bruns (4 September 1848 – 23 September 1919) was a German mathematician and astronomer, who also contributed to the development of the field of theoretical geodesy.

== Early life ==
Heinrich Bruns was born on 4 September 1848 in Berlin to Christian Gerhard Bruns, a landscape painter, and his wife, Caroline Henriette Hasse.

== Education and professional appointments ==
Bruns studied mathematics, astronomy, and physics at the University of Berlin during 1866–1871 under Ernst Kummer and Karl Weierstrass and earned a doctoral degree with a dissertation titled De proprietate quadam functionis potentialis corporum homogeneorum ("On the properties of a certain potential function of homogeneous bodies"). From 1872 to 1873 he was employed at the Pulkowa Observatory in Russia as a calculator. There he met and married Marie Wilhelmine Schleussner, who also worked as a calculator at the observatory. In 1873 he became an observer at the Observatory of Dorpat (now Tartu) in Estonia, where he remained until 1876. During this time he also worked as a lecturer at the University of Dorpat.

In 1876, Bruns was appointed an associate professor of mathematics at the University of Berlin. He also worked at the Prussian Military Academy and the Geodetic Institute of Potsdam. In 1882 he went to Saxony as a full professor of astronomy at the University of Leipzig and director of the Leipzig Observatory. That same year, he was elected a member of the academy of science Leopoldina.

== Work ==
Heinrich Bruns was mainly engaged in developing the theoretical side of "the shape of the Earth" (the title of one of his major works). The fields of potential theory and the study of equilibrium shapes owe many key results to him, including the Bruns formula.

For the study of astronomical refraction he developed an unusual method of calculating the vertical gradient of air temperature together with his assistant Felix Hausdorff. However, due to a lack of sufficiently accurate measurement methods this method has not been used in practice.

The 20th century's higher geodesy (a sub-field of geodesy concerned with measuring the earth on a global scale) as practiced by Karl Ledersteger was based on theories developed by Bruns, including "Bruns' polyhedron". This construct was envisioned as a world-spanning net. Satellite geodesy turned this thought experiment into a reality with the development of the GPS.

== Publications ==
- Über die Perioden der elliptischen Integrale erster und zweiter Ordnung (On the periods of elliptic integrals of first and second order). (Dorpat 1875)
- Die Figur der Erde (The shape of the Earth). (Berlin 1878)
- Über eine Aufgabe der Ausgleichsrechnung (On a problem of curve fitting). (Leipzig 1886)
- Über die Integrale des Vielkörperproblems (On the integrals of the many-body problem). (Leipzig 1887)
- Das Eikonal (The Eikonal). (Leipzig 1895)
