= Adam Żurowski =

Polish geodesist (1929–2016)

- Born: Adam Roman Żurowski; 3 March 1929; Lwów
- Died: 25 March 2016 (aged 87); Gdańsk, Poland
- Education: Gdańsk University of Technology
- Scientific career
- Fields: Geodesist

Adam Roman Żurowski (3 March 1929 – 25 March 2016) was a geodesist, Professor of technical sciences, Dean of the Faculty of Civil and Environmental Engineering (1990-1993), and Head of the Department of Geodesy (1985–1999) at the Gdańsk University of Technology.
