= Otto Eggert =

German surveyor and professor of Gdańsk University of Technology

Paul Hermann Otto Eggert
- Born: 4 February 1874; Tilsit
- Died: 20 January 1944 (aged 69), Gdańsk
- Education: Higher School of Agriculture in Berlin - Humboldt University in Berlin
- Scientific career
- Fields: geodesy, cartography, mathematics,

Paul Hermann Otto Eggert (born 4 February 1874 in Tilsit, d. January 20, 1944 in Gdańsk) was a German surveyor and professor of Gdańsk University of Technology (Technische Hochschule Danzig). He was also dean of the Faculty of Civil Engineering from 1909 to 1910 and from 1919 to 1920 and the first head of the Department of Geodesy at the Gdańsk University of Technology (1904-1921).

Eggert was a professor at Technische Universität Berlin and its rector in 1933–1934. From 1936 to 1939, he headed the Geodetic Institute in Potsdam (Preußisches Geodätisches Institute—nowadays Helmholtz Centre Potsdam, GFZ German Research Centre for Geosciences). In 1900 he received his doctorate in the field of surveying and environmental engineering at the Higher School of Agriculture in Berlin, now part of Humboldt University in Berlin (then: Study der Geodäsie und Kulturtechnik an der landwirtschaftlichen Hochschule Berlin), where he gained his first experience in the field of advanced mathematical, geodetic and astronomical research.

In 1920 he was voted member of the German Academy of Sciences Leopoldina.

== Publications (selected) ==
Eggert, O. (1900). Vergleichung der Ergebnisse des geometr. u. trigonometr. Nivellements nach d. durch v. Bauernfeind im J. 1881 ausgeführten Beobachtungen, Diss. Berlin, in: Zs. f. Vermessungswesen 29, 1900, p. 113 (dissertation)

Eggert, O. (1903). Hilfstafel z. Berechnung d. Richtungskoeffizienten f. Koordinatenausgleichungen.

Eggert, O. (1907). Einführung in die Geodäsie. Publisher: Bibliotheca Teubneriana (Introduction to geodesy).

Eggert, O. (1910). Lehrbuch des Tiefbaues: Erdbau, Stütz-, Futter-, Kai-und Staumauern, Grund-, Straßen-, Eisenbahn-und Tunnelbau - Vermessungskunde (Handbook of civil engineering: earthworks, retaining walls, curtain walls, quay walls and retaining walls, construction of foundations, construction of roads, railways and the construction of tunnels—surveying services)

Jordan, W., Reinhertz, C. J. C., Eggert, O. (1914). Handbuch der vermessungskunde. Publisher: JB Metzler (Handbook of geodesy).

Jordan, W., Eggert, O. (1935) Handbuch der Vermessungskunde. 1. Band: Ausgleichungs-Rechnung nach der Methode der kleinsten Quadrate; 2. Band/erster Halbband: Feld- und Landmessung; 2. Band/zweiter Halbband: Höhenmesswung, Tachymetrie, Photogrammerie und Absteckungen; 3. Band/erster Halbband: Landesvermessung, sphär. Berechnungen und astronomische Ortsbestimmung; 3. Band/zweiter Halbband: Sphäroidische Berechnungen, Konforme Abbildung des Erdellipsoids und Aufgaben der Erdmessung (Handbook of geodesy. 1. Alignment measurement method of least squares; 2–1. The measurement and valuation of land 2-2. Leveling measurements, Surveying, Photogrammetry and stake; 3–1. Geodesy, geometry on the sphere, astronomical observations; 3–2. The geometry of spherical, ellipsoid earth Conformal mapping and of geodesy tasks).
