= Éric Calais =

French seismologist

Éric Calais is a French geologist-geophysicist, born in 1964, internationally recognized practitioner of high-precision space geodesy (GPS and InSAR radar interferometry) and a pioneer in its applications to measure seismic deformations at the boundaries of tectonic plates and in their interiors. He has been a member of the French Academy of Sciences since 2017.

== Biography ==
Éric Calais graduated from the École normale supérieure de Saint-Cloud in 1987, holds a DEA in Earth Sciences from the University of Western Brittany (Brest, France) in 1988 and a doctorate from the University of Nice (France) in 1991. He was a postdoctoral researcher at the Scripps Institute of Oceanography (San Diego, United States) until 1995, a researcher at the CNRS (Nice, France) until 2001, a professor of geophysics at Purdue University (United States) until 2012, when he joined the École normale supérieure as a professor and head of the Earth Sciences Department.

He received the Jacob-Fallot-Jérémine Prize from the French Academy of Sciences in 2008 and the Frank Press Prize from the American Seismological Society in 2012. He is a member of the French Academy of Sciences and a senior member of the Institut universitaire de France.

== Research ==
Eric Calais' research interests are in the physics of geological processes in seismically active regions at the edge of tectonic plates or in their interior. He uses high-precision spatial geodetic techniques such as GPS and radar interferometry, which it combines with seismology and physical models of rock deformation. He has conducted field experiments around the world – for example in the Caribbean, Central Asia and East Africa – where he has deployed networks of geodetic sensors to study active deformation processes on spatial and temporal scales ranging from individual earthquakes or volcanic events to plate boundary deformation or tectonic plate movement.

Its work has established the framework for interpreting current seismicity in the Caribbean, Asia, the Western Mediterranean and East Africa. He identified the role played by the Earth's mantle in large-scale geological deformation in Africa and Asia and deciphered the complex mechanism of the Haiti earthquake in 2010. His work on earthquakes in intraplate regions leads to a paradigm shift with implications for seismic risk estimation in these contexts – including in metropolitan France. During his stay in Scripps with Bernard Minster, Eric Calais initiated the use of GPS to detect ionospheric disturbances triggered by earthquakes volcanoes and man-made explosions.

Eric Calais was heavily involved in the aftermath of the devastating 2010 earthquake in Haiti, both as a scientist and as an advisor to the Haitian government and its international partners He co-chaired the Working Group on the Haiti Earthquake at the United Nations in 2010 and worked in Haiti from 2010 to 2012 as a scientific advisor to the United Nations, where he promoted and applied disaster risk reduction practices in the country's reconstruction. He describes his experience in a book in French entitled Science et conscience dans le post-urgence du séisme d'Haïti.
