= Friedrich Hopfner =

Austrian geodesist, geophysicist and planetary scientist

- Born: 28 October 1881; Trutnov, Austria-Hungary (now Czech Republic)
- Died: 5 September 1949 (aged 67); Hintersteiner See, Austria
- Education: Charles University in Prague (German division)
- Awards: Oskar Freiherr von Rothschild-Preis; Seegenpreis
- Scientific career
- Fields: Geodesy, geophysics, astronomy
- Workplaces: Prague Observatory; Maritime Observatory in Trieste; Vienna Bureau of Geodesy; Austrian Geodetic Survey; Vienna University of Technology

Friedrich Hopfner (28 October 1881 in Trautenau – 5 September 1949 in Hintersteiner See) was an Austrian geodesist, geophysicist and planetary scientist.

As an officer of the Austro-Hungarian Empire he began his scientific work at the Bureau of Meteorology. In 1921, he became Chief Astronomer at the new Geodetic Survey of Austria (Federal Office for Metrology and Survey or Bundesamt für Eich- und Vermessungswesen). From 1936 to 1942 and from 1945 to 1949 he was a professor at the Vienna University of Technology (TU Wien) and over the 1948-49 term he was the university's rector.

== Life ==
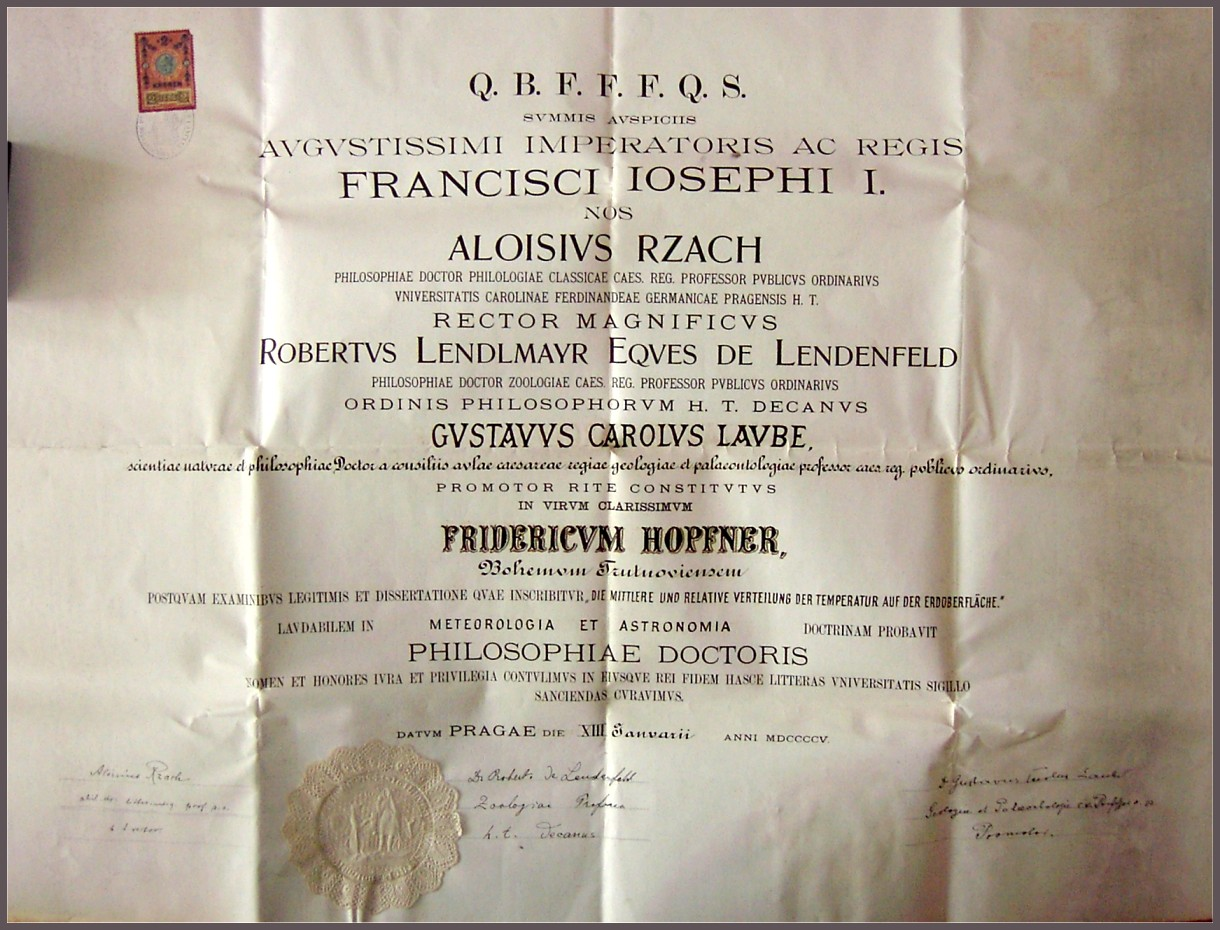
Doctoral diploma for Friedrich Hopfner from German Charles-Ferdinand University, 13 January 1905

He was born on 28 October 1881 in Trautenau, northern Bohemia (now Trutnov, Czech Republic). He studied mathematics, physics, geophysics and astronomy at the University of Prague and the Ludwig-Maximilians-Universität München between 1899 and 1904. In 1905 at the Charles University in Prague, he delivered his dissertation on "The average and relative distribution of temperature on the Earth's surface."

His first job was as an assistant at the Prague Observatory, and then at the Bureaux of Meteorology in Berlin, Innsbruck and Vienna. In 1908, he transferred to the Maritime Observatory in Trieste (now the Istituto Talassografico di Trieste or ITT), then in 1912 to the Bureau of Geodesy (Gradmessungsbüro) in Vienna.

During World War I he was head of the meteorological service for the Isonzo Army of Austria-Hungary. In 1921, he became Chief Astronomer at the new Geodetic Survey of Austria ("Bureau of Weights, Measures and Surveying" or Bundesamt für Eich- und Vermessungswesen).

In 1936, he was appointed Professor of Theoretical Geodesy and Spherical astronomy at the Vienna University of Technology, as successor to Richard Schumann. In autumn 1942, he declined Hitler's invitation into his newly created Academy of Sciences (Akademie der Wissenschaften) in Prague, and was forced into retirement, moving with his family to Schönbühel on the Danube, where he devoted himself exclusively to research. After the war he was restored to his position in Vienna, and was later elected Dean of the Faculty of Applied Maths and Physics.

His pleasant friendliness made him popular with colleagues and students, and in the 1948-49 term, he was voted Rector magnificus at the Technical High School of Vienna. In the last month of his incumbency, he drowned in a boating accident on the Hintersteiner See, near Kufstein.

== Work ==
From the very beginning of his career he made valuable contributions to astronomy, geodesy, geophysics and meteorology, in the applied fields as well as the theoretical, and published a great deal on all four subjects. He wrote three well-known textbooks.

=== Trajectories of planetoids ===
Hopfner's early work was mostly concerned with astronomy and meteorology. In collaboration with Johann Palisa, he determined the trajectories and ephemerides of a number of planetoids.

=== Mathematical foundations of a theory of climatology ===
In 1906, he began researching problems bordering both astronomy and geophysics, starting with the warming of the Earth by the Sun. We owe mainly to Hopfner the sharp distinction he made between the daily and seasonal average irradiation. In 1927, he went into the subject in more detail, laying out his discoveries in his Mathematical Foundations of an Astronomical Theory of Climatic Variation (Mathematische Grundlagen zu einer astronomischen Theorie der Klimaschwankungen), which won him the Seegenpreis.

=== Research on tides ===
His work at the Maritime Observatory in Trieste led him to study oceanographical questions, for example on tides and the determination of water levels in Trieste harbour, both very important practical problems.

=== Geodesy and geophysics ===
With his entry to the Gradmessungsbüro in 1921 he turned to geodesy and geophysics, in particular his work on the meridian arc measurement Großenhain-Kremsmünster-Pola, which detailed the use of comparisons of vertical deflections. Later he studied the important problem of the geoid (the Earth's shape), for example through the reduction of observations of weight and the subject known as isostasy (the study of gravitational equilibrium within the Earth). From the 1930s he concentrated on the study of the reference ellipsoid and phase diagrams, as well as the elliptical shape of the Equator, the level spheroid, and the triaxial Jacobi ellipsoid.

=== Contributions to Austrian science ===
Hopfner did pioneer work on the determination of geographical distances without the use of wires (the first employment of time-signals), as well as on gravimetry. His study of the Earth's magnetic field helped make a name for the ZAMG, or Central Institute for Meteorology and Geodynamics (Zentralanstalt für Meteorologie und Geodynamik) in Vienna.

== Memberships and responsibilities ==
- Member of the Austrian Academy of Sciences
- President of the Austrian Geodetic Commission (ÖKIE, now ÖGK)
- Correspondent to the Central Institute for Meteorology and Geodynamics (ZMG)
- Corresponding member of the German Society for Science and the Arts in the Republic of Czechoslovakia
- Member of the Mathematical Society of Vienna

== Awards ==
- 1912 Oskar Freiherr von Rothschild-Preis for astronomy, from the Vienna Academy of Sciences
- 1923 Seegenpreis from the Society for the Promotion of German Science, Art and Literature in Bohemia
- 1931 Given the title Hofrat (Counsellor)
- 1977 The Austrian Geodetic Commission begins awarding the Friedrich Hopfner-Medaille in his honour; it is given every four years for outstanding work in the field of geodesy

== Bibliography ==
Hopfner published a total of eighty-one works. In this partial list, the three textbooks are indicated with bold type.

- 1905 "Die Verteilung der solaren Wärmestrahlung auf der Erde", Monthly Weather Review (1906).
- 1907 "Untersuchungen über die Bestrahlung der Erde durch die Sonne mit Berücksichtigung der Absorption der Wärmestrahlen durch die Atmosphärische Luft nach dem Lambert'schen Gesetz. Erste Mitteilung: Analytische Behandlung des Problems." (pp. 167–234) in: Über das Vorkommender seltenen Erden auf der Sonne, Wien, Verlag Hölder
- 1913 "Die Gezeiten im Hafen von Triest", Wien, Verlag Hölder, in: Sitzungsberichte der Akademie der Wissenschaften, Math.-Nat. Klasse, Abt.2a; Bd.122, Heft 9, Wien
- 1922 "Der de:Meridianbogen Großenhain-Kremsmünster-Pola" (with R. Schumann), Astro-geodätische Arbeiten Österreichs, Neue Folge Bd.1
- 1927 Mathematische Grundlagen zu einer astronomischen Theorie der Klimaschwankungen
- 1927 Die Figur der Erde, Bundesverlag Wien
- 1931 "Neue Wege zur Bestimmung der Erdfigur." (Ergebnisse der Kosm. Physik Bd.1), Leipzig
- 1931 "Die Gezeiten der Meere" in Handbuch der Experimentalphysik
- 1933 "Die Gezeiten der festen Erde" in Gutenberg's Handbuch der Geophysik
- 1933 Physikalische Geodäsie (Mathematik und ihre Anwendungen, Bd. 14), Akademischer Druck, Leipzig
- 1936 "Figur der Erde, Dichte und Druck im Erdinnern" in Gutenberg's Handbuch der Geophysik Bd.1, pp. 139–308, Berlin
- 1949 Grundlagen der Höheren Geodäsie (Erdmessung), Wien, Springer-Verlag.
