= Zenith camera =

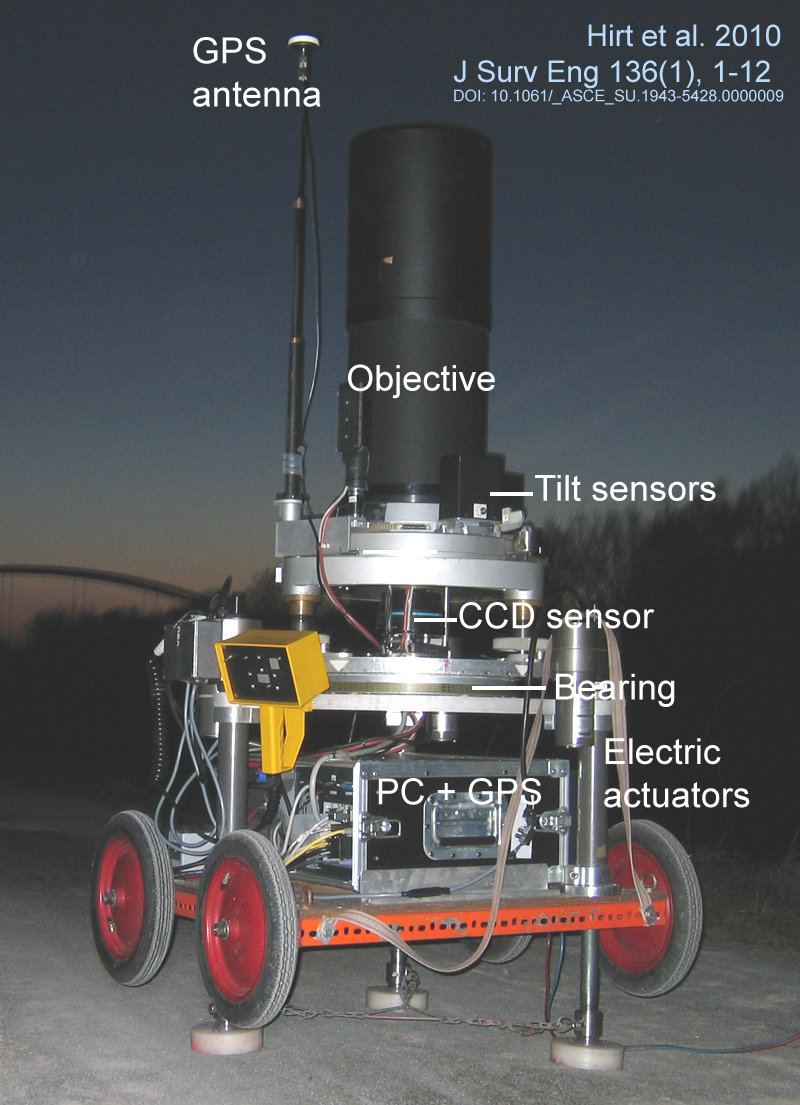
Digital zenith camera system of University of Hannover for the observation of the plumb line and vertical deflection

A zenith camera is an astrogeodetic telescope used today primarily for the local surveys of Earth's gravity field. Zenith cameras are designed as transportable field instruments for the direct observation of the plumb line (astronomical latitude and longitude) and vertical deflections.

== Instrument ==
A zenith camera combines an optical lens (about 10–20 cm aperture) with a digital image sensor (CCD) in order to image stars near the zenith. Electronic levels (tilt sensors) serve as a means to point the lens towards zenith. Zenith cameras are generally mounted on a turnable platform to allow star images to be taken in two camera directions (two-face-measurement). Because zenith cameras are usually designed as non-tracking and non-scanning instruments, exposure times are kept short, at the order of few 0.1 s, yielding rather circular star images. Exposure epochs are mostly recorded by means of the timing-capability of GPS-receivers (time-tagging).

== Data processing ==
Depending on the CCD sensor - lens combination used, few tens to hundreds of stars are captured with a single digital zenith image. The positions of imaged stars are measured by means of digital image processing algorithms, such as image moment analysis or point spread functions to fit the star images. Star catalogues, such as Tycho-2 or UCAC-3 are used as celestial reference to reduce the star images. The zenith point is interpolated into the field of imaged stars, and corrected for the exposure time and (small) tilt of the telescope axis to yield the direction of the plumb line.

== Accuracy and applications ==
If the geodetic coordinates of the zenith camera is known or measured, e.g., with a GPS-receiver, vertical deflections are obtained as result of the zenith camera measurement. Zenith cameras deliver astronomical coordinates and vertical deflections accurate to about 0.1 seconds of arc. Zenith cameras with CCD image sensors are efficient to collect vertical deflections at about 10 field stations per night. Zenith cameras have been used for accurate local surveys of Earth's gravity field (geoid, quasigeoid).

== See also ==
- Geodetic astronomy
- Geoid
- IERS
- Zenith telescope
