= Reino Antero Hirvonen =

Reino Antero Hirvonen (1908–1989) was a famous Finnish physical geodesist, also well known for contributions in mathematical and astronomical geodesy.

He worked at first at the Finnish Geodetic Institute under W.A. Heiskanen on gravimetric geoid determination, publishing his dissertation The Continental Undulations of the Geoid in 1934 on the determination of a global geoid model from only 4500 data points.

In 1950 he succeeded Heiskanen as Professor of Geodesy at the Helsinki University of Technology.

He also took an active interest in astronomy, acting from 1956 to 1964 as a vice president of the Finnish amateur astronomical society Ursa.

R.A. Hirvonen participated in the 1930s in the construction of triangulation towers, and measurements, for the first order triangulation of Finland. He also developed over the years many new mathematical algorithms for manual calculations (before the computer era), e.g., for calculating the Gauss-Krüger map projection.

In 1947 he led a team of Finnish scientists to Brazil to measure the distance between South America and Africa. (T.J. Kukkamäki was the leader of the team sent to, then, Gold Coast, Africa.) They succeed with measurements using a method based on observing from points in Brazil and Africa. They used the solar eclipse happening that year, which was visible in both Africa and South America. Using long focus film cameras and the most accurate available radio time signals for the solar eclipse measurements, they were able to calculate the distance between Africa and South America to a higher accuracy than ever before: 141 m.

1951–1952 and 1954–1955 Hirvonen lectured in the Department of Geodetic Science at The Ohio State University, in Columbus, Ohio (USA). He educated the students about navigation using the stars as reference points. Later it helped the USA to fly to the moon.

== Awards ==
In 1967 he received the Kaarina and Weikko A. Heiskanen Award (Ohio State University).

== Publications ==
- Hirvonen RA (1934) The continental undulations of the geoid. Ph.D dissertation, Publications of the Finnish Geodetic Institute 19, Helsinki.
- Kukkamäki TJ, RA Hirvonen (1947) The Finnish solar eclipse expeditions to the Gold Coast and Brazil 1947. Publications of the Finnish Geodetic Institute 44, Helsinki
- Hirvonen RA (1951) The motions of Moon and Sun at the solar eclipse of 1947 May 20. Publications of the Finnish Geodetic Institute 40, Helsinki.
- Hirvonen RA (1960) New Theory of the Gravimetric Geodesy. Publications of the Isostatic Institute of the IAG, 32, Helsinki.
- Hirvonen RA (1961) The Reformation of Geodesy. Journal of Geophysical Research, Vol. 66 no 5, pp. 1471–1478, doi:10.1029/JZ066i005p01471.
- Hirvonen RA (1962). On the statistical analysis of gravity anomalies. Publications of the Isostatic Institute of the IAG, 37, Helsinki.
- Hirvonen RA and H Moritz (1963). Practical computation of gravity at high altitudes. Report No. 27, Inst. Geod. Phot. Cart. Ohio State Univ.
- Hirvonen RA (1964) Praktische Rechenformeln für die dreidimensionale Geodäsie. Zeitschrift für Vermessungswesen 5, 145-151.
- Hirvonen RA (1971) Adjustments by Least Squares in Geodesy and Photogrammetry, Ungar, New York.
- Hirvonen RA (1972) Matemaattinen Geodesia, Teknillisen korkeakoulun ylioppilaskunta, Helsinki.
- Hirvonen RA (1976) Precise computation of the precession. Publications of the Finnish Geodetic Institute 80, Helsinki.
