= List of geodesists =

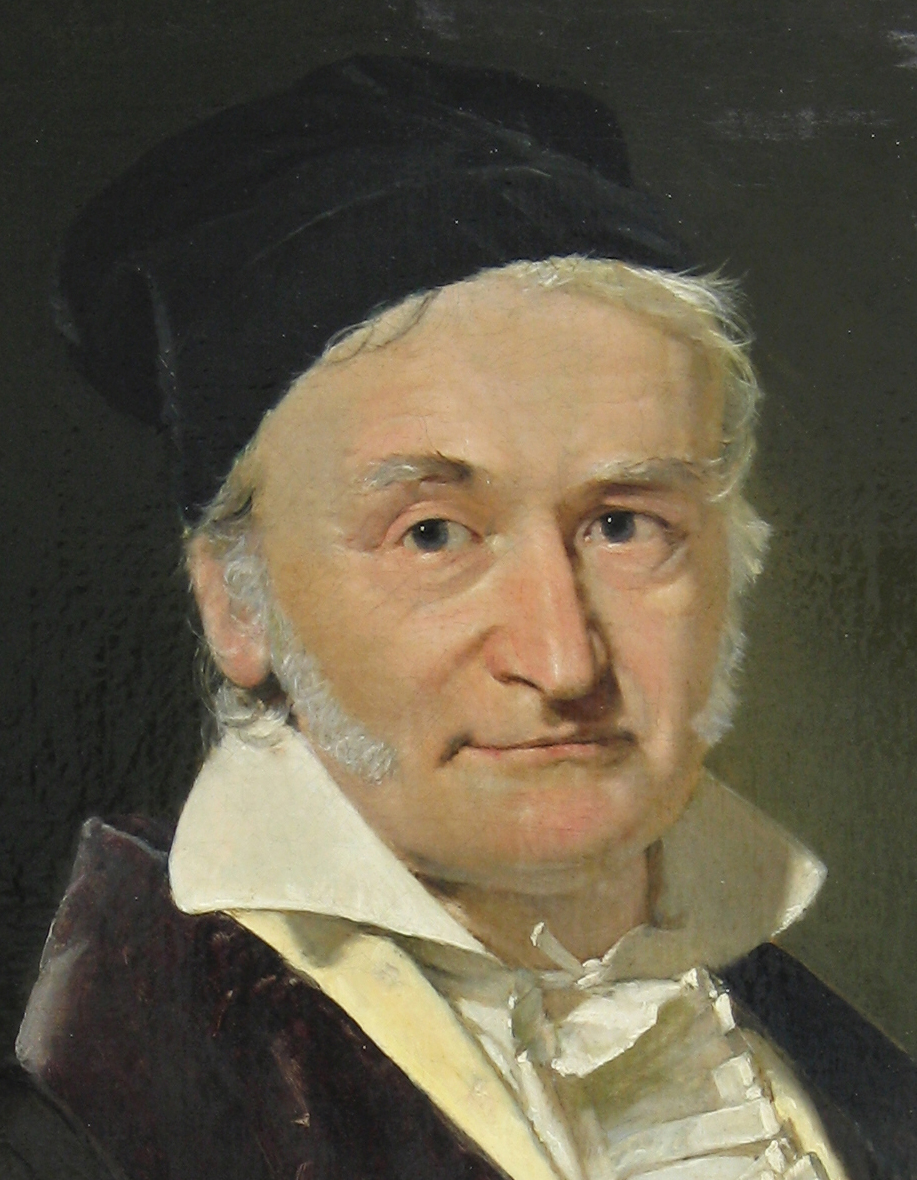
Carl Friedrich Gauss, one of the first modern geodesists

This is a list of geodesists, people who made notable contributions to geodesy, whether or not geodesy was their primary field. These include historical figures who laid the foundations for the field of geodesy.

== Geodesists before 1900 (arranged by date) ==
- Pythagoras, 580–490 BC (ancient Greece)
- Eratosthenes, 276–194 BC (ancient Greece)
- Hipparchus, c. 190–120 BC (ancient Greece)
- Posidonius, c. 135–51 BC (ancient Greece)
- Menelaus of Alexandria, c. AD 70–140 (ancient Greece)
- Claudius Ptolemy, c. AD 83–168 Roman Empire, (Roman Egypt)
- Al-Ma'mun, 786–833 (Iraq/Mesopotamia)
- Abu Rayhan Biruni, 973–1048 (Iran/Samanid Dynasty)
- Muhammad al-Idrisi, 1100–1166 (Arabia/Sicily)
- Regiomontanus, 1436–1476 (Germany/Austria)
- Abel Foullon, 1513–1563 or 1565 (France)
- Pedro Nunes, 1502–1578 (Portugal)
- Gerhard Mercator, 1512–1594 (Belgium/Germany)
- Snellius, (Willebrord Snel van Royen) 1580–1626 (Netherlands)
- Christiaan Huygens, 1629–1695 (Netherlands)
- Pierre Bouguer, 1698–1758 (France & Peru)
- Pierre de Maupertuis, 1698–1759 (France)
- Alexis Clairaut, 1713–1765 (France)
- Johann Heinrich Lambert, 1728–1777 (France)
- Roger Joseph Boscovich, 1711–1787 (Venetian Republic)
- Pierre Méchain, 1744–1804 (France)
- Jean Baptiste Joseph Delambre, 1749–1822 (France)
- Ino Tadataka, 1745–1818 (Japan)
- Georg von Reichenbach, 1771–1826 (Germany)
- Pierre-Simon Laplace, 1749–1827 (France)
- Adrien-Marie Legendre, 1752–1833 (France)
- Johann Georg von Soldner, 1776–1833 (Germany)
- George Everest, 1790–1866 (England/India)
- Friedrich Wilhelm Bessel, 1784–1846 (Germany)
- Heinrich Christian Schumacher, 1780–1850 (Germany/Russian Empire)
- Carl Friedrich Gauss, 1777–1855 (Germany)
- Friedrich Georg Wilhelm Struve, 1793–1864 (Russian Empire)
- Johann Jacob Baeyer, 1794–1885 (Germany)
- George Biddell Airy, 1801–1892 (England)
- Carl Christopher Georg Andræ, 1812–1893 (Denmark)
- Karl Maximilian von Bauernfeind, 1818–1894 (Germany)
- Wilhelm Jordan, 1842–1899 (Germany)
- Hervé Faye, 1814–1902 (France)
- George Gabriel Stokes, 1819–1903 (England)
- Carlos Ibáñez e Ibáñez de Ibero, 1825–1891 (Spain)
- Henri Poincaré, 1854–1912 (France)
- Alexander Ross Clarke, 1828–1914 (England)
- Charles Sanders Peirce, 1839–1914 (United States)
- Friedrich Robert Helmert, 1843–1917 (Germany)
- Heinrich Bruns, 1848–1919 (Germany)
- Loránd Eötvös, 1848–1919 (Hungary)
- Otto Hilgard Tittmann, 1850–1938 (United States)

== A ==
- Oscar S. Adams, 1874–1962 (United States)

== B ==
- Tadeusz Banachiewicz, 1882–1954 (Poland)
- Michael Bevis, 1954 (England)
- Arne Bjerhammar, 1917–2011 (Sweden)
- Giovanni Boaga, 1902–1961 (Italy)
- Guy Bomford, 1899–1996 (England)
- William Bowie, 1872–1940 (United States)

== C ==
- Éric Calais, 1964 (France)
- André-Louis Cholesky, 1875–1918 (France)
- Charles C. Counselman III (United States)
- Luís Cruls, 1848–1908 (Brazil)

== D ==
- James de Graaff-Hunter, 1881–1967 (United Kingdom/British Empire)

== F ==
- Irene Kaminka Fischer, 1907–2009 (United States)
- Buckminster Fuller, 1895–1983 (United States)

== H ==
- John Fillmore Hayford, 1868–1925 (United States)
- Veikko Aleksanteri Heiskanen, 1895–1971 (Finland/United States)
- Reino Antero Hirvonen, 1908–1989 (Finland)
- Friedrich Hopfner, 1881–1949 (Austria)
- Martin Hotine, 1898–1968 (England)

== J ==
- Harold Jeffreys, 1891–1989 (England)

== K ==
- William M. Kaula, 1926–2000 (United States)
- Geoffrey King, 1943–2026 (United Kingdom)
- Karl-Rudolf Koch, 1935 (Germany)
- Feodosy Nikolaevich Krasovsky, 1878–1948 (Russian Empire/USSR)

== L ==
- Walter Davis Lambert, 1879–1968 (United States)
- Laurence Patrick Lee, 1913–1985 (New Zealand)

== M ==
- Mikhail Sergeevich Molodenskii, 1909–1991 (Russia)

== O ==
- John A. O'Keefe, 1916–2000 (United States)

== P ==
- Georges Perrier, 1872–1946 (France)

== R ==
- Karl Ramsayer, 1911–1982 (Germany)

== S ==
- Hellmut Schmid, 1914–1998 (Switzerland)
- James C. Savage (United States)

== T ==
- Pierre Tardi, 1897–1972 (France)
- Peter J. G. Teunissen, 1957 (Netherlands)

== V ==
- Yrjö Väisälä, 1889–1971 (Finland)
- Petr Vaníček, 1935 (Canada)
- Felix Andries Vening-Meinesz, 1887–1966 (Netherlands)
- Thaddeus Vincenty, 1920–2002 (Poland)

== W ==
- Alfred Wegener, 1880–1930 (Germany/Greenland)
- Hans-Georg Wenzel, 1949–1999 (Germany)
- Gladys West, 1930–2026 (United States)

== See also ==
- Earth system science – Scientific study of the Earth's spheres and their natural integrated systems
- Geodesy – Science of measuring the shape, orientation, and gravity of Earth
- Geodynamics – Study of dynamics of the Earth
- History of geodesy
- List of geodesists
- Planetary science – Science of planets and planetary systems
