= Wilhelm Jordan (geodesist) =

German geodesist (1842–1899)

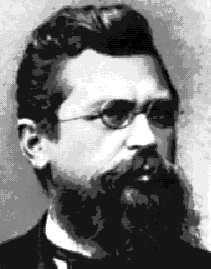
- Born: 1 March 1842; Ellwangen, Germany
- Died: 17 April 1899 (aged 57); Hanover, German Empire
- Known for: Gauss–Jordan elimination
- Scientific career
- Fields: Geodesy; Geometry
- Institutions: Technical University of Hannover

Wilhelm Jordan (1 March 1842, Ellwangen, Württemberg – 17 April 1899, Hanover) was a German geodesist who conducted surveys in Germany and Africa and founded the German geodesy journal.

== Biography ==
Jordan was born in Ellwangen, a small town in southern Germany. He studied at the polytechnic institute in Stuttgart and after working for two years as an engineering assistant on the preliminary stages of railway construction he returned there as an assistant in geodesy. In 1868, when he was 26 years old, he was appointed a full professor at Karlsruhe. In 1874 Jordan took part in the expedition of Friedrich Gerhard Rohlfs to Libya. From 1881 until his death he was professor of geodesy and practical geometry at the Technical University of Hannover. He was a prolific writer and his best known work was his Handbuch der Vermessungskunde (Handbook of Geodesy).

He is remembered among mathematicians for the Gauss–Jordan elimination algorithm, with Jordan improving the stability of the algorithm so it could be applied to minimizing the squared error in the sum of a series of surveying observations. This algebraic technique appeared in the third edition (1888) of his Textbook of Geodesy.

Wilhelm Jordan is not to be confused with the French mathematician Camille Jordan (Jordan curve theorem), nor with the German physicist Pascual Jordan (Jordan algebras).

== Gauss–Jordan elimination ==
Evidence suggests that B.-I. Clasen also developed the Gauss–Jordan elimination method (independently from Jordan), and both published the method in 1888. Carl Friedrich Gauss did not directly contribute to either derivation.
