= Vertical deflection =

Measure of the downward gravitational force's shift due to nearby mass

Earth's ellipsoid, geoid, and two types of vertical deflection. Ellipsoid of astro-geodetically oriented datum Geoid Gravimetrically-oriented ellipsoid

The vertical deflection (VD) or deflection of the vertical (DoV), also known as deflection of the plumb line and astro-geodetic deflection, is a measure of how far the gravity direction at a given point of interest is rotated by local mass anomalies such as nearby mountains. They are widely used in geodesy, for surveying networks and for geophysical purposes.

The vertical deflection are the angular components between the true zenith–nadir curve (plumb line) tangent line and the normal vector to the surface of the reference ellipsoid (chosen to approximate the Earth's sea-level surface). VDs are caused by mountains and by underground geological irregularities. Typically angle values amount to less than 10 arc-seconds in flat areas or up to 1 arc-minute in mountainous terrain.

== Components ==
The deflection of the vertical has a north–south component ξ (xi) and an east–west component η (eta). The value of ξ is approximately the difference between the astronomic latitude and the geodetic latitude (taking north latitudes to be positive and south latitudes to be negative); the latter is usually calculated by geodetic network coordinates. The value of η is approximately the product of cosine of latitude and the difference between the astronomic longitude and the longitude (taking east longitudes to be positive and west longitudes to be negative). When a new mapping datum replaces the old, with new geodetic latitudes and longitudes on a new ellipsoid, the calculated vertical deflections will also change.

=== Definitions ===
Suppose an observer at a point $P$ on Earth (topocentric position). Without loss of generality, let that point be on the Northern hemisphere. The point has astronomic latitude $\Phi$ and astronomic longitude $\Lambda$ . Outgoing directions from that point give points on a unit sphere, centered at $P$; each point on that sphere corresponds to a direction.

The direction parallel to the conventional Earth rotation axis gives the North pole direction$P_N$. The direction of outward normal to the geoid gives the astronomic zenith $Z_{A}$. The great circle connecting $Z_{A},P_N$ consists of the directions of the astronomic meridian.

The direction of outward normal to a reference ellipsoid gives the geodetic zenith $Z_{G}$. The point $P$ has geographic (geodetic) latitude $\phi$ and longitude $\lambda$. The great circle connecting $Z_{G},P_N$ consists of the directions of the geodetic meridian.

The spherical distance of $Z_{A},P_N$ (along the astronomic meridian) is $90^\circ -\Phi$. The spherical distance of $Z_{G},P_N$ (along the geodetic meridian) is $90^\circ -\phi$. The angle at $P_N$ between geodetic and astronomic meridian is $\Delta \lambda := \Lambda - \lambda$.

Draw a spherical perpendicular from $Z_{G}$ onto the astronomic meridian. It intersects the astronomic meridian in the pedal point (foot point) $F$.

Deflection of the vertical (blue) on the Gaussian directional sphere: Astronomic (pink) and ellipsoidal geodetic elements (green), quantities of deflection of the vertical (blue). Topocentric point P, astronomic and geodetic (elliptic) zeniths Z_{A} and Z_{G}, astronomic meridian (pink), geodetic meridian (green), pedal point (foot point) F of the geodetic zenith on the astronomic meridian, North pole direction P_{N}. Astronomic latitude/longitude $\Phi,\Lambda$, geodetic (ellipsoidal) latitude/longitude $\phi,\lambda$. Longitudinal points on the equator (Greenwich meridian L_{0}, geodetic meridian L_{G}, astronomic meridian L_{A}) with longitudes $0,\lambda,\Lambda$ North-South, East-West components $\chi,\eta$ of the deflection of the vertical and total deflection of the vertical $\theta.$

The components of the deflection of the vertical are:

- $\xi\dots$ North-South component, spherical distance $Z_{A}, F$, positive from $Z_{A}$ towards North (positive if $F$ is between $Z_{A}, P_N$).
- $\eta\dots$ East-West component, spherical distance $F,Z_{G}$, positive from the astronomic meridian towards East.

The total deflection of the vertical $\theta$ is the unsigned spherical distance of $Z_{A}, Z_{G}$.

=== Formulas ===
For explicit formulas consider the right angled spherical triangle $Z_{G},F,P_N$.

The spherical law of cosines gives for the hypothenuse
$$\cos(90^\circ - \phi)=\cos(90^\circ - \Phi + \xi) \cos(\eta)$$
By using $\cos(90^\circ -\phi)=\sin \phi$ and the approximations for small angles $\cos \eta \approx 1$, one obtains
$$\sin(\phi) \approx \sin(\Phi-\xi)$$
and therefore
$$\xi \approx \Phi - \phi.$$

The spherical law of sines gives
$$\frac{\sin(\eta)}{\sin(\Delta \lambda)} =\frac{\sin(90^\circ -\phi)}{\sin 90^\circ}$$
and with approximations for small angles $\sin \eta \approx \eta, \sin \Delta \lambda \approx \Delta \lambda$ one obtains
$$\eta \approx (\Lambda - \lambda) \cos \phi$$

For computing the total deflection of the vertical, consider the right angled spherical triangle $Z_{G}, F, Z_{A}$. Its spherical side lenghts are $\xi, \eta, \theta$. The sphericl law of cosines gives for the hypothenuse
$$\cos \theta = \cos \xi \cdot \cos \eta.$$
Squaring and using $\cos^2 = 1 - \sin^2$ gives
$$1 - \sin^2 \theta = 1 - \sin^2\xi - \sin^2 \eta + \sin^2 \xi \sin^2 \eta.$$
By neglecting the higher order last summand on the right hand side and by using the approximations $\sin \theta \approx \theta$, on obtains for the total deflection of the vertical
$$\theta^2 \approx \xi^2 + \eta^2$$

== Determination ==
The deflections reflect the undulation of the geoid and gravity anomalies, for they depend on the gravity field and its inhomogeneities.

Vertical deflections are usually determined astronomically. The true zenith is observed astronomically with respect to the stars, and the ellipsoidal zenith (theoretical vertical) by geodetic network computation, which always takes place on a reference ellipsoid. Additionally, the very local variations of the vertical deflection can be computed from gravimetric survey data and by means of digital terrain models (DTM), using a theory originally developed by Vening-Meinesz.

VDs are used in astrogeodetic levelling: as a vertical deflection describes the difference between the geoidal vertical direction and ellipsoidal normal direction, it represents the horizontal spatial gradient of the geoid undulations, i.e., the geoid slope or the inclination between geoid and reference ellipsoid.

In practice, the deflections are observed at special points with spacings of 20 or 50 kilometers. The densification is done by a combination of DTM models and areal gravimetry. Precise vertical deflection observations have accuracies of ±0.2″ (on high mountains ±0.5″), calculated values of about 1–2″.

The maximal vertical deflection of Central Europe seems to be a point near the Großglockner (3,798 m), the highest peak of the Austrian Alps. The approx. values are ξ = +50″ and η = −30″. In the Himalaya region, very asymmetric peaks may have vertical deflections up to 100″ (0.03°). In the rather flat area between Vienna and Hungary the values are less than 15", but scatter by ±10″ for irregular rock densities in the subsurface.

More recently, a combination of digital camera and tiltmeter have also been used, see zenith camera.

== Application ==
Vertical deflections are principally used in four matters:

1. For precise calculation of survey networks. The geodetic theodolites and levelling instruments are oriented with respect to the true vertical, but its deflection exceeds the geodetic measuring accuracy by a factor of 5 to 50. Therefore, the data would have to be corrected exactly with respect to the global ellipsoid. Without these reductions, the surveys may be distorted by some centimeters or even decimeters per km.
2. For the geoid determination (mean sea level) and for exact transformation of elevations. The global geoidal undulations amount to 50–100 m, and their regional values to 10–50 m. They are adequate to the integrals of VD components ξ,η and therefore can be calculated with cm accuracy over distances of many kilometers.
3. For GPS surveys. The satellites measurements refer to a pure geometrical system (usually the WGS84 ellipsoid), whereas the terrestrial heights refer to the geoid. We need accurate geoid data to combine the different types of measurements.
4. For geophysics. Because VD data are affected by the physical structure of the Earth's crust and mantle, geodesists are engaged in models to improve our knowledge of the Earth's interior. Additionally and similar to applied geophysics, the VD data can support the future exploration of raw materials, oil, gas or ores.

== Historical implications ==
Vertical deflections were used to measure Earth's density in the Schiehallion experiment.

Vertical deflection is the reason why modern prime meridian passes more than 100 m to the east of the historical astronomic prime meridian in Greenwich.

The meridian arc measurement made by Nicolas-Louis de Lacaille north of Cape Town in 1752 (de Lacaille's arc measurement) was affected by vertical deflection. The resulting discrepancy with Northern Hemisphere measurements was not explained until a visit to the area by George Everest in 1820; Maclear's arc measurement resurvey ultimately confirmed Everest's conjecture.

Errors in the meridian arc of Delambre and Méchain determination, which affected the original definition of the metre, were long known to be mainly caused by an uncertain determination of Barcelona's latitude later explained by vertical deflection. When some of the errors affecting the length of the metre where acknowledged in 1866, it became urgent to proceed to a new measurement of the French arc between Dunkirk and Perpignan. The operations concerning the revision of the French arc linked to Spanish triangulation were completed only in 1896. Meanwhile, the French geodesists had accomplished in 1879 the junction of Algeria to Spain, with the help of the geodesists of the Madrid Institute headed by the late Carlos Ibañez Ibáñez de Ibero (1825–1891). (Note: He had been president of the International Geodetic Association (now called International Association of Geodesy), first president of the International Committee for Weights and Measures, and one of the 81 initial members of the International Statistical Institute.)

Until Hayford ellipsoid was calculated in 1910, vertical deflections were considered as random errors. Plumb line deviations were identified by Jean Le Rond d'Alembert as an important source of error in geodetic surveys as early as 1756. A few years later, in 1828, Carl Friedrich Gauss proposed the concept of geoid.

== See also ==
- Deviation survey
- Gravity anomaly
- Isostasy
- Vertical direction
- Zenith
