= Geodetic astronomy =

Using stars to measure Earth

Geodetic astronomy or astronomical geodesy (astro-geodesy) is the application of astronomical methods into geodetic networks and other technical projects of geodesy.

== Applications ==
The most important applications are:

- Establishment of geodetic datum systems (e.g. ED50) or at expeditions
- apparent places of stars, and their proper motions
- precise astronomical navigation
- astro-geodetic geoid determination
- modelling the rock densities of the topography and of geological layers in the subsurface
- Monitoring of the Earth rotation and polar wandering
- Contribution to the time system of physics and geosciences

== Measuring techniques ==
Important measuring techniques are:

- Latitude determination and longitude determination, by theodolites, tacheometers, astrolabes or zenith cameras
- Time and star positions by observation of star transits, e.g. by meridian circles (visual, photographic or CCD)
- Azimuth determination
  - for the exact orientation of geodetic networks
  - for mutual transformations between terrestrial and space methods
  - for improved accuracy by means of "Laplace points" at special fixed points
- Vertical deflection determination and their use
  - in geoid determination
  - in mathematical reduction of very precise networks
  - for geophysical and geological purposes (see above)
- Modern spatial methods
  - VLBI with radio sources (quasars)
  - Astrometry of stars by scanning satellites like Hipparcos or the future Gaia.

The accuracy of these methods depends on the instrument and its spectral wavelength, the measuring or scanning method, the time amount (versus economy), the atmospheric situation, the stability of the surface resp. the satellite, on mechanical and temperature effects to the instrument, on the experience and skill of the observer, and on the accuracy of the physical-mathematical models. Changing weather or atmospheric conditions near the observation site can negatively affect atmospheric refraction in the zenithal direction, referred to as anomalous or zenithal refraction; anomalous refraction is considered to be the primary source of error in geodetic astronomy deflection data.

Therefore, the accuracy reaches from 60" (navigation, ~1 mile) to 0,001" and better (a few cm; satellites, VLBI), e.g.:

- angles (vertical deflections and azimuths) ±1" up to 0,1"
- geoid determination & height systems ca. 5 cm up to 0,2 cm
- astronomical lat/long and star positions ±1" up to 0,01"
- HIPPARCOS star positions ±0,001"
- VLBI quasar positions and Earth's rotation poles 0,001 to 0,0001" (cm...mm)

Astrogeodetic leveling is a local geoid determination method based on vertical deflection measurements. Given a starting value at one point, determining the geoid undulations for an area becomes a matter for simple integration of vertical deflection, as it represents the horizontal spatial gradient of the geoid undulation.

== See also ==
- Arc measurement — determining the curvature of Earth's surface by comparing astronomical observations to distance measurements
- Celestial navigation — determining a ship's position using astronomical observations
- Satellite geodesy
- Spherical astronomy
- Space geodesyET
- Stellar triangulation
- Triangulation (surveying)
- Zenith camera
