= Mudge =

Mudge is a surname. Notable people with the surname include:

== Politics ==
- Dirk Mudge (1928–2020), Namibian politician
- Geoffrey Mudge, English politician

== Religion ==
- Enoch Mudge (1776–1850), first Methodist minister reared in New England
- James Mudge (1844–1918), American Methodist Episcopal clergyman and writer
- Richard Mudge (1718–1763), English clergyman and composer
- Thomas H. Mudge (1815–1862), American Methodist Episcopal clergyman
- Zachariah Mudge (priest) (1694–1769), British clergyman
- Zachariah A. Mudge (1813–1888), American Methodist Episcopal clergyman

== Sports ==
- Angela Mudge (born 1970), British hill runner
- Dave Mudge (born 1974), Canadian football offensive lineman
- Katherine Mudge (1881–1975), British archer at the 1908 Olympic Games

== Other ==
- Benjamin Franklin Mudge (1817–1879), American lawyer, geologist and teacher
- Isadore Gilbert Mudge (1875–1957), American librarian
- John Mudge (1721–1793), English physician and recipient of the Copley Medal
- Thomas Mudge (horologist) (1715–1794), British horologist
- William Mudge (1762–1820), English artillery officer and surveyor
- Zachary Mudge (1770–1852), Officer in the British Royal Navy who served in the Vancouver Expedition

== See also ==
- Peiter Zatko (born 1970), known by his pseudonym "Mudge", hacker and computer security advisor
- Mudge Rose Guthrie Alexander & Ferdon, a now-defunct law firm which was based in New York City
- Mudge the Otter, an anthropomorphic otter in the Spellsinger series of fantasy novels
- The Mudge Boy, a 2003 American movie
- Cape Mudge band, one of the two main peoples of the Laich-kwil-tach
- Mudgie´s Deli, a restaurant in Corktown owned by Greg Mudge
