= Zachariah Mudge =

Zachariah Mudge is the name of:

- Richard Zachariah Mudge (1790–1854), English surveyor
- Zachary Mudge (1770–1852), also referred to as Zachariah, British navy officer, participated in the historic Vancouver Expedition
- Zachariah Mudge (priest) (1694–1769), British theologian, painted by Joshua Reynolds
- Zachariah A. Mudge (1813–1888), Methodist pastor in Massachusetts and the author of a biography of Abraham Lincoln
