= Principal Triangulation of Great Britain =

1791–1853 geodetic survey of Britain

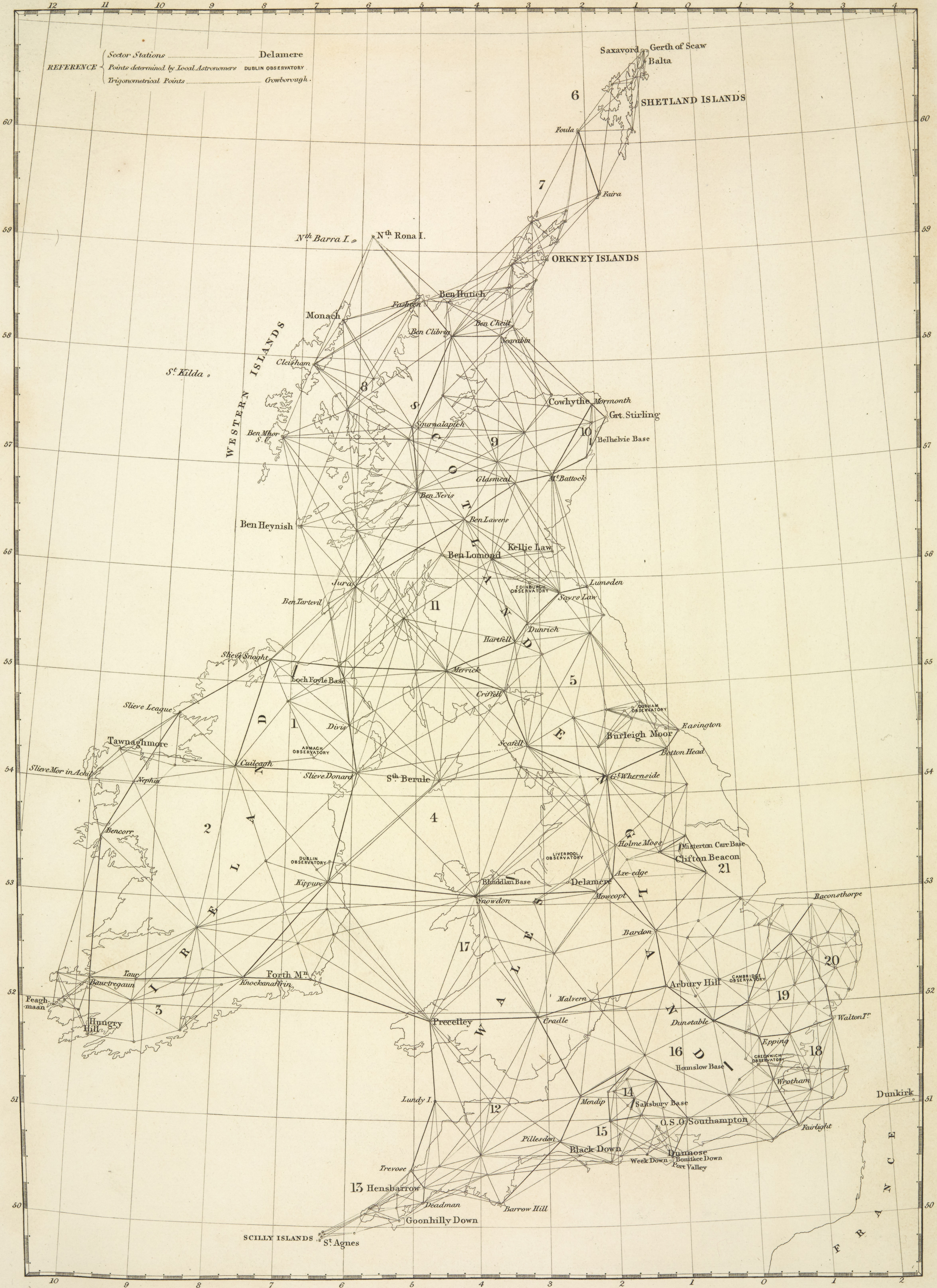
The principal triangulation mesh over Great Britain, Ireland and the Isle of Man.

The Principal Triangulation of Britain was the first high-precision triangulation survey of the whole of Great Britain and Ireland, carried out between 1791 and 1853 under the auspices of the Board of Ordnance. The aim of the survey was to establish precise geographical coordinates of almost 300 significant landmarks which could be used as the fixed points of local topographic surveys from which maps could be drawn. In addition there was a purely scientific aim in providing precise data for geodetic calculations such as the determination of the length of meridian arcs and the figure of the Earth. Such a survey had been proposed by William Roy (1726–1790) on his completion of the Anglo-French Survey but it was only after his death that the Board of Ordnance initiated the trigonometric survey, motivated by military considerations in a time of a threatened French invasion. Most of the work was carried out under the direction of Isaac Dalby, William Mudge and Thomas Frederick Colby, but the final synthesis and report (1858) was the work of Alexander Ross Clarke. The survey stood the test of time for a century, until the Retriangulation of Great Britain between 1935 and 1962.

== History ==
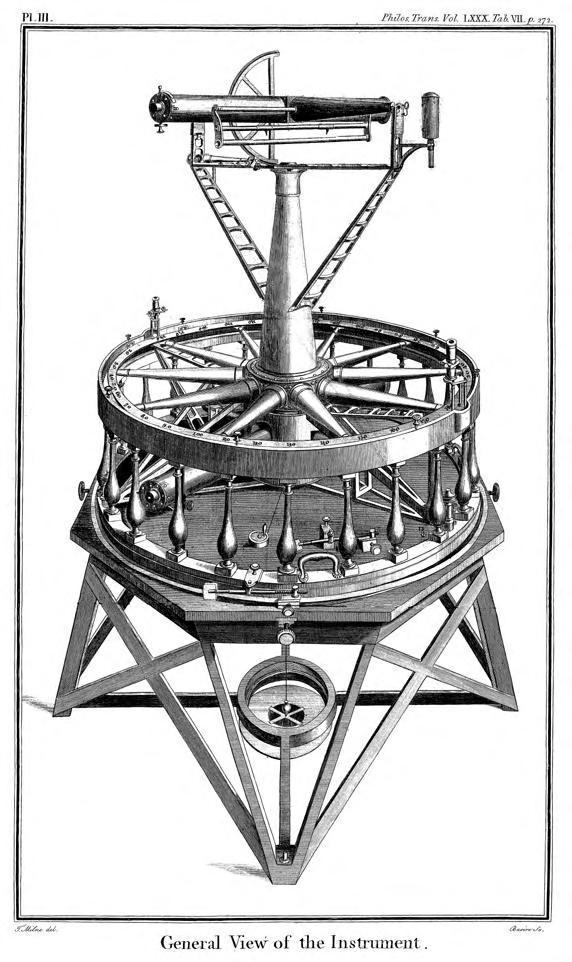
The first Ramsden theodolite as used by Roy. (Destroyed by bomb damage in 1941.)

In the aftermath of the Jacobite rising of 1745, the Duke of Cumberland (military commander against the rebels) – advised by Lieutenant-Colonel David Watson, a Deputy Quartermaster-General of the Board of Ordnance – recognised that there was a need for an accurate map of the Scottish Highlands. Watson initiated the necessary survey in 1747. Watson employed William Roy as a civilian assistant to carry out the bulk of the work. Subsequently Roy, having taken a commission in the Corps of Engineers as a "practitioner engineer", and having become a very competent surveyor, proposed (in a memorandum to the king dated 24 May 1766) a national survey which would be a plan for defence at a time when French invasions were threatened. (Note: The early history of the Ordnance Survey is covered in Owen & Pilbeam (1992) pp 3–14(true), 12–24(pdf), and Seymour (1980) pp. 1–20 (true), 15–35(pdf).) The proposal was rejected on grounds of expense.

Roy continued to lobby for a survey and his ambitions were realised to a certain extent by an unexpected development. In 1783 the French Academy of Sciences claimed that the latitude and longitude differences between the Royal Observatory, Greenwich and the Paris Observatory were incorrect, and it was proposed (to the Royal Society) that the differences could be reconciled by high precision triangulation over the intervening terrain. The Royal Society agreed and, jointly with the Board of Ordnance, they invited Roy to oversee the project.

=== Hounslow Heath baseline ===
Roy's first task (1784) was to measure a baseline between Hampton Poor House (51.42633°N 0.36617°W) and King's Arbour (51.4798°N 0.4503°W) on Hounslow Heath, a distance of just over 5 miles (8 km). (Note: A full account of the measurement of the Hounslow Heath baseline is given in Roy (1785). The appendix includes detailed maps and figures.) This was a painstaking process: three rods each of 20 ft. were supported on trestles and the ends aligned to an accuracy of a thousandth part of an inch. The first rod was then carried to the end of the third, an operation to be repeated 1,370 times. The first set of rods, from instrument maker Jesse Ramsden, was made of wood and, in the particularly wet weather of the Summer of 1784, these were found subject to warping and expansion. After delay of two weeks, Ramsden delivered a new set of rods, now made of solid glass tubing. Mounted in rigid wooden boxes with open ends, these had a sprung brass pin mounted against an ivory scale at one end, and this showed when the rods were joined exactly. The final measurement gave the length of the base as 27,404.01 feet (8,352.74 m).

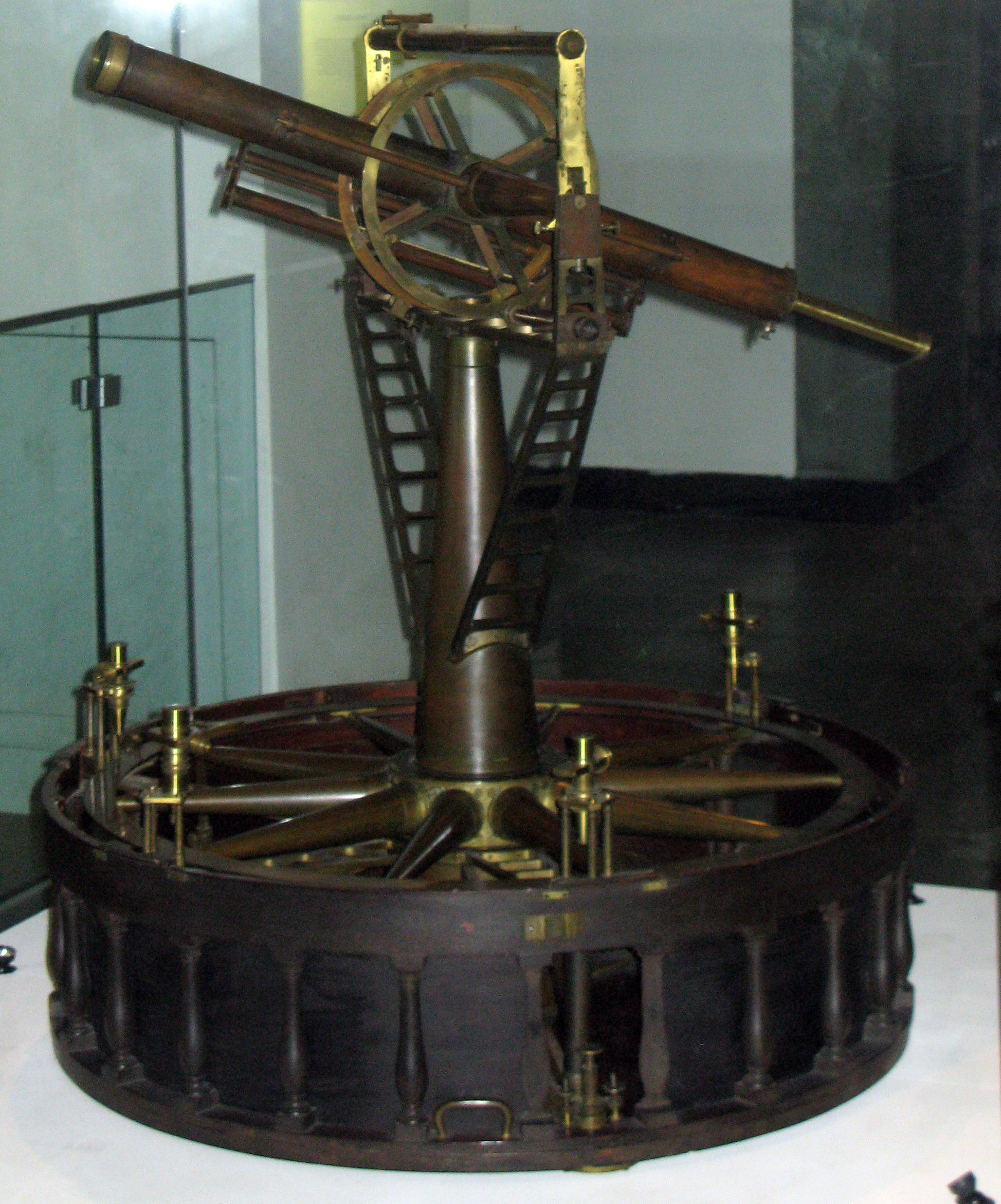
The second Ramsden theodolite as purchased by the Board of Ordnance. Now in the Science Museum, London

For the subsequent triangulation, (Note: The strategy of the triangulation is outlined in Roy (1787). The appendix includes detailed maps and figures.) Roy ordered a new theodolite from Jesse Ramsden. This Ramsden theodolite, delivered in 1787, for the first time divided angular scales accurately to within a second of arc. (Note: A full description of the first Ramsden theodolite is given in Roy (1790). The appendix includes detailed figures.) (Note: The theodolite constructed for Roy by Ramsden is called the Royal Society theodolite. See Insley (2008) The Great Theodolites) The theodolite was the largest ever constructed but, despite its massive size, it was carried from London to the Channel coast and employed on hills, steeples and a moveable tower. At each location the angles to other vertices of the triangulation mesh were measured many times, often at night time using newly devised lights. Finally the angle data was used to calculate the sides of the triangles by using spherical trigonometry.

The final results were inconclusive, for triangulation was inferior to the precision of astronomical measurements, but the survey paved the way for all future work in terms of high precision measurements of length and angle, together with the techniques of calculating on an ellipsoidal surface. In his final report, published posthumously, Roy once again pressed for the extension of the survey to the rest of Britain. Charles Lennox, 3rd Duke of Richmond, as Master of the Board of Ordnance from 1782, viewed Roy's work with great interest. At the same time he was acutely aware that Britain, lacking a national survey, was falling behind the standards of many other European countries. Moreover, the renewed threat of French invasion made him alarmed at the lack of accurate maps, particularly of the southern counties. Consequently, in 1791, he put into action Roy's plan for the extension of the survey. The catalyst was the sudden availability of a new improved Ramsden theodolite (Note: The Ramsden theodolite purchase by Richmond is referred to as The Board of Ordnance theodolite.) which had been intended for the East India Company. The purchase of this instrument on 21 June 1791 by the Board is taken as the inauguration of the Ordnance Survey. The very next day Richmond appointed Isaac Dalby as its first employee, with a brief to extend Roy's survey. (Note: Dalby was a civilian mathematician who had assisted Roy from 1787. See Owen & Pilbeam (1992) p11(true), 21(pdf), and Seymour (1980) p22(true),36(pdf).) In the following month Richmond appointed two officers of the Royal Artillery, Major Edward Williams and Lieutenant William Mudge, as directors.

== Re-measurement of the Hounslow baseline ==
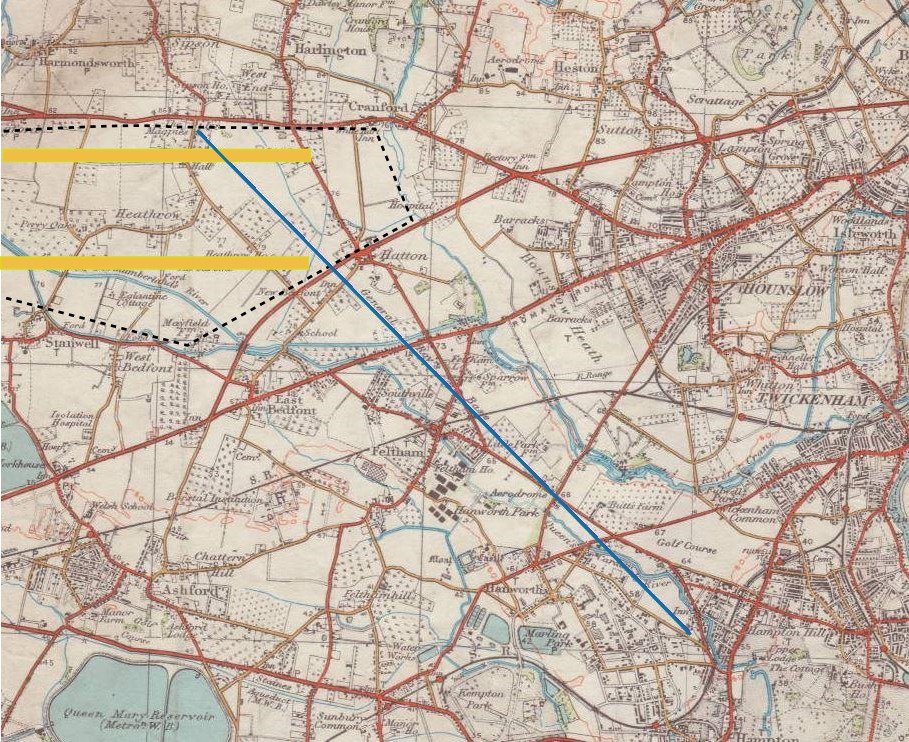
General Roy's baseline: map as about 1935

For the 1784 measurement of the original baseline across Hounslow Heath, Roy had ordered three deal rods cut from a new mast in the Admiralty dock yards. These were intended to be used for the precision measurement but Roy also ordered a 100 ft steel chain from Ramsden which could be used for a quick preliminary measurement. The deal rods proved ineffective because of their changes with humidity and they were replaced with glass rods for the final measurement; however Roy observed that the chain itself was just as accurate as the rods. For this reason when Richmond ordered Mudge to remeasure the Hounslow base in Summer of 1791, as a first step in extending the triangulation, the survey started by remeasuring the base with two new 100 ft (30 m) chains, again made by Ramsden. The second chain was kept unused as a reference against which any stretching of the first would be detected.

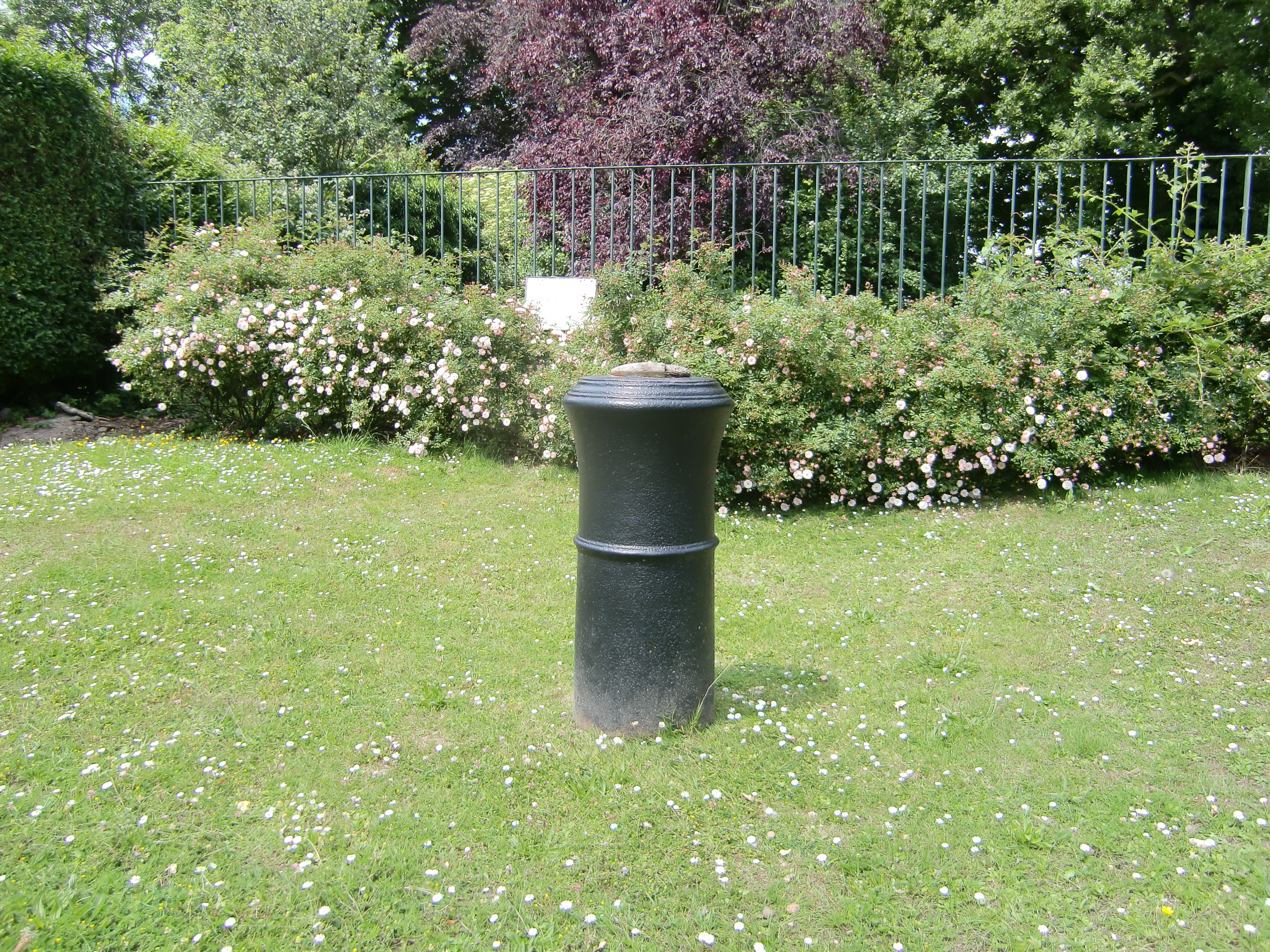
South East end of the Baseline

The process of measurement was exceedingly precise. Since the ground was undulating with varying slopes along the length of the base, the measurement was carried out over 26 stages, the chains for any one stage being constrained to a perfectly straight line (at a tension of 56 pounds (25 kg)), in coffers with many intermediate supports. These hypotenuse measurements were then projected to the horizontal. Furthermore, the temperature varied from day to day and each measurement was corrected to the length that a chain would take at 62 °F (17 °C). Finally, the length of the base was reduced to its projection at sea level using the height of the south base above the Thames and the fall in the Thames down to its estuary. The final result was approximately 2.75 inches (70 mm) less than that of Roy; the mean value of 27,404.2 ft (8,352.80 m) was taken for the baseline. The modern value, derived from GPS, is 27,376.8 ft (8,344.4 m), a difference of 27.4 ft (8.4 m). (Note: Roy and Mudge treated their measurements as hypotenuses, which they then projected onto an horizontal plane at sea level; the global positioning system uses WGS84 3-dimensional coordinates. In 1991 Peter McMaster, director of the Ordnance Survey, warned that because the OS grid had its origin and meridians chosen specifically for Britain, whereas GPS is for worldwide use, discrepancies were possible.)

== Enlargement ==
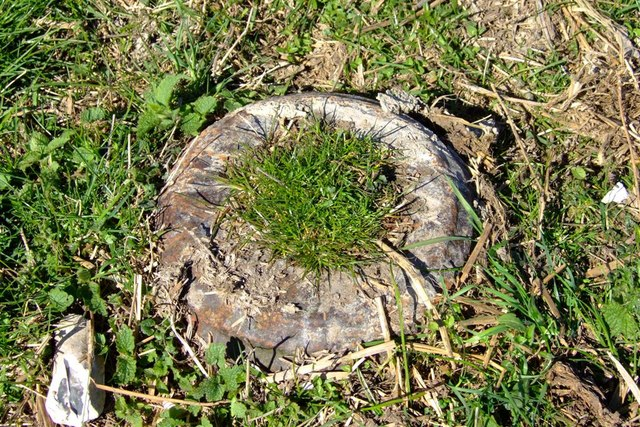
The south-west end of the "Salisbury Base" was marked with a cannon, mounted vertically in the ground. On Ordnance Survey published maps it is shown as "Gun, end of base"

Using an improved model of Ramdsden's theodolite, Mudge extended the triangulation eastwards towards London and Kent, where the threat of invasion seemed greatest, and then along the coastal counties westward as far as Bristol and Cornwall. As the survey proceeded westwards, Mudge decided to check its accuracy by measuring a new baseline between two points established by the triangulation. He chose Salisbury Plain, measuring between a point near Old Sarum Castle (51.0955°N 1.7984°W) and Beacon Hill, near Bulford (51.1835°N 1.7221°W), in June 1794. The difference between the distance calculated by triangulation and that established by measurement was less than one inch (over a length of more than seven miles). The result verified not only the accuracy of the triangulation, but also the measurement of the original baseline on Hounslow Heath. After remeasurement in 1849 the "Salisbury Base" (rather than the original base on Hounslow Heath) provided the baseline for subsequent triangulation.

In 1799, however, Mudge was directed to transfer his undertaking to Essex, where "interior surveyors" waited to start on maps of the vulnerable coastline, again against the threat of invasion. When, later that year, he was released he continued his progress into Gloucestershire, and as far north as Coventry. Now joined by an assistant, Thomas Colby, Mudge completed the triangulation of Wales by 1811. The northern coast of Scotland was gained in 1816 and the Shetland Isles in 1817. The Orkney Islands and Western Isles were incorporated by 1822.

== Corrections ==
During subsequent triangulation, errors due to atmospheric refraction, deflection of plumb-bobs, temperature, and the spherical nature of the earth (meaning there were more than 180 degrees in a triangle) were all allowed for.

== 1828 confirmation ==
By 1827 the survey had adopted brass-and-iron compensation bars for measurements; the two metals were fitted loosely together so that their different rates of thermal expansion could be measured with microscopes and the variation overall allowed for. To check the accuracy of the first triangulation, and to confirm that it had been accurately extended across St George's Channel to Ireland, in 1827 Colby directed William Yolland to measure a new baseline, using the new instruments, along the shore of Lough Foyle. This was completed in the following year. After allowing for Britain's redefinition of the foot in 1824 (the old standard foot was used for the English survey; the new in Ireland), the new 8-mile (13 km) baseline, as measured, differed from the previous one calculated from triangulation by only 5 inches (130 mm).

== New national triangulation ==
In 1909 it was decided that, because of improvements in the design of theodolites, a test of angles recorded in the previous triangulation was necessary. The baseline at Lossiemouth, Morayshire, was selected. The length of the base (measured using the new invar steel tapes) was found to correspond satisfactorily with the previous value obtained through triangulation, and that any new survey would not vary significantly from the one completed in the previous century. In 1935, however, General Malcolm MacLeod, OS director, decided that a new national triangulation, the Retriangulation of Great Britain, was required. This was not because of any deficiency in the existing principal triangulation, but because some secondary, local triangulations were not of a standard where they could be reconciled within the existing national framework.

== See also ==
- Ordnance Survey
- Ordnance Survey Ireland#History
- Ordnance Survey Drawings
- Great Trigonometrical Survey (Indian subcontinent)
- Public Land Survey System (United States)

== Bibliography ==
- Hewitt, Rachel (2010). Map of a Nation. London: Granta. ISBN 978-1-84708-254-1. OCLC 743473376.
- Insley, Jane (2008). The Tale of the Great Theodolites (PDF). Working Week on Integrating the Generations. Sweden.
- James, Henry (1858). Ordnance Trigonometrical Survey of Great Britain and Ireland, Account of the Principal Triangulation. Southampton, England: Ordnance Survey.
- Knowles, Michael (2003). "The French Connexion – Between English and French Map Surveys". Proceedings of the Bath Royal Literary and Scientific Institution. 7. Archived from the original on 2007-10-18.
- Mudge, William; Dalby, Isaac; Williams, Edward (1794). "An Account of the Trigonometrical Survey Carried on in the Years 1791, 1792, 1793, and 1794". Philosophical Transactions of the Royal Society. 84: 414–622. doi:10.1098/rstl.1795.0023 – via Archive.org.
- Mudge, William (1801). An account of the operations carried out for accomplishing a trigonometrical survey of England and Wales . Volume II, 1797–1799. W. Faden. OCLC 10644787.
- Portlock, Joseph Ellison (1853). "Memoir of the late Major-General Colby, Royal Engineers". The Duties of the Corps of Royal Engineers. Vol. III. London: John Wheal.
- Owen, Tim; Pilbeam, Elaine (1992). Ordnance Survey, map makers to Britain since 1791. Southampton: Ordnance Survey (HMSO). ISBN 9780319002490. OCLC 28220563.
- Roy, William (1785). "An Account of the Measurement of a Base on Hounslow-Heath". Philosophical Transactions of the Royal Society of London. 75: 385–480. doi:10.1098/rstl.1785.0024.
- Roy, William (1787). "An Account of the Mode Proposed to be Followed in Determining the Relative Situation of the Royal Observatories of Greenwich and Paris". Philosophical Transactions of the Royal Society of London. 77: 188–226. doi:10.1098/rstl.1787.0019. S2CID 186214773.
- Roy, William (1790). "An Account of the Trigonometrical Operation, Whereby the Distance between the Meridians of the Royal Observatories of Greenwich and Paris Has Been Determined". Philosophical Transactions of the Royal Society of London. 80: 111–254. doi:10.1098/rstl.1790.0015. S2CID 186211548.
- Seymour, W.A., ed. (1980). A History of the Ordnance Survey (PDF). Folkestone: Wm Dawson & Sons.
- Todhunter, Isaac (1873). A history of the mathematical theories of attraction and the figure of the earth from the time of Newton. Vol. II. London: Macmillan. OCLC 833751892.
- Welfare, Humphrey (2023). General William Roy, 1726-1790 Father of the Ordnance Survey. Edinburgh University Press. ISBN 9781399505802.
