= Thomas Mudge =

Thomas Mudge is the name of:

- Thomas H. Mudge (1815–1862), American Methodist Episcopal clergyman
- Thomas Mudge (horologist) (1715–1794), British watchmaker and the inventor of the lever escapement
