= William Mudge (Royal Navy officer) =

British Royal Navy commander

- Born: c. 1796
- Died: 20 July 1837; Howth
- Occupation: Royal Navy commander

William Mudge (c. 1796 – 20 July 1837) was a British Royal Navy commander.

== Biography ==
Mudge was born in about 1796. He was the third son of Major-general William Mudge. He was promoted to be lieutenant in the navy on 19 February 1815. In August 1821 he was appointed first lieutenant of the Barracouta, with Captain Cutfield, employed on the survey of the east coast of Africa under Captain William Fitzwilliam Owen. He was afterwards moved into the Leven under the immediate command of Owen, and on 4 October 1825 was promoted to the rank of commander. He was then appointed to conduct the survey of the coast of Ireland, on which he was employed till his death at Howth on 20 July 1837. He was buried with military honours in the ground of the cathedral at Howth on 24 July.

In addition to 'Sailing Directions for Dublin Bay and for the North Coast of Ireland,' which were officially published, 1842, Mudge contributed several papers (mostly hydrographic) to the 'Nautical Magazine;' and to the Society of Antiquaries, in November 1833, an interesting account of a prehistoric village found in a Donegal bog (Archæologia, xxvi. 261). He married in 1827 Mary Marinda, only child of William Rae of Blackheath, by whom he had a large family. He has been confused with his father (e.g. in Brit. Mus. Cat.), whose work, it will be seen, was entirely geodetic.
