= Ethel Baker =

American politician

Ethel B. Baker

Member of the Maine House of Representatives
- In office 1959–1974
- Preceded by: Clifford K. Hatfield

Personal details
- Party: Republican

Ethel B. Baker (May 21, 1906 - February 25, 1990) was an American politician from Maine. Baker, a Republican from Orrington, Maine, served in the Maine House of Representatives from 1959 to 1974.
