= HMS Fly (1776) =

Naval sloop (1776–1802

History

Great Britain
- Name: HMS Fly
- Ordered: 1 August 1775
- Builder: George White, Sheerness Dockyard
- Cost: £8,694 8s 4d
- Laid down: January 1776
- Launched: 14 September 1776
- Commissioned: July 1776
- In service: 1776–1802
- Fate: Foundered off Newfoundland, January 1802

General characteristics
- Class & type: Swan-class ship sloop
- Tons burthen: 30238/94 (bm)
- Length: Gun deck: 96 ft 7 in (29.4 m); Keel: 78 ft 11 1/2 in (24.1 m)
- Beam: 26 ft 10 in (8.2 m)
- Draught: Unladen: 6 ft 9 in (2.1 m); Laden: 10 ft 9 in (3.3 m)
- Depth of hold: 12 ft 10 in (3.9 m)
- Complement: 125
- Armament: Initially: 14 × 6-pounder guns + 16 swivel guns; Post-October 1779: 16 × 6-pounder guns; Post-1780: Gun deck: 16 × 6-pounder guns + 2 × 12-pounder carronades; QD: 4 × 12-pounder carronades

HMS Fly was a Swan-class ship sloop of the Royal Navy, launched on 14 September 1776. She performed mainly convoy escort duties during the French Revolutionary Wars, though she did capture three privateers. She foundered and was lost with all hands early in 1802.

== Design ==
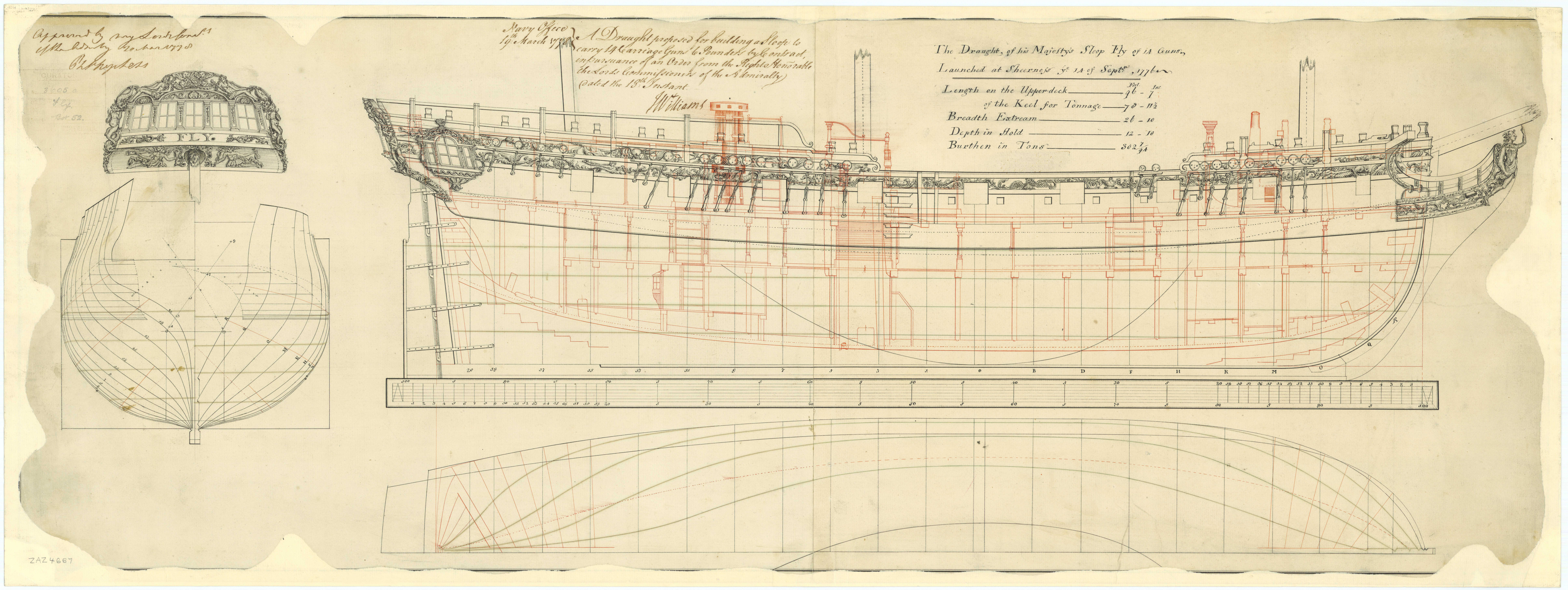
Lines of Fly

Between 1766 and 1780 the Admiralty had 25 vessels of her class built to a design by Sir John Williams. On 1 August 1775 the Admiralty ordered her built at Sheerness Dockyard, and she was the sixth one ordered. Her keel was laid in January 1776, she was launched on 14 September, and completed on 19 October.

The Swan class sloops were unusually attractive for the class of vessel. Not only did they have sleek hull lines but they also carried an unusual amount of decoration for their size. They were built just before the Admiralty issued orders that all vessels (especially lesser rates and unrated vessels) have minimal decoration and carvings to save on costs, due to the seemingly ever-continuing war with France and other nations.

== 1776–1783 ==
Fly was commissioned under Commander Edward Garner in July 1776 and he remained in command until 1778. In December 1776 she sailed for the Leeward Islands, though by 1779 she was in the North Sea. In October 1779 Commander Billy Douglas took command for the North Sea. His replacement, c. August 1781, was Timothy Kelly.

On 6 September 1782 Fly encountered and captured L'Escamoteur, a 14-gun French privateer. The privateer was accompanied by two vessels that she had taken as prizes, a merchant brig and a sloop. Fly escorted all three vessels to Yarmouth where they were transferred to Admiralty control.

Fly was paid off in May 1783.

== French Revolutionary Wars ==
In June 1794, five days after the capture of Port-au-Prince, she came under the command of Richard Hussey Moubray, previously first lieutenant of Magicienne, who had assisted in the landing of troops. Moubray then took Captain Rowley and Lieutenant Colonel Whitelocke, who were carrying the dispatches, to England.

In December 1794 Fly escorted the Duke of York from Helvoetsluys to Harwich.

Fly was at Plymouth on 20 January 1795 and so shared in the proceeds of the detention of the Dutch naval vessels, East Indiamen, and other merchant vessels that were in port on the outbreak of war between Britain and the Netherlands. The Dutch vessels consisted of two line-of-battle ships, one frigate, two sloops-of-war, nine East Indiamen, and about sixty other vessels. Afterwards, Fly escorted merchant vessels in the Channel and between Britain and Gibraltar.

On 22 August 1796 Fly captured the French privateer Furet some seven leagues off Portland. Furet was a small privateer armed only with five swivels and carried a crew of 27 men.

In January 1796 Commander Henry S. Butt took command, followed in May 1797 by Commander William Cumberland, and in November 1798 by Commander Zachary Mudge. On 4 February 1799 Fly pursued and captured the French privateer cutter Gleneur off Portland. Gleneur carried six 4-pounder guns and 32 men and was under the command of Emanuel Tone. She had sailed from Cherbourg the night before, where British frigates had chased her two days earlier. On her previous cruise Gleneur had successfully cut out of Torbay Anna of Hull, Hopwell of Lisbon, and Lucy of Whitehaven. Hopewell was later recaptured.

On 21 May 1800 Fly arrived at Portsmouth from Halifax with dispatches from the Duke of Kent. She made the crossing in three weeks, having narrowly escaped hitting an immense island of ice on the edge of the Newfoundland Banks. Fly had been sailing in a thick fog at dusk when lookouts suddenly spotted the iceberg about 120 yards ("a cable's length") in front of her. Fly was moving at about nine knots but a swift turn of the helm enabled her to clear the south end of the iceberg by half a cable's length.

Fly sailed on 28 June 1800 and returned to Portsmouth on 7 July together with Harpy. They brought with them a Prussian vessel carrying a cargo of salt. Fly then sailed again, returning on 26 July from a cruise off Cherbourg. Two days later she set off again for Cherbourg.

Gales forced her to quit Cherbourg. She cleared La Hogue with difficulty but nevertheless captured the French privateer cutter Trompeur there. Trompeur had been out two days and taken nothing.

In November 1800 Fly came under the command of Commander Thomas Duvall. She sailed from Portsmouth on 7 January 1801 with a convoy of 13 vessels for the coast of Africa. On the way they encountered a French squadron of five sail of the line and two frigates, leading Fly to order the convoy to scatter. On 19 March a letter arrived in Plymouth from Fly reporting that ten of the vessels had made it safely to Africa. (The Naval Chronicle reported that the three others had aborted their voyage, returning safely to Britain.) Fly herself returned on 20 August.

Five days later, Mr William McLeod, Fly's purser faced a court martial on board Gladiator in Portsmouth Harbour. The charges were drunkenness, neglect of duty, and failure to supply Fly with stores. The court martial board found McLeod guilty and ordered him dismissed from the Navy.

== Fate ==
On 17 September 1801 Fly left Portsmouth as escort to a convoy for Newfoundland. She foundered and was lost with all hands off Cape Flattery, Newfoundland in January 1802.

== Postscript ==
The original plans of Fly still exist. Victory Models, Euromodels, and Amati all offer 1:64 scale wooden model kits but they are not accurate.
