= Orrington, Maine =

Town in Maine, United States

- Town
- Seal

- Location within Maine Location within the United States
- Coordinates: 44°43′17″N 68°46′21″W
- Country: United States
- State: Maine
- County: Penobscot

Area
  - Total: 27.33 sq mi (70.78 km^{2})
  - Land: 24.99 sq mi (64.72 km^{2})
  - Water: 2.34 sq mi (6.06 km^{2})
- Elevation: 302 ft (92 m)

Population (2020)
  - Total: 3,812
  - Density: 153/sq mi (58.9/km^{2})
- Time zone: UTC-5 (Eastern (EST))
  - Summer (DST): UTC-4 (EDT)
- ZIP code: 04474
- Area code: 207
- FIPS code: 23-55680
- GNIS feature ID: 582652
- Website: orrington.org

Orrington is a town on the Penobscot River estuary in Penobscot County, Maine, United States. The population was 3,812 at the 2020 census.

== History ==
Orrington was originally part of Condustiegg or Kenduskeag Plantation, which also included the present-day cities of Bangor and Brewer. Orrington was incorporated as a town in 1788 with its major village at Brewer, then called "New Worcester". Bangor incorporated three years later in 1791. Brewer broke away from Orrington in 1812 to form a separate town.

The name "Orrington" reportedly resulted from a spelling mistake. The settlers intended to name it "Orangetown" after Orangetown, Maryland, but it was written on the record-books in distant Massachusetts, of which Maine was then a territory, as "Orrington". "Orring" was a reasonable phonetic rendering of "orange" before the standardization of English spelling.

For much of its town history Orrington was a shipping and ship building community. The Boston & Penobscot Shipbuilding Company yard was on Mill Creek, South Orrington. Ice cut from the Penobscot River was shipped as far away as the British West Indies.

== Geography ==
Orrington lies on the estuary of the Penobscot River. According to the United States Census Bureau, the town has a total area of 27.33 square miles (70.78 km^{2}), of which 24.99 square miles (64.72 km^{2}) is land and 2.34 square miles (6.06 km^{2}) is water.

== Transport ==
While the Bangor area is served by two commercial bus carriers, it does not include service to Orrington. Freight rail service is provided by the Bangor & Aroostook Railroad Company and by the Maine Central Railroad Company (operated by the Springfield Terminal Railway (Vermont)). Rail connecting Bucksport to Brewer runs through Orrington along the shore of the Penobscot River with a spur line to the former HoltraChem site. There are intermodal rail facilities in Bangor and in Hermon, Maine both with ready access to Interstate 95 and to Bangor International Airport.

== Economy ==
Orrington was home to the HoltraChem plant, which occupied 235 acres alongside the Penobscot River. It produced chlorine and other chemicals for the Maine´s paper and pulp industry. In September 2000, HoltraChem closed its plant in Orrington, terminating 72 employees, at the time the town’s second largest employer, and the town’s largest taxable property. As of 2002, the Penobscot Energy Recovery Corporation (PERC) waste-to-energy incinerator remained the only industrial employer (82 people).

== Environmental contamination ==
The HoltraChem site itself was heavily contaminated, and cleanup was ordered by and as of 2022 is overseen by the Maine Department of Environmental Protection. Starting in 1967, HoltraChem had disposed of up to 13 tons of mercury into the river and mercury concentrations in lobsters and crabs have been so high that the Department of Marine Resources ordered a fishery closure.

In 2000, the Maine People’s Alliance and NRDC filed a lawsuit against Mallinckrodt US LLC, the successor to the plant’s first corporate owner. In March 2021, a settlement submitted to a federal district court started the process of a river cleanup plan, long-term monitoring, and funding for projects to benefit communities affected by the pollution.

== Demographics ==
Historical population
Census	Pop.	Note	%±
1790	477		—
1800	786		64.8%
1810	1,341		70.6%
1820	1,029		−23.3%
1830	1,234		19.9%
1840	1,580		28.0%
1850	1,852		17.2%
1860	1,950		5.3%
1870	1,768		−9.3%
1880	1,529		−13.5%
1890	1,406		−8.0%
1900	1,266		−10.0%
1910	1,219		−3.7%
1920	1,174		−3.7%
1930	1,167		−0.6%
1940	1,517		30.0%
1950	1,895		24.9%
1960	2,539		34.0%
1970	2,702		6.4%
1980	3,244		20.1%
1990	3,309		2.0%
2000	3,526		6.6%
2010	3,733		5.9%
2020	3,812		2.1%
U.S. Decennial Census

=== 2010 census ===
As of the census of 2010, there were 3,733 people, 1,478 households, and 1,068 families living in the town. The population density was 149.4 inhabitants per square mile (57.7/km^{2}). There were 1,612 housing units at an average density of 64.5 per square mile (24.9/km^{2}). The racial makeup of the town was 98.2% White, 0.2% African American, 0.4% Native American, 0.6% Asian, 0.2% from other races, and 0.5% from two or more races. Hispanic or Latino of any race were 0.9% of the population.

There were 1,478 households, of which 30.7% had children under the age of 18 living with them, 60.5% were married couples living together, 7.8% had a female householder with no husband present, 3.9% had a male householder with no wife present, and 27.7% were non-families. 20.3% of all households were made up of individuals, and 8.1% had someone living alone who was 65 years of age or older. The average household size was 2.53 and the average family size was 2.91.

The median age in the town was 43.5 years. 21.9% of residents were under the age of 18; 6.8% were between the ages of 18 and 24; 23.7% were from 25 to 44; 34.1% were from 45 to 64; and 13.5% were 65 years of age or older. The gender makeup of the town was 49.6% male and 50.4% female.

=== 2000 census ===
As of the census of 2000, there were 3,526 people, 1,396 households, and 1,042 families living in the town. The population density was 138.8 inhabitants per square mile (53.6/km^{2}). There were 1,489 housing units at an average density of 58.6 per square mile (22.6/km^{2}). The racial makeup of the town was 99.09% White, 0.20% African American, 0.11% Native American, 0.23% Asian, 0.03% from other races, and 0.34% from two or more races. Hispanic or Latino of any race were 0.14% of the population.

There were 1,396 households, out of which 32.7% had children under the age of 18 living with them, 64.3% were married couples living together, 7.1% had a female householder with no husband present, and 25.3% were non-families. 19.3% of all households were made up of individuals, and 8.7% had someone living alone who was 65 years of age or older. The average household size was 2.52 and the average family size was 2.89.

In the town, the population was spread out, with 23.6% under the age of 18, 5.8% from 18 to 24, 29.8% from 25 to 44, 28.8% from 45 to 64, and 12.1% who were 65 years of age or older. The median age was 40 years. For every 100 females, there were 99.9 males. For every 100 females age 18 and over, there were 96.7 males.

The median income for a household in the town was $44,327, and the median income for a family was $47,803. Males had a median income of $35,250 versus $27,381 for females. The per capita income for the town was $19,290. About 2.4% of families and 4.3% of the population were below the poverty line, including 3.6% of those under age 18 and 5.8% of those age 65 or over.

=== 1790 census ===
At the first US census, in 1790, Orrington had 477 inhabitants: 86 families, 114 free white males of 16 years and upward, including heads of families, 128 Free white males under 16 years, 234 free white females, including heads of families, and one other free person, no slaves.

== Education ==
Orrington is home to a Pre-Kindergarten through 8th grade school for its residents. Center Drive School, named after the road it is located on, has about 400 students. The mascot of Center Drive School is the Eagles.

== Notable people ==
- Ethel Baker, state legislator
- Richard H. Campbell, state legislator
- Ebenezer M. Chamberlain (1805–1861), US congressman from Indiana
- Molly Kool (1916–2009), first female master mariner in North America
- Benjamin Franklin Mudge (1817–1879), geologist, paleontologist
- Enoch Mudge (1776–1850), first American-born Methodist minister, state congressman
- Thomas H. Mudge, Methodist minister, professor of theology
- Zachariah A. Mudge, Methodist clergyman, author
- Edward A. Pierce, Wall St. banker, one of founders of Merrill, Lynch, Pierce, Fenner, and Smith, Inc., now Merrill Lynch
- J. Sumner Rogers, founder of Michigan Military Academy
