= Richard Zachariah Mudge =

Richard Zachariah Mudge (also Zachary) (1790–1854) was an English officer of the Royal Engineers, known as a surveyor.

== Early life ==
He was the eldest son of William Mudge, and great-grandson of Zachariah Mudge, born at Plymouth on 6 September 1790. He was educated at Blackheath and at the Royal Military Academy at Woolwich. He received a commission as second lieutenant Royal Engineers on 4 May 1807, and was promoted first lieutenant on 14 July the same year.

== Peninsular War ==
In March 1809 Mudge sailed for Lisbon, and joined the army under Sir Arthur Wellesley at Abrantes in May. He was present at the battle of Talavera, and on the enemy abandoning their position in front of Talavera he reconnoitred the River Alberche. He reached Escalona by the left bank, but taking the right bank to complete the reconnaissance, he was surprised by the enemy, who captured his attendant with his horse and baggage. He accompanied the army in the retreat from Talavera to Badajos, and was then employed in the construction of the lines of Lisbon. He returned to England on 20 June 1810 in poor health.

== Surveyor ==
Mudge was employed under his father on the Ordnance Survey, and was for some years in charge of the drawing department at the Tower of London. He was promoted second captain on 21 July 1813. In 1817 he was directed to assist Jean Baptiste Biot, who was sent to England as the commissioner of the Bureau des Longitudes of Paris to take pendulum observations, and he accompanied Biot to Leith Fort near Edinburgh, to Aberdeen, and to Unst in the Shetland islands. At Unst Mudge fell ill, and had to return to London.

In 1818 he was engaged in superintending the survey of Lincolnshire. In 1819 he went to Dunkirk for the survey, and in 1821 to the north coast of France. He was elected a Fellow of the Royal Society on 5 December 1822. He was promoted first captain on 23 March 1825, and regimental lieutenant-colonel on 10 January 1837, remaining permanently on the Ordnance Survey. On the death of his uncle, Richard Rosedew of Beechwood, Devon, in 1837, he succeeded to the property.

== The Maine–New Brunswick boundary ==
About 1830 the question of the boundary between Maine and New Brunswick assumed a high profile, leading to a confrontation, the so-called Aroostook War. The issue was referred to the arbitration of William I of the Netherlands, but the United States declined to abide by the compromise he proposed. The British government in 1838, to bring the matter to a settlement, appointed Mudge and George William Featherstonhaugh commissioners to examine the territory in dispute and report on the claims of the United States.

In spring 1839 the commissioners prepared and expedition, and reached New York in July. They then went to Fredericton in New Brunswick, and set off on 24 August on their main journey. The party reached Quebec on 21 October, and Mudge made a side trip to Niagara, before returning to New York, and England at the end of the year.

In 1840 the commissioners looked into the history of the boundary question, and reported that the line claimed by the United States was inconsistent with the physical geography of the country and the terms of the treaty; but that they had discovered a line of highlands south of that claimed, which was in accordance with the language of the treaty. The report was laid before parliament, and the result was a compromise based on the report and settled by the Webster–Ashburton Treaty of 1842. The issue was resolved by new governments on both sides of the Atlantic, despite reservations from Featherstonehaugh, who had a low opinion of Mudge, and the American view that the report, based on notional features, was partisan.

== Last years ==
Mudge retired from the army on full pay on 7 September 1850, and resided at Beechwood. He died at Teignmouth, Devon, on 24 September 1854, and was buried at Denbury.

== Works ==
Mudge wrote Observations on Railways, with reference to Utility, Profit, and the Obvious Necessity of a National System, London, 1837.

== Family ==
Mudge married, on 1 September 1817, Alice Watson, daughter of James Watson Hull of Great Baddow and County Down, Ireland, and left two daughters, Jane Rosedew, who married the Rev. William Charles Raffles Flint, and died in 1883, and Sophia Elizabeth, who married the Rev. John Richard Bogue, son of Richard Bogue.
