= Isaac Dalby =

English mathematician, surveyor and teacher (1744–1824)

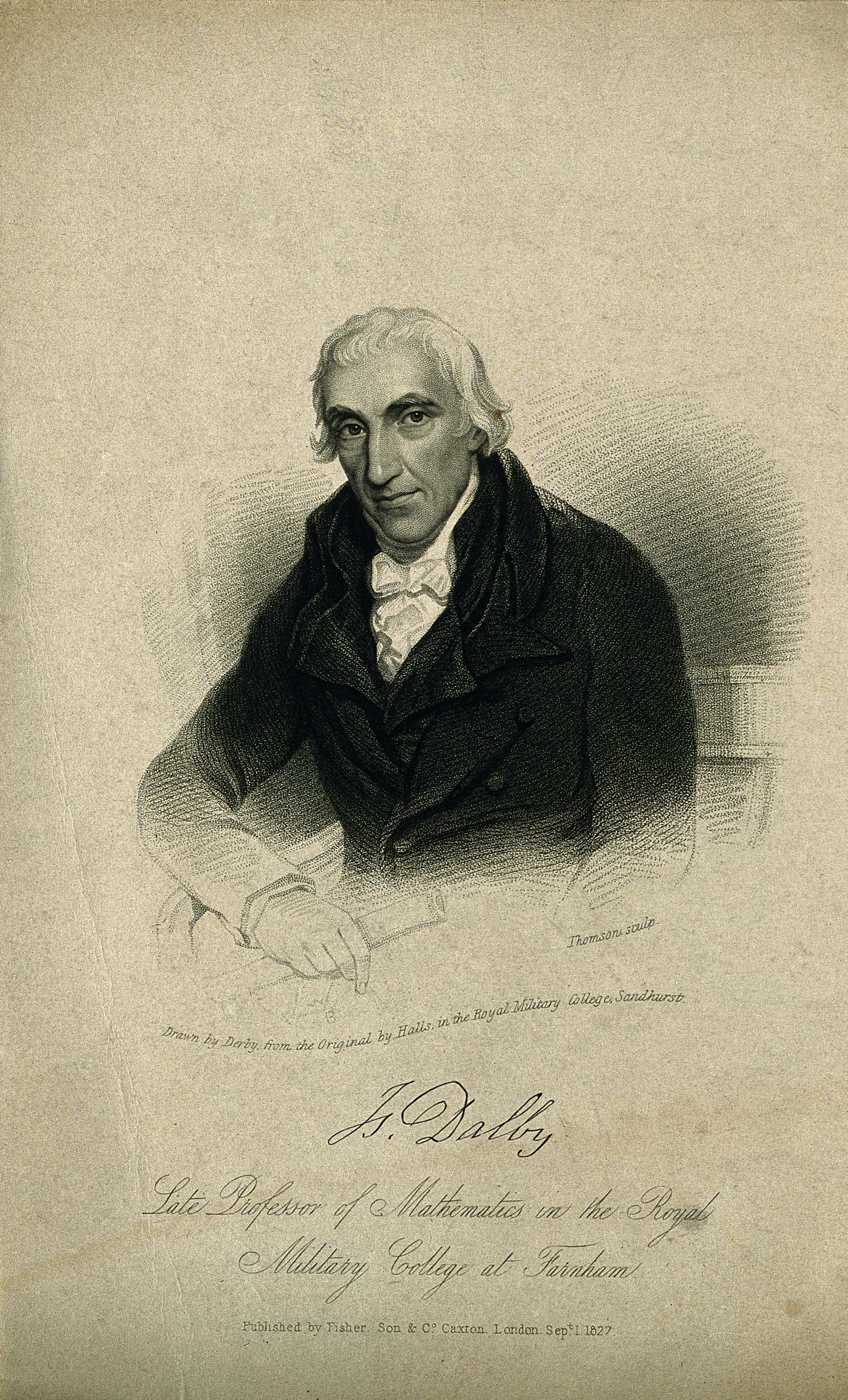
Engraving by James Thomson

Isaac Dalby (1744 – 16 October 1824) was an English mathematician, surveyor and teacher. He was involved in the Principal Triangulation of Great Britain, the first high-precision trigonometric survey of Great Britain.

== Life ==
Dalby was born in Gloucestershire in 1744. He attended a local school, and was expected to be a clothworker; but having taught himself mathematics, he secured the post of usher in a country school. After three years he opened his own school.

The venture failed, and in 1772 he arrived in London, and obtained an appointment as teacher of arithmetic in Archbishop Tenison's School in Lambeth. Afterwards he was employed by Topham Beauclerk in making astronomical observations, in a building which the latter had erected for the purpose; he was also librarian of Beauclerk's large library.

This arrangement was broken up by the death of Beauclerk in 1780; in the following year Dalby was appointed mathematics master in a naval school at Chelsea, which later failed. In 1787 he was recommended by Jesse Ramsden, the scientific instrument maker, to General William Roy, whom he assisted from 1787 to 1790 in the Anglo-French survey to connect the Greenwich meridian and the Paris meridian. He was engaged at a later period with Colonel Edward Williams and Captain William Mudge to work on the trigonometrical survey of England and Wales.

In 1799 he was appointed first professor of mathematics in the senior department of the Royal Military College, High Wycombe, which subsequently moved to Farnham in Surrey, and later became the Royal Military College, Sandhurst. He held this post for twenty-one years, resigning it in 1820, when old age and infirmity had overtaken him. He was a contributor to The Ladies' Diary, and was an original member of the Linnean Society of London.

Dalby died at Farnham on 16 October 1824, and was buried there at St Andrew's Church. His wife Lucy died in 1825.

== Publications ==
He published:

1. Account of the late Reuben Burrow's Measurement of a Degree of Longitude and another of Latitude in Bengal (London, 1796)
2. Account of the Operations for accomplishing a Trigonometrical Survey of England and Wales, from the commencement in 1784 to the end in 1796, in 3 volumes (London, 1799)
3. A Course of Mathematics designed for the use of the Officers and Cadets of the Royal Military College, in 2 volumes (London, 1805)
4. The Longitude of Dunkirk and Paris from Greenwich, deduced from the Triangular Measurement in 1787–1788, supposing the Earth to be an Ellipsis (Philosophical Transactions of the Royal Society. abr. xvii. 67, 1791)
