= Fenis and St. Joseph =

Fenis and St. Joseph, also known as the São João e Fénix, São Jao y Fenix or the San José el Fénix, was a 50 foot brig that visited Nootka Sound in 1792. She was also described as "an open shallop, with only 14 men". She bore a Portuguese flag of convenience, possibly out of Macau and had a Portuguese captain, João de Barros Andrade, but had the Englishman Robert Duffin on board as supercargo (owner and manager of the ship's cargo and trade). Duffin was an associate of John Meares who had organized a number of British fur trading expeditions using the Portuguese flag in order to evade paying for trading licenses from the East India Company. It is probable that Duffin was actually in command of the vessel.

The Fenis and St. Joseph spent part of the summer of 1792 in the Queen Charlotte Islands, trading with the indigenous people for sea otter pelts. On 12 August 1792 Adventure, under Robert Haswell, encountered Fenis and St. Joseph near Masset.

In mid-September, having gathered about 700 sea otter pelts, Fenis and St. Joseph arrived at Nootka Sound. At the time, diplomatic discussions taking place between George Vancouver and Juan Francisco de la Bodega y Quadra over how to carry out the First Nootka Convention resulting from the Nootka Crisis of 1789. Since Duffin had been at Nootka Sound with Meares in 1788 and with James Colnett in 1789—both key moments of the Nootka Crisis—Vancouver quickly asked him for a sworn statement about the events of 1789 at Nootka Sound. Duffin's report contradicted the reports of Robert Gray and Joseph Ingraham, which Bodega y Quadra had been using to undermine Vancouver's diplomatic position. Where Gray and Ingraham swore that Meares had never purchased any land from the local indigenous chief Maquinna, Duffin said Meares had in fact purchased the whole of Friendly Cove. The point was central to whether Bodega y Quadra would or would not turn over the Spanish settlement at Nootka Sound to Vancouver. Vancouver seems to have had doubts about the veracity of Duffin's account, but confronted Bodega with the new information. Bodega dismissed it, claiming that Duffin could not be objective on the matter. In response to Vancouver's use of Duffin's sworn statements Bodega sought a formal statement from Maquinna, from whom Meares had supposedly made the land purchase. Maquinna came before a group assembled at Bodega's house, including Barros Andrade, the captain of the San José el Fénix (Fenis and St. Joseph), and a number of others, all of whom were to serve as witnesses for an affidavit. Before this group Maquinna flatly denied selling Meares any land. He had only sold a bit of land in Marvinas Bay to the American John Kendrick and he had donated the land at Friendly Cove to Francisco de Eliza, where the Spanish settlement then stood, on the condition that the land be returned when the Spanish withdrew. Between the statements of Duffin and Maquinna the negotiations between Vancouver and Bodega reached a complete deadlock.

The Fenis and St. Joseph played an important part in the Vancouver Expedition. The brig left Nootka Sound on 1 October 1792, sailing for China and carrying Vancouver's lieutenant Zachary Mudge, with copies of journals, charts, and logs, as well as reports from Vancouver to the British government regarding the diplomatic impasse that had developed.

On 28 October 1792 the brig encountered the Columbia Rediviva at sea. The two vessels and their commanders met again in the Hawaiian Islands, where Captain Haswell personally met Mudge.

After meeting Haswell the ship made for Macao, where Mudge disembarked. From Macao, the Fenis and St. Joseph made her way to Madras under a new master, Moore, arriving in April 1793. Mudge took passage from Canton on the East Indiaman Lord Macartney in January 1793, arriving in England in June . The Fenis and St. Josephdid not return to the Pacific coast.
