= James Mills Thoburn =

American Methodist bishop (1836–1922)

Methodist James Mills Thoburn
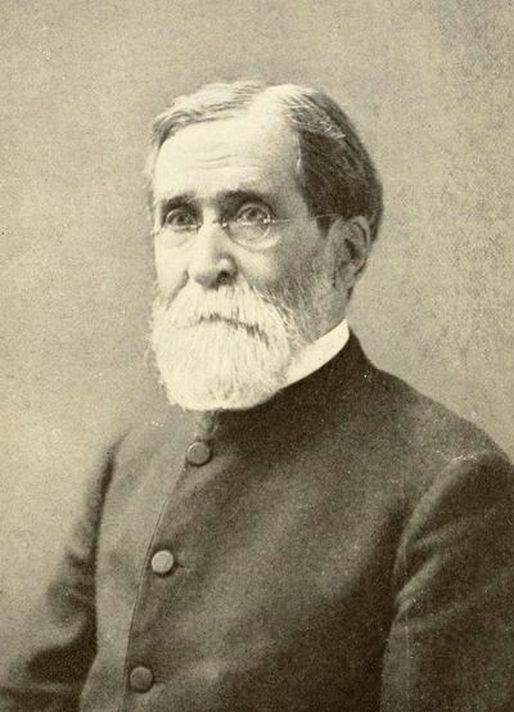
- Methodist Bishop of India

Personal details
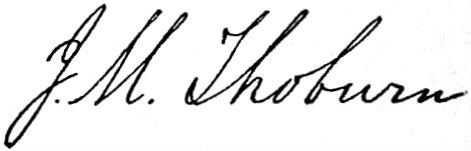
- Signature

James Mills Thoburn (March 7, 1836 – November 28, 1922) was an American bishop and missionary of the Methodist Episcopal Church as well as an author. He did missionary work in India and greatly increased the number of Christian practitioners in that country.

== Early life ==
Thoburn was born on March 7, 1836, in St. Clairsville, Ohio, and graduated from Allegheny College in Meadville, Pennsylvania, in 1857, beginning his Methodist preaching ministry that same year in the Pittsburgh Conference. He was ordained an Elder in 1858.

== Missionary career ==
Thoburn went to India as a missionary in 1859 and was stationed successively at Nynee Tal, Moradabad, Lucknow, and Calcutta, where he founded Calcutta Boys' School in 1877. Preaching in both the native and European languages, he built the largest church in India at that time. As presiding Elder of the Indian Conference, he preached for some time at Simla, the summer capital of India, and was for five years editor of the Indian Witness and came to its aid when it was in financial and managerial difficulties.

On the insistence of Reverend William Taylor, Thoburn left Lucknow in 1874 to serve as a missionary, without salary, from the Missionary Society, in Calcutta, and was associated with that missionary enterprise in 1888. On a busy street in Calcutta Thoburn built, and later rebuilt, a church, which was twice filled to capacity every Sunday. Thoburn established The Burma Mission in 1879

After an accident, he returned to the United States in 1886. Some two years later, at the 1888 Methodist Episcopal General Conference held in New York City, Thoburn was elected as India and Malaysia's first missionary bishop. he was committed in an effort to “put India on America’s heart.” The consecration services were held on Tuesday, May 29. While Bishop, Thoburn greatly increased the number of followers from a small number to approximately a quarter of a million bishop of India and Malaysia.

He published the book entitled My Missionary Apprenticeship, in 1884, a history of twenty-five years in India, and a collection entitled Missionary Sermons in 1888. Other works included The Deaconess and her Vocation (1893), Christless Nations (1894), The Church of Pentecost (1899), Life of Isabella Thoburn (1903), The Christian Conquest of India (1906), India and Southern Asia (1907), and God's Heroes Our Examples (1914). Thoburn retired in 1908 to Meadville. He died on November 28, 1922, aged 86.

Thoburn was the uncle of YWCA leader Mabel Cratty.

== Works ==
- Thoburn, James Mills (1884). My missionary apprenticeship. New York: Phillips & Hunt.
- —— (1888). Missionary addresses. New York: Phillips and Hunt.
- —— (1893). India and Malaysia. Cincinnati: Cranston.
- —— (1894). Light in the East. Chicago: Curts & Jennings.
- —— (1895). The Christian Nations. New York: Hunt & Eaton.
- —— (1901). The Church of Pentecost. Cincinnati: Jennings & Pye.
- —— (1903). Life of Isabella Thoburn. Cincinnati: Jennings and Pye.
- —— (1906). The Christian conquest of India. New York: Young People's Missionary Movement.

== See also ==
- List of bishops of the United Methodist Church
- James Mudge - Fellow missionary of Thoburn, in India
- William Fitzjames Oldham - biographer and missionary bishop for South Asia

== Bibliography ==
- Buck, Oscar MacMillan (1936). Malone, Dumas (ed.). Dictionary of American biography: Thoburn. Vol. XVIII. New York: Charles Scribner's Sons. pp. 418–420.
- Curts, Lewis E. (1900). General Conferences of the Methodist Episcopal Church, from 1792 to 1896. Cincinnati: Curts & Jennings; New York : Eaton & Mains.
- Oldham, William Fitzjames (1918). Thoburn - Called of God. New York & Cincinnati: The Methodist Book Concern.
- Versteg, John M.; Green, John D., eds. (1962). Methodism, Ohio area (1812-1962). Ohio: Ohio Area Sequicentennial Committee.
- The World's work. Vol. XVIII. Garden City, N.Y.: Doubleday, Page. 1922.
