= Mabel Cratty =

American educator

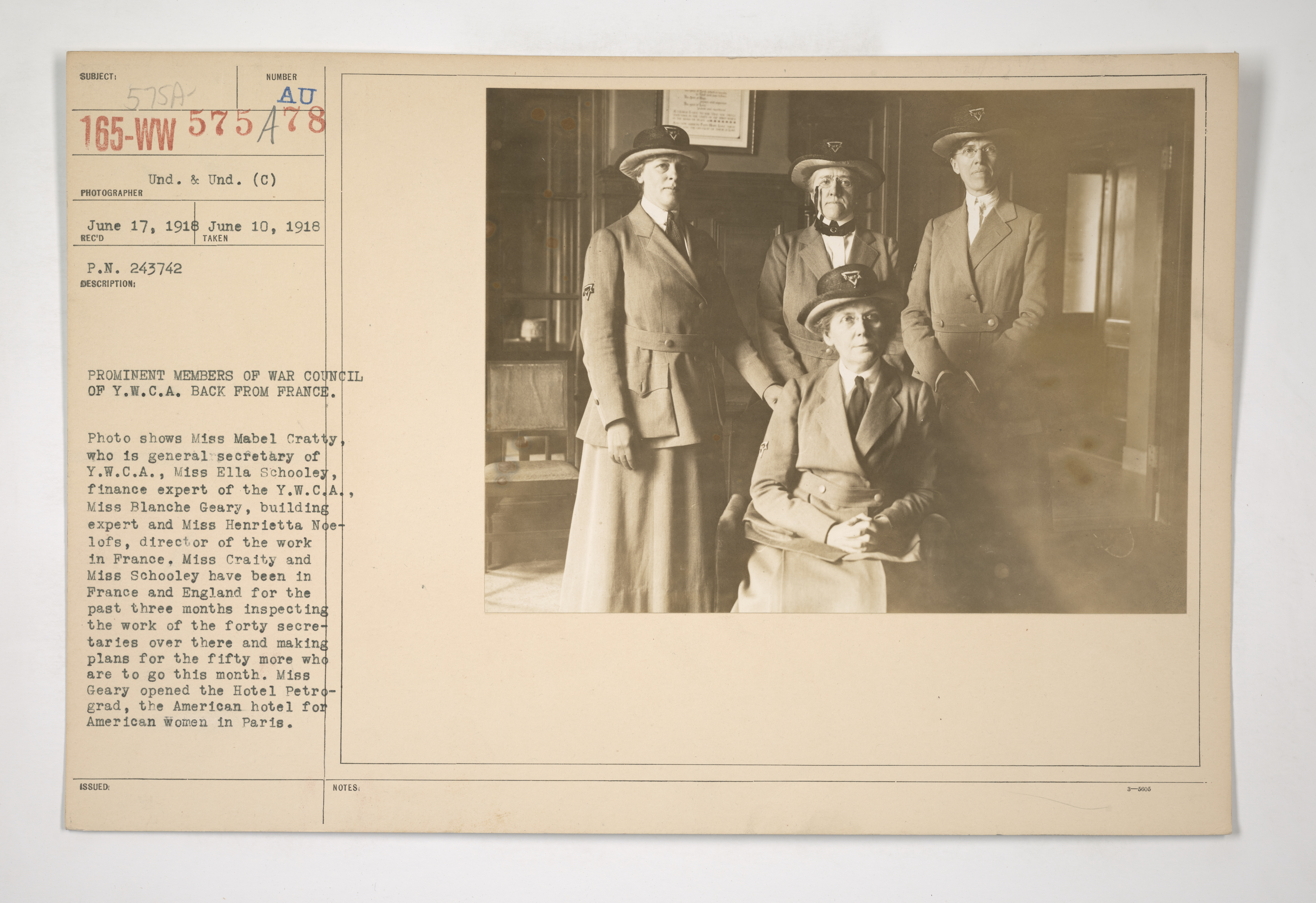
Mabel Cratty and other YWCA personnel

Mabel Cratty (June 30, 1868 - February 27, 1928) was an American educator and served as the General Secretary of the National Board of the YWCA from 1906 until her death in 1928.

== Early life and education ==
Cratty was born to Harold and Mary Cratty in Bellaire, Ohio. Harold was a merchant and later an insurance agent. Cratty had one brother, Donald, and one sister, Anna. Her uncle was the Methodist bishop James Mills Thoburn.

Cratty attended public schools in Bellaire, with one year at the Lake Erie Seminary, receiving her teacher's education at Ohio Wesleyan University (OWU). She received an honorary Doctor of Laws degree from OWU in 1922.

== Career ==
After graduating from OWU in 1890, Mabel became a public school teacher in Ohio and Delaware, as well as at the Wheeling (West Virginia) Seminary. From 1900 to 1904, she was the principal of a high school in Delaware, Ohio.

Cratty's involvement with the YWCA, an organization she came to call "the home of her spirit," came through college friends who convinced her to join the Ohio State Committee of the American Committee of Young Women's Christian Associations in 1902. In 1904 she resigned from the Delaware High School and moved to Chicago to become Associate General Secretary of the American Committee.

When the American Committee merged with the International Board of Women's and Young Women's Christian Associations to form the YWCA of the U.S.A. in 1906, Cratty moved to New York City to take charge of the new organization's Home Department. After a year or so working out administrative structure, by-laws, motto, seal, and articles of incorporation, the YWCA of the U.S.A. appointed Cratty General Secretary, the chief executive staff member. She held this position until her death from pneumonia in 1928.

Cratty credited her Scots-Irish Thoburn relatives with a singular determination to "transcend a narrow point of view." As an administrator, she quietly worked to shape the YWCA into an organization with "prophetic vision and courage." A New York Times editorial following her death in 1928 called her a "seer among her sisters" citing her "exceptional foresight in anticipating the direction which social and economic development of womanhood would take" in the first two and a half decades of the twentieth century.

In addition to this and other work with the YWCA, Mabel Cratty was involved with a variety of other organizations, including World Student Christian Federation (WSCF), and the National Committee on the Cause and Cure of War (CCCW).

== Death ==
Mabel Cratty died of pneumonia on February 27, 1928, in New York City. She was buried in the family plot in Bellaire, Ohio.

== Legacy ==
The Women's Building on the campus of George Williams College (GWC), built in 1926, was renamed Mabel Cratty Hall in her honor in 1930. Her papers from 1904 to 1928 are a part of the Sophia Smith Collection of Smith College. At the time of her death, she lived in New York City.
