= Richard Bogue =

British Army officer (1782–1813)

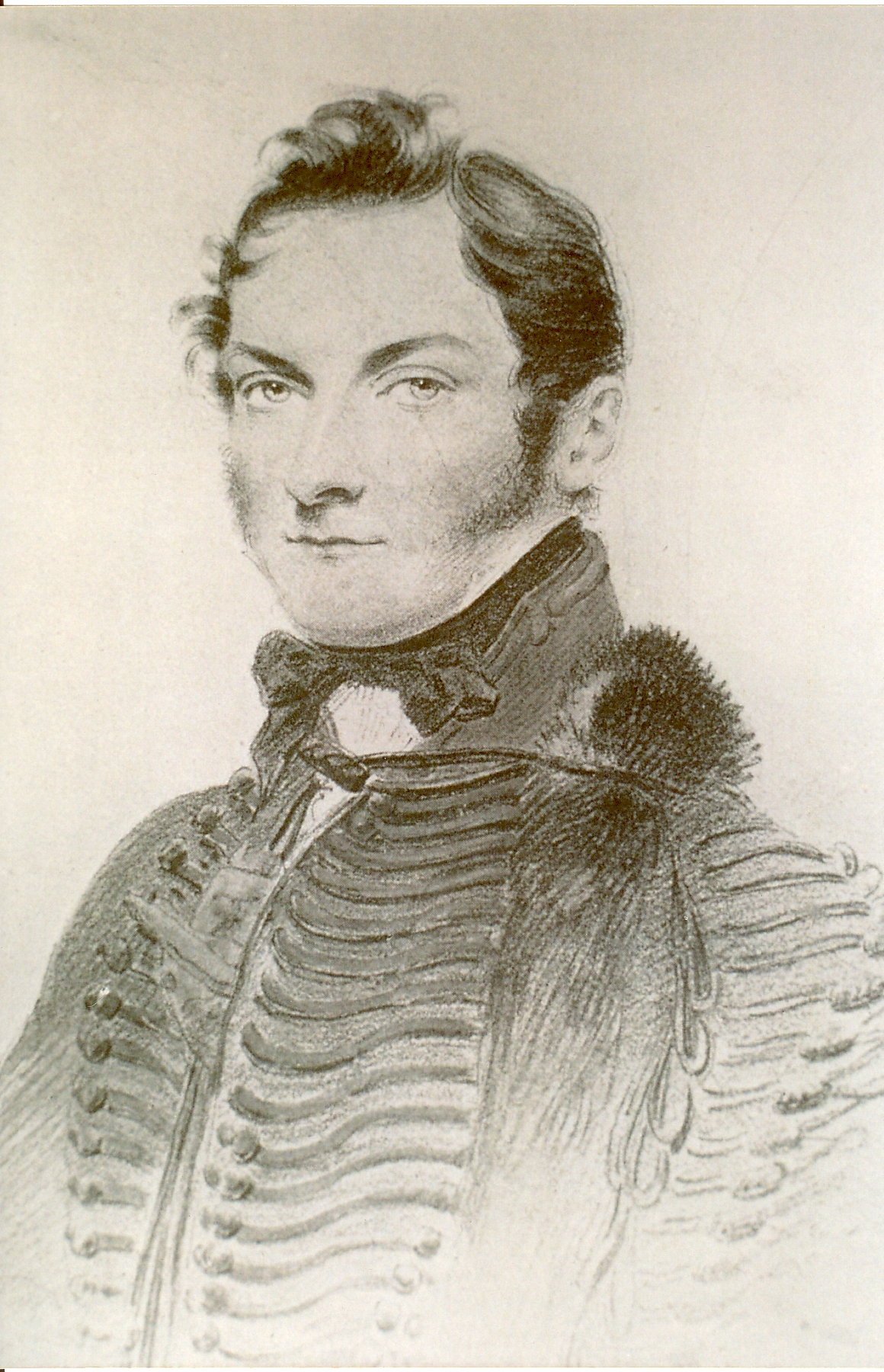
- Born: 24 October 1782; Titchfield, Hampshire, Great Britain
- Died: 18 October 1813 (aged 30); Near Sellerhausen, Saxony
- Burial place: Taucha, Saxony
- Military career
- Allegiance: Great Britain; United Kingdom
- Branch: British Army
- Service years: 1798–1813
- Rank: Captain
- Unit: Royal Horse Artillery
- Commands: The Rocket Brigade
- Conflicts: Napoleonic Wars; Peninsular War; Battle of Sahagún; Battle of Benavente; Battle of Corunna; War of the Sixth Coalition; Battle of the Göhrde; Battle of Leipzig †
- Awards: Order of the Sword

Captain Richard Bogue (24 October 1782 – 18 October 1813) was a British Army officer who commanded a company of the Rocket Brigade at the Battle of Leipzig, where he was killed in action.

== Biography ==
Bogue was the youngest son of John Bogue, a Royal Navy surgeon, of Fareham, Hampshire, and was born at Titchfield, Hampshire on 24 October 1782. The Scottish preacher David Bogue was his great-uncle. He entered the Royal Military Academy, Woolwich as a cadet on 31 January 1797, passing out as a second lieutenant of the Royal Artillery on 14 July 1798. He was then promoted to the rank of Lieutenant on 10 February 1800 and became a second captain on 18 March 1806. He was appointed to 'A' Troop Royal Horse Artillery in 1803, and transferred to 'B' Troop in 1804. 'B' Troop was sent to Spain in 1808, reaching Corunna on 9 November. This was the period of General Sir John Moore’s advance into Spain to confront Napoleon. 'B' Troop were present at the successful cavalry actions at Sahagún and Benavente, besides taking part in the Battle of Corunna.

Following the disappointing experimental field trials of Congreve rockets in 1807 and 1810, the first commitment by the Royal Artillery (Note: At this period the Royal Artillery consisted of ‘Horse Artillery’, ‘Foot Artillery’ and ‘Garrison Artillery’. The Horse Artillery were considered to be the elite units.) to the use of rockets was in September 1811. The Board of Ordnance placed a detachment of thirty-two men of the Royal Horse Artillery, under Second Captain Richard Bogue, at Congreve's disposal for further integrating rockets into the artillery. This detachment experimented with the weapon both at Woolwich and at Bagshot, helping Congreve refine his system for eventual use by horse artillery. On 7 June 1813 came orders designating Bogue's unit the "Rocket Brigade" (Note: At this time they did not use the term ‘battery’; rather, the unit of Foot Artillery was formed by bringing together a section of 5 guns and a howitzer, along with their ammunition wagons, plus a company of artillerymen, as well as a detachment of artillery drivers, into a ‘brigade’. A similar unit of Horse Artillery would be termed a ‘troop’.) and recommending that it be brought up to full strength and tried in actual service. (Note: This unit would only become 2nd Rocket Troop, Royal Horse Artillery on 1 January 1814, per MS No 376, General Orders) The Rocket Brigade landed at Wismar, in northern Germany, on 8 August and Bogue marched to join the Army of the North commanded by Crown Prince John of Sweden.

How the Rocket Brigade was brought into action on the third day of the Battle of Leipzig on 18 October 1813 is described in a letter which Lieutenant John Jones, aide-de-camp to Sir Charles Stewart, wrote to Captain Bogue’s father-in-law John Hanson.

At the commencement of the action on the morning of the 18th, Captain Bogue addressed himself to General Wintzingerode, commanding the advance of the Crown Prince, expressing his desire to see the enemy, and requesting permission to engage. The General, much struck with the gallantry and spirit of the address, granted as a guard a squadron of dragoons, and requested Captain Bogue to follow his own plans and judgement.

Captain Bogue lost no time in advancing to the attack of the village of Paunsdorf, then in possession of five of the enemy’s battalions, upon whom he opened, in advance of the whole army a most destructive fire. This was returned by musketry, and for some time a very hot combat ensured, when the enemy, unable to withstand the well directed fire of Captain Bogue’s brigade, fell into confusion and began to retreat. Captain Bogue, seizing the moment, charged at the head of the squadron of cavalry, and enemy, terrified at his approach, turned round, and taking off their caps, gave three huzzas, and every man, to the number of between two and three thousand, surrendered to the Rocket Brigade, which, I believe, did not exceed 200 men.

The intelligence of this success being communicated to the Crown Prince, he sent his thanks to Captain Bogue for such eminent services, requesting at the same time that he would continue his exertions; and the brigade proceeded in consequence to the attack of (I believe) the village of Sommerfeld [should be Sellerhausen] still further in advance. Sir C. Stewart accompanied the brigade and I was of the party. The situation taken up on the flank of the village was exposed to a most heavy fire, both of cannon-balls and grapeshot from the enemy’s line, and from the riflemen [musket-armed skirmishers] (Note: The French did not have light troops armed with rifles) in the village. A ball from the latter soon deprived us of the exertions of poor Bogue; it entered below the eye and passing through the head caused instantaneous death.

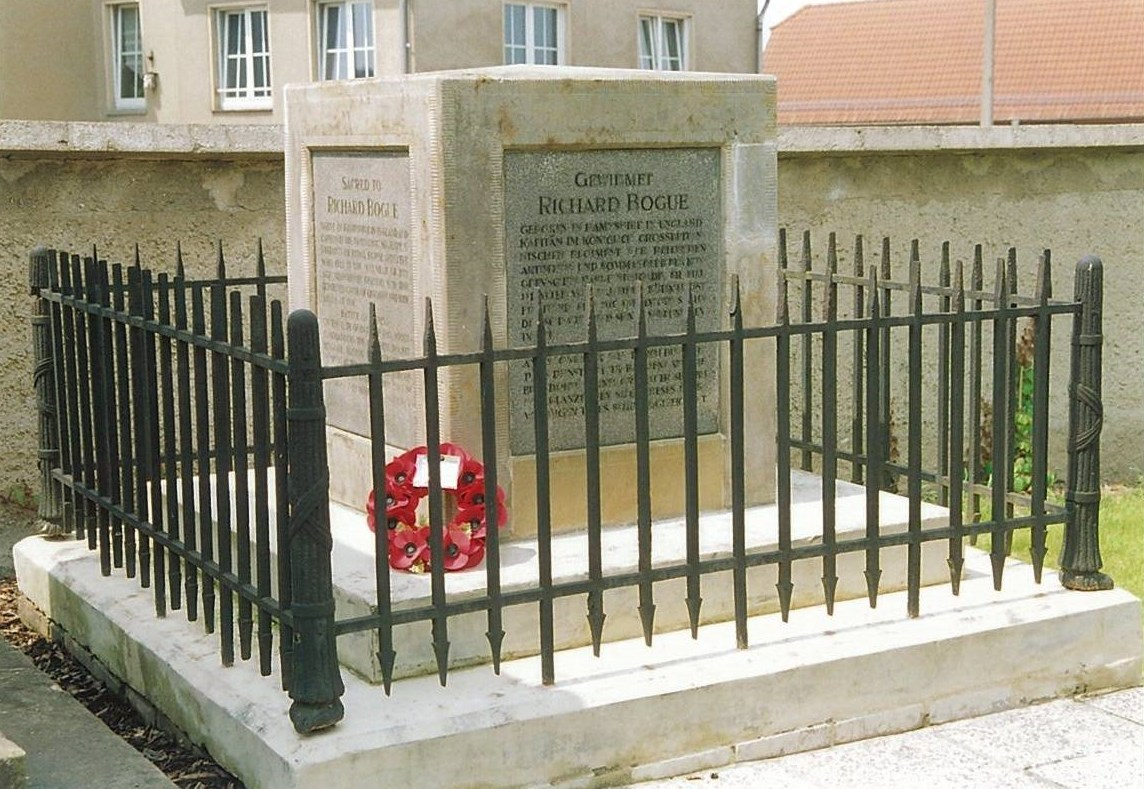
Bogue's tomb in Taucha churchyard

Richard Bogue was buried in Taucha churchyard, four miles away from where he fell, and a stone monument was erected over his grave in 1815 by national subscription. This monument was restored in 1896, and again in 1930. In Tichfield church a commemorative plaque in his memory was placed in the choir, near the altar. In later years, the village of Taucha named a street in his memory. In January 1814, the Crown Prince of Sweden made Bogue posthumously a knight of the Swedish Royal Order of the Sword, and sent the cross to Captain Bogue's widow together with a gift of 10,000 dollars.

== Family ==
Bogue married Mary Isabella Hanson. Their son, Rev. John Robert Bogue, married Sophia Elizabeth, daughter of Richard Zachariah Mudge.
