= James Mudge =

American missionary

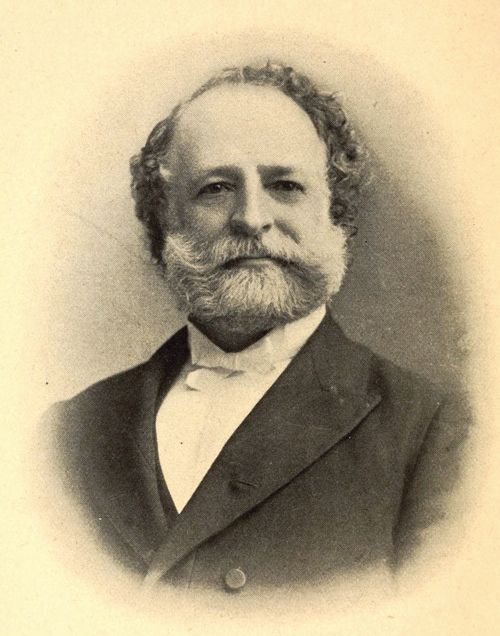
- Reverend, James Mudge

Personal life
- Born: April 5, 1844. West Springfield, Massachusetts
- Died: May 7, 1918 (aged 74)
- Parent(s): Rev. James and Harriet Wilde (Goodridge) Mudge
- Occupation: Missionary Reverend; Author, Editor
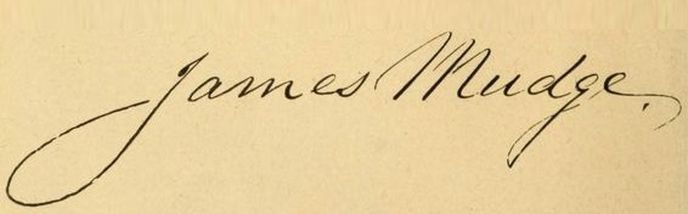
- Signature

Religious life
- Religion: Methodist Episcopal Church

James Mudge (1844–1918) was an American Methodist Episcopal clergyman and writer, nephew of Zachariah Mudge, Methodist missionary in India during the latter half of the 19th and early 20th centuries. He authored many works centered around religion and spirituality during his missionary career.

== Family and early life ==
Mudge was born at West Springfield, Mass., and during his infancy was baptized. At the age of twelve, Mudge became a firm believer in Christianity. On his thirteenth birthday, April 5, 1857, he joined the old Common Street Church in Lynn, Massachusetts where he prepared for college.

Mudge enrolled in and subsequently graduated from Wesleyan University in 1865 and from Boston University School of Theology in 1868. He was the son of the Reverend. James and Harriet Wilde (Goodridge) Mudge, and a descendant of Thomas Mudge, who was a resident of Maiden, Mass, as early as 1657. Enoch Mudge was his great-uncle, and Zachariah A. Mudge his cousin. He attended the public schools in South Harwich and Lynn. At age seventeen Mudge enrolled in Wesleyan University, in Middletown, Connecticut., and graduated in 1865 with a Bachelor of Arts. He spent the next two teaching Greek and Latin in the seminary at Pennington, NJ., and then entered the newly opened Boston University School of Theology, where earned a Bachelor of Sacred Theology in 1870.

== Missionary service ==
Immediately after graduating, Mudge entered the ministry, joining the New England conference. While a missionary in India from 1873 to 1883 he edited the Lucknow Witness. After his return he was pastor of churches in Massachusetts until 1908, serving also as lecturer on missions at the Boston University School of Theology. In 1889 he became secretary of the New England conference. From 1908 to 1912 he was book editor of Zion's Herald. Mudge aspired to missionary service in India after receiving a specific request from James Mills Thoburn, of Lucknow, India who exclaimed that they needed a "first class, scholarly young man of literary turn" to perform missionary work and act as editor of books and periodicals.

Mudge, along with his father James, were members of the New England Conference, of the Methodist Episcopal Church. Mudge was sent out by the Missionary Society of the Methodist Episcopal Church to become the editor of a weekly newspaper, The Lucknow Witness, a non-denominational but Christian publication. He had assumed its editorship after Reverends J.H. Messmore and James Mills Thoburn. The editorship was then passed back to Thoburn, who renamed it The India Witness.

In 1896, a book written by Mudge, Growth in Holiness Toward Perfection, published in 1895, received criticism from Daniel Steele, who alleged, " But many loyal Methodists are convinced that he [Mudge] is in great error, overturning our doctrinal foundations."

Mudge died in Maden, Massachusetts on May 7, 1918, and was buried next to his father in Pine Grove Cemetery in Lynn, Massachusetts.

His papers are held at Boston University.

== Works ==
- Mudge, James (1877). Memorial of Rev. Z. A. Mudge: Historical Sketch of the Missions Of the Methodist Episcopal Church.
- —— (1891). The Pastor's Missionary Manual.
- —— (1895). Growth in holiness toward perfection, or progressive sanctification.
- —— (1898). The Best of Browning.
- —— (1899). Honey From Many Hives.
- —— (1902). The Life of Love.
- —— (1903). The Land of Faith.
- —— (1905). The Saintly Calling.
- —— (1906). The Life Ecstatic.
- —— (1906). Fénelon the Mystic.
- —— (1907). Poems with power to Strengthen the Soul.
- —— (1909). The Riches of His Grace.
- —— (1910). History of the New England Conference, Methodist Episcopal Church, 1796-1910.
- —— (1911). The Perfect Life in Experience and Doctrine.
- —— (1912). Hymns of Trust.
- —— (1913). Religious Experience Exemplified in the Lives of Illustrious Christians.

== See also ==
- James Mills Thoburn - Associate missionary of Reverend Mudge, in India
- William Taylor (bishop) - Missionary in India, later Bishop in Africa

== Sources ==
- Archer, John Clark Archer (1934). Malone, Dumas (ed.). Dictionary of American biography. Vol. XIII. New York: Charles Scribner's Sons. pp. 305–306.
- Creegan, Charles Cole (1895). Great missionaries of the church. Nashville: Pub. House of the Methodist Episcopal Church, South.
- Mudge, James (1888). Garrison, Stephen Olin (ed.). Forty witnesses, covering the whole range of Christian experience. New York: Phillips & Hunt.
- Steele, Daniel (1896). A Defense of Christian Perfection.
- Taylor, William (1895). Ridpath, John (ed.). Story of my life. Toronto: W. Briggs.
