= Ordnance Survey Drawings =

1780s-1840 maps of England and Wales

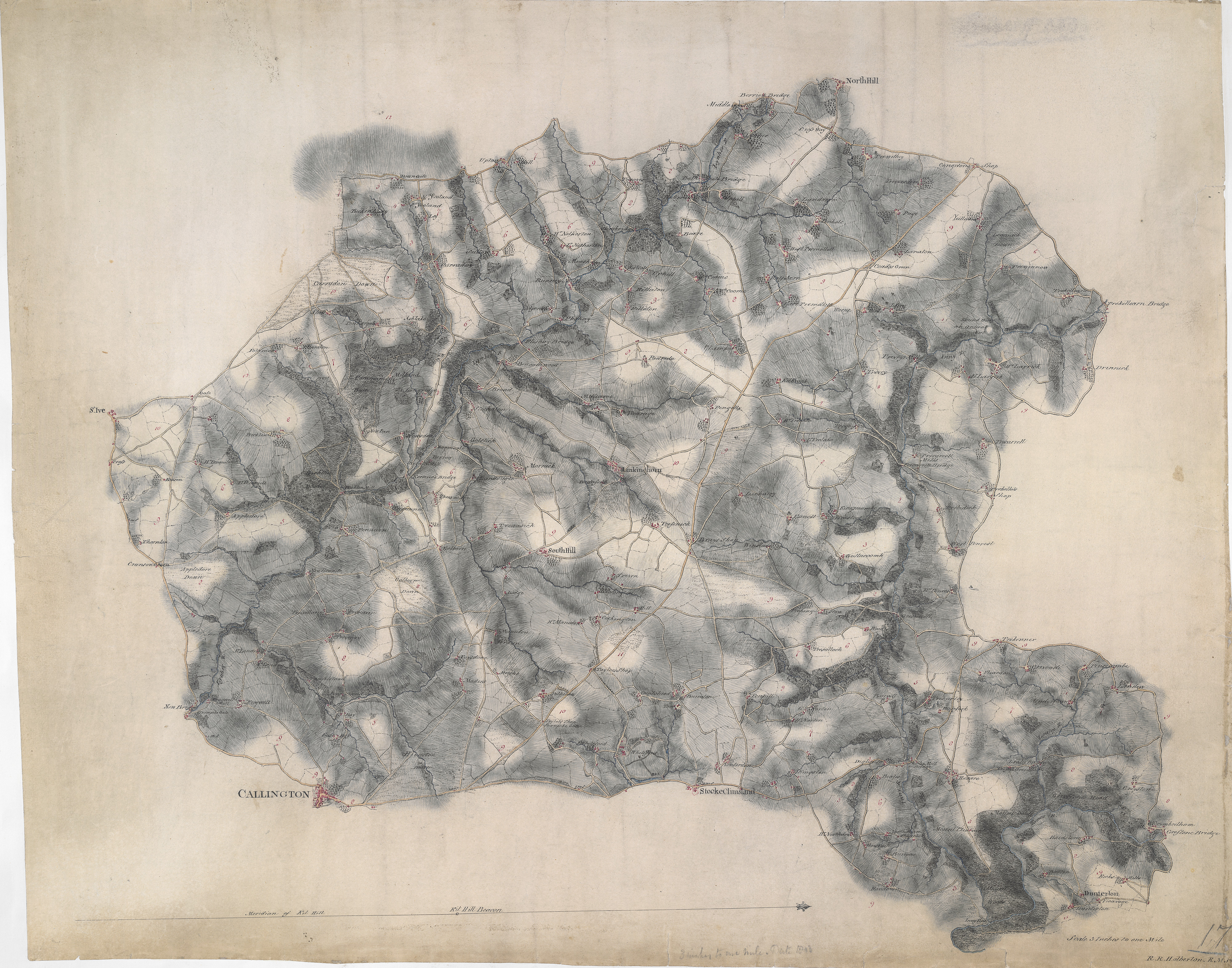
Callington (OSD 17)

The Ordnance Survey Drawings are a series of 351 of the original preliminary drawings made by the surveyors of the Ordnance Survey between the 1780s and 1840 in preparation for the publication of the one-inch-to-the-mile "Old Series" of maps of England and Wales. The drawings are now held in the British Library, and cover most of England south of a line between Liverpool and Kingston upon Hull, as well as parts of Wales.

The drawings provide a unique record of landscapes and land use in the eighteenth and early nineteenth centuries, of the expanding canal and turnpike road networks, and of place-names. They are now of interest to a range of researchers, including landscape historians, social historians, transport historians, students of place-names, and genealogists.

They can be seen on the Online Gallery at the British Library website.
