= John Mudge =

British physician

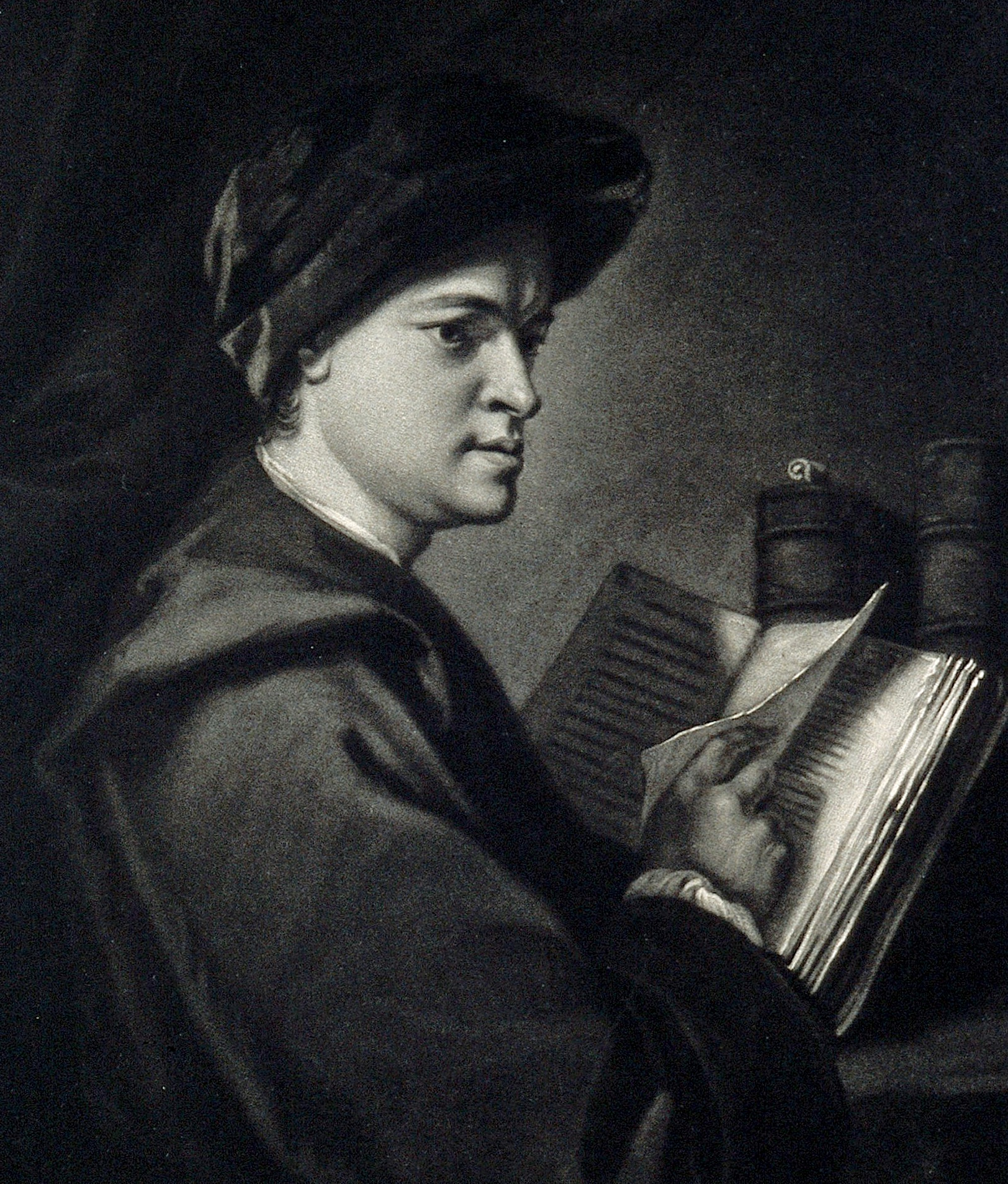
- Born: 1721
- Died: 26 March 1793 (aged 71–72)
- Citizenship: British
- Education: King's College, University of Aberdeen (M.D.) (1784)
- Known for: reflecting telescopes
- Awards: Copley Medal (1777)
- Scientific career
- Fields: physician

John Mudge (1721 – 26 March 1793) was a British physician and amateur creator of telescope mirrors. He won the Copley Medal in 1777 for a paper on reflecting telescopes.

== Life ==
He was the fourth and youngest son of the Rev. Zachariah Mudge, by his first wife, Mary Fox, and was born at Bideford, Devon. He was educated at Bideford and Plympton grammar schools, and studied medicine at Plymouth Hospital.

Several invitations were made to Mudge to try his fortunes in London. But he preferred to remain at Plymouth, where he practised for the remainder of his life, first as surgeon, and, after 1784, when he received the degree of M.D. from King's College, Aberdeen, as a physician.

Mudge inherited a friendship with the family of Sir Joshua Reynolds, and when in 1762 Samuel Johnson accompanied Reynolds on his visit to Plymouth, Johnson became a friend and consulted Mudge as a physician. Another intimate friend was John Smeaton. Other allies and guests of Mudge were James Ferguson, the astronomer, and James Northcote, originally a chemist's assistant, who owed him his position in Reynolds's studio.

== Telescopes ==
On 29 May 1777 Mudge was elected a Fellow of the Royal Society, and in the same year was awarded the Copley medal for his 'Directions for making the best Composition for the Metals for reflecting Telescopes; together with a Description of the Process for Grinding, Polishing, and giving the great Speculum the true Parabolic Curve,’ which were communicated by the author to the society, and printed in the Philosophical Transactions (1777, lxvii. 296). The 'Directions' were also issued separately by Bowyer (London, 1778). Sir John Pringle, the president, in making the presentation, remarked that Isaac Newton had predicted the role of mechanical devices in making parabolic mirrors.

The manufacture of telescopes continued to occupy much of his spare time. He made two large ones with a magnifying power of two hundred times; one of these he gave to Hans Moritz von Brühl, and it passed to the Gotha Observatory, the other descended to his son William Mudge.

== Medical works ==
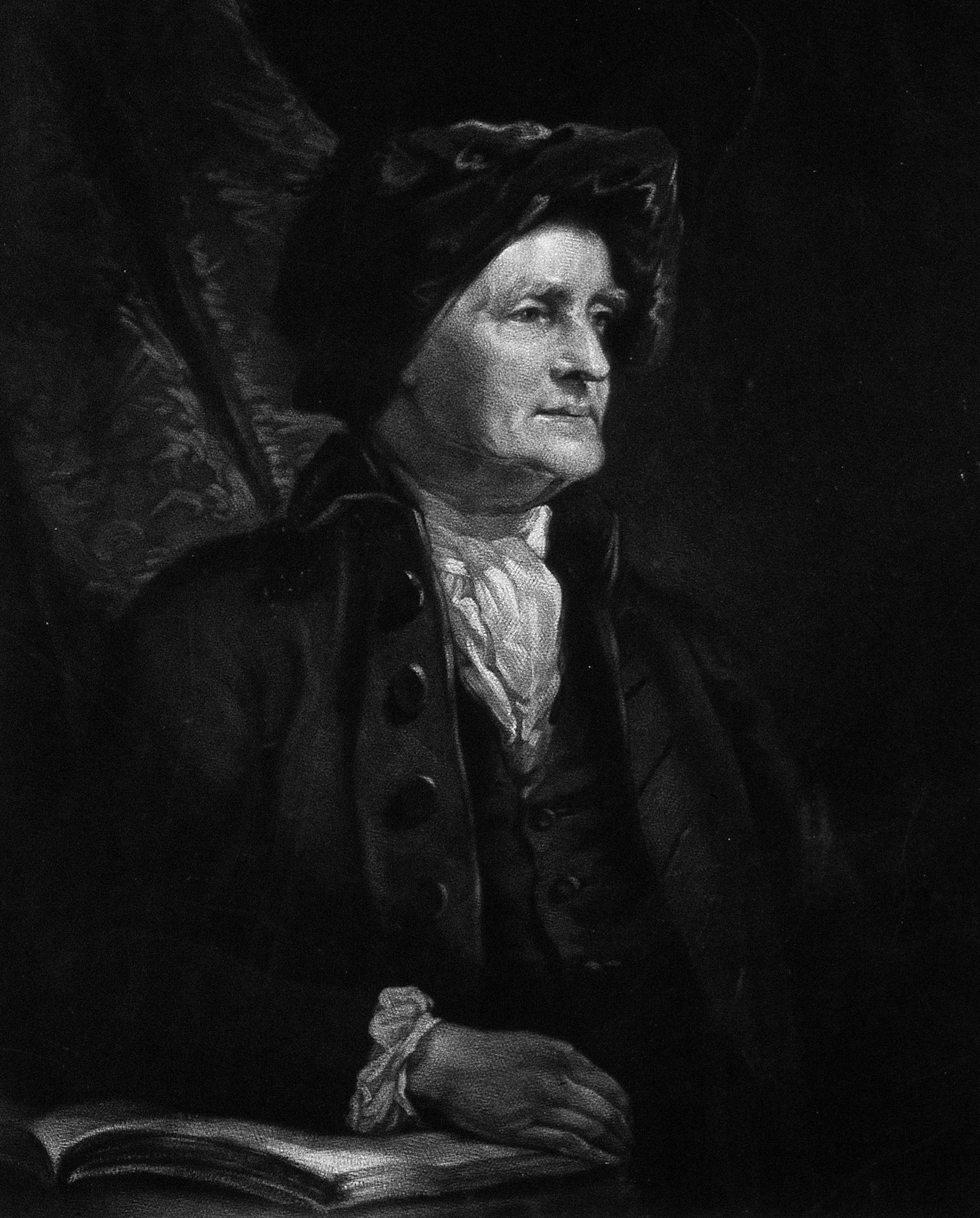
John Mudge in the 1790s

In 1777 he published a work on smallpox representing an advance on the previous treatises by Richard Mead and others.

In 1778 he published 'A Radical and Expeditious Cure for recent Catarrhous Cough,’ with a drawing of a remedial inhaler, which obtained wide acceptance. He wrote some further small medical treatises.

== Family ==
Mudge was married three times, and had ten children. By Mary Bulteel, his first wife, he had eight children. His second wife, Jane, was buried on 3 February 1766 in St. Andrew's. He married thirdly, 29 May 1767, Elizabeth Garrett, who survived him, dying in 1808, aged 72. His sons included William Mudge and Zachary Mudge, by his second and third wives respectively.
