= Richard Mudge =

English clergyman and composer

Richard Mudge (born 1718 in Bideford; died April 1763 in Bedworth) was an English clergyman and composer of the late baroque period.

== Life ==
Born in Bideford, Richard Mudge was the son of the teacher and cleric Zachariah Mudge (1694–1769), and his wife Mary Fox (died c. 1762). He was baptized on 26 December 1718. The third of five children, he was educated at Pembroke College, Oxford, from 1735, graduating BA in 1738 and MA in 1741. Initially the private chaplain to Heneage Finch, Lord Guernsey (later 3rd Earl of Aylesford), Mudge became curate of the villages of Great and Little Packington in 1741. Between 1745 and 1757 he was Rector at Little Packington, and from 1750 he was also Curate of St. Bartholomew's Chapel in Birmingham. He married Mary Hopkins on 27 March 1747 at St Cross Church, Oxford, with whom he had one daughter, Mary (bap. 1752). After 1756 Lord Guernsey established Mudge in the independent living of Bedworth, where he lived until his death.

== Work ==
In 1749 he published a set of six, string concertos (6 Concertos in Seven Parts). The last five of these are written for two solo violins and string orchestra, and No.1 also has a trumpet part. They are all in the form of a French Overture, with a concluding Minuet, and follow the conventional slow-fast-slow-fast pattern of movements common to the form. All these works show the influence of Handel and Francesco Geminiani, and they were staples of the provincial music society repertoire. The collection also contains an eight-part "Non Nobis Domine".

The first recording of Mudge's concerto set was made in 1957 with Maurice André performing the trumpet concerto. A modern edition of Concertos 1, 4 and 6 had already been edited by Gerald Finzi, but a facsimile edition of the complete set was published in 1993 by King's Music. As late as the 1990s, two portfolios were rediscovered containing other manuscripts of Richard Mudge's music. A recording of the complete set was made by the Swiss Capriccio Barockorchester in 2009 on the Tudor label.
