= Zachary Mudge =

Royal Navy Admiral (1770–1852)

Admiral Zachary Mudge
- Born: 22 January 1770; Plymouth, Devon
- Died: 22 October 1852 (aged 82); Plympton, Devon
- Burial place: Newton Ferrers, Devon
- Relatives: Zachariah Mudge (grandfather); John Mudge (father); Thomas Mudge (uncle); William Mudge (half-brother)
- Military career
- Allegiance: Great Britain; United Kingdom
- Branch: Royal Navy
- Service years: 1780–1815
- Rank: Admiral
- Commands: HMS Fly; HMS Constance; HMS Blanche; HMS Phoenix; HMS Valiant
- Conflicts: American Revolutionary War; French Revolutionary Wars; Napoleonic Wars

Admiral Zachary Mudge (also Zacharia or Zechariah; 22 January 1770 – 22 October 1852) was an officer in the British Royal Navy, best known for serving in the historic Vancouver Expedition.

== Family background ==
Mudge was one of 20 children of the noted physician, Dr. John Mudge, of Plymouth; his mother was John's third wife, Elizabeth. Mudge's grandfather was clergyman Zachariah Mudge. The family included distinguished surveyors and mathematicians. His older half-brother was William Mudge, who developed the Ordnance Survey and was responsible for much of the early detailed mapping of Britain. His uncle Thomas Mudge was a famous horologist. In addition, the family was connected to the politically powerful Pitt family.

== Early naval career ==
Mudge entered the Navy on 1 November 1780 as a captain's servant aboard the 80-gun ship Foudroyant, under the command of Captain John Jervis. He was aboard on 21 April 1782 when she captured, after an action of nearly an hour, the 74-gun Pégase. Mudge then served as a midshipman aboard various ships on the Home and North American Stations; firstly the Pegase and Recovery, commanded by Captain the Honourable George Cranfield Berkeley, then Sampson, Captain Charles Hope, Perseus, Captain George Palmer, Leander, the flagship of Rear-Admiral Herbert Sawyer, and Bombay Castle, Captain Robert Fanshawe.

On 24 May 1789, he was promoted to lieutenant aboard Centurion, flagship at Jamaica of Rear Admiral Philip Affleck, and 26 November transferred to the Carnatic, Captain Ford, at Plymouth. On 20 January 1790, he returned to the Perseus, Captain John Gibson, on the Irish and Channel stations.

== Vancouver Expedition ==
On 15 December 1790, Mudge joined Discovery as second lieutenant; after the Nootka Crisis, he became her first lieutenant and George Vancouver captain. In addition to his other duties, Mudge had been asked to look after the 16-year-old (and future Baron) Thomas Pitt, but was compelled to flog him when the latter used ship stores to purchase romantic favours in Tahiti.

In 1791, they voyaged to Tenerife, Cape Town, Australia, New Zealand, Hawaii and North America. In 1792, they spent a season of exploring the west coast of America, and then put into Nootka Sound to implement the Nootka Sound Convention.

The British and Spanish commanders had been given conflicting instructions, and the primary purpose of the mission could not be completed. Vancouver therefore sent Mudge back to England with dispatches, botanical samples and a request for further orders. He crossed the Pacific to China in the Portuguese-flagged trading vessel Fenis and St. Joseph, a 50-foot open boat carrying 14 men, and from there proceeded home in the Lord Macartney East Indiaman.

On 8 February 1794, Mudge joined Providence as first lieutenant, under William Robert Broughton. They were sent to assist Vancouver but, reaching Monterey, determined that he had left for England. They then surveyed the east coast of Asia.

== Later career ==
Mudge's career advancement had suffered from being away for more than six years. However, through the intercession of Lady Camelford (Pitt's mother), he was promoted to commander on 24 November 1797, and on 8 November 1798 he obtained command of the 16-gun sloop Fly on the North America station. He captured the French privateer cutters Glaneur (5 February 1799) and Trompeur (30 August 1800), in the English Channel, but almost lost his ship in an encounter with an immense iceberg during a passage home from Halifax with despatches from the Commander-in-Chief the Duke of Kent.

Mudge was promoted to post-captain on 15 November 1800, and on 1 April 1801 was appointed to command of sixth-rate Constance. In early 1801, he received the thanks of the British merchants and consuls at Lisbon and Oporto for safely convoying a fleet from Falmouth to Portugal, and also for vessels at Viana, laden with brandy, which he escorted back to England. He also captured the Spanish cutter El Duides, of 8 guns and 69 men, and the privateer lugger Venture, of 2 guns and 27 men, on 7 and 8 June 1801, while off Vigo. Two days later, on 10 June, he captured the merchant ship Wilhelm Georg Frederic, and in July, with the assistance of the sloop Stork, captured El Cantara, a Spanish privateer of 22 guns and 110 men, and her consort, a 10 gun lugger, near Cape Ortegal. Constance was subsequently engaged in conveying foreign soldiers from Lymington to the Elbe.

On 23 September 1802, he was given command of the fifth rate Blanche, and at the end of 1803, was employed at the blockade of Saint-Domingue, where he captured or destroyed 24 enemy vessels in less than a month. Further captures included the French privateer Les Deux Amis, taken on 15 September 1804, in company with the sloop Pelican, the French schooner Gracieuse captured in October 1804, and Amitie in June 1805, each of 14 guns, and also the 4-gun Dutch schooner Nimrod, the 3-gun French privateer Hazard, as well as a large number of merchantmen.

On 15 July 1805 Blanche encountered a French squadron consisting of the 40-gun French frigate Topaze, the 22-gun corvette Department des Landes, the 18-gun Torche, and the 16-gun brig-corvette Faune. Blanche resisted bravely, but she was reduced to a wreck. Mudge ordered her colours struck and she sank sometime later after the French set fire to her. Mudge was court-martialled on the question whether he had made his best defence; he was not only acquitted, but complimented for "very able and gallant" conduct.

From 18 November 1805 to May 1810 he commanded Phoenix in the Bay of Biscay and at Lisbon. In her he captured the merchant Danish brig Kiellestadt in November 1806, and the Vigilante in October 1807, and also the French warships Agile on 29 May 1809, and Charles on 29 January 1810.

Mudge's last command was of the 74-gun Valiant on the Brazilian station from July 1814 to August 1815. He saw no further active service, but was promoted to rear-admiral on 22 July 1830, to vice-admiral on 23 November 1841, and to admiral on 15 September 1849. He died at Plympton on 26 October 1852.

== Legacy ==
Cape Mudge on Quadra Island is named for Zachary Mudge; he was the first European to sight it from a nearby mountain.

The Memoirs of the Mudge family was printed in 1883 in an edition of only 100 copies, edited by Stamford Raffles Flint. Mainly concerning Mudge's grandfather, theologian Zachariah Mudge, it also contains an account of Zachary Mudge's naval career.

In 1855 a memorial window to Zachary Mudge (the "Mudge Window") was placed in St Andrew's Church, Plymouth, England.

== Bibliography ==
- Meany, Edmond S. (1907). Vancouver's Discovery of Puget Sound: Portraits and Biographies of the Men Honored in the Naming of Geographic Features of Northwestern America. Macmillan.
- This article incorporates text from a publication now in the public domain: Laughton, John Knox (1894). "Mudge, Zachary". In Lee, Sidney (ed.). Dictionary of National Biography. Vol. 39. London: Smith, Elder & Co.
