= Enoch Mudge =

American politician

Enoch Mudge (1776–1850) was the first native New Englander to be ordained as a Methodist minister.

== Biography ==
Born in Lynn, Mass. to Enoch and Lydia (Ingalls) Mudge, he was converted under Jesse Lee, the pioneer of Methodism in New England, and entered the ministry in 1793. He labored as an itinerant preacher in Maine until 1799, when his health gave way and he was forced to retire.

He settled in Orrington, Maine, and was twice chosen Representative to the General Court of Massachusetts, in 1811-12 and 1815–16. In 1811 he had much to do with passing the "Religious Freedom Bill," which repealed a law requiring Massachusetts taxpayers of any denomination to pay taxes to support the Congregational Church. In 1814 he was chaplain to a Maine militia regiment that participated in the Battle of Hampden during the War of 1812. In 1816 he moved back to Massachusetts and resumed preaching. From 1832 to 1844 he was pastor of the Seamen's Bethel in New Bedford. There Herman Melville heard him preach, and Mudge was one of the models for the character of Father Mapple in Moby-Dick.

== Publications ==
- The American Camp-meeting Hymn Book: containing a Variety of Original Hymns, published 1818
- Lynn, a Poem written in the Year 1820, published 1826

== Family ==
He married Jerusha Hinkley Holbrook in 1797 and they had four children.

Enoch Mudge was the father of Thomas H. Mudge and the uncle of Zachariah A. Mudge.

His papers are held at Boston University.
