= Thomas H. Mudge =

Thomas Hicks Mudge (1815–1862) was an American Methodist Episcopal clergyman, born at Orrington, Me., the nephew of Enoch Mudge.

He graduated from Wesleyan University in 1840 and from Union Theological Seminary in 1843. He then entered the ministry, joining the New England conference. After several pastorates in New England, he became professor of sacred literature in McKendree University, Lebanon, Illinois, serving from 1857 to 1859. Later, he held pastorates in Saint Louis, Missouri, and Baldwin, Kansas.

His papers are held at Boston University.
