= Zachariah A. Mudge =

American clergyman, author (1813–1888)

Zachariah Atwell Mudge (1813–1888) was an American Methodist Episcopal clergyman and author, nephew of Enoch Mudge.

Mudge was born at Orrington, Maine, and was educated at Wesleyan University. He entered the ministry in 1840 and held various pastorates in Massachusetts. For three years he was editor of the Guide to Holiness.

His papers are held at Boston University.

== Works ==
- Memoir of Cyrus Shepherd (1848)
- Views from Plymouth Rock (1861)
- The Christian Statesman: A Portraiture of Sir Thomas Fowell Buxton (1865)
- The Forest Boy: The Sketch of the Life of A. Lincoln (1867)
- Footprints of Roger Williams (1871)
- Arctic Heroes (1875)
- North Pole Voyages (1875)
- An Easy Lesson Book for Infant Scholars, the sale of which reached into the hundreds of thousands. It was translated into the Urdu language by James Mudge, who also wrote a Memorial of his uncle.
- Fur Clad Adventurers; or, Travels in Skin-Canoes, on Dog-Sledges, on Reindeer, and on Snow-Shoes, through Alaska, Kamchatka, and Eastern Siberia (1882)
