= Zachariah Mudge (priest) =

English clergyman

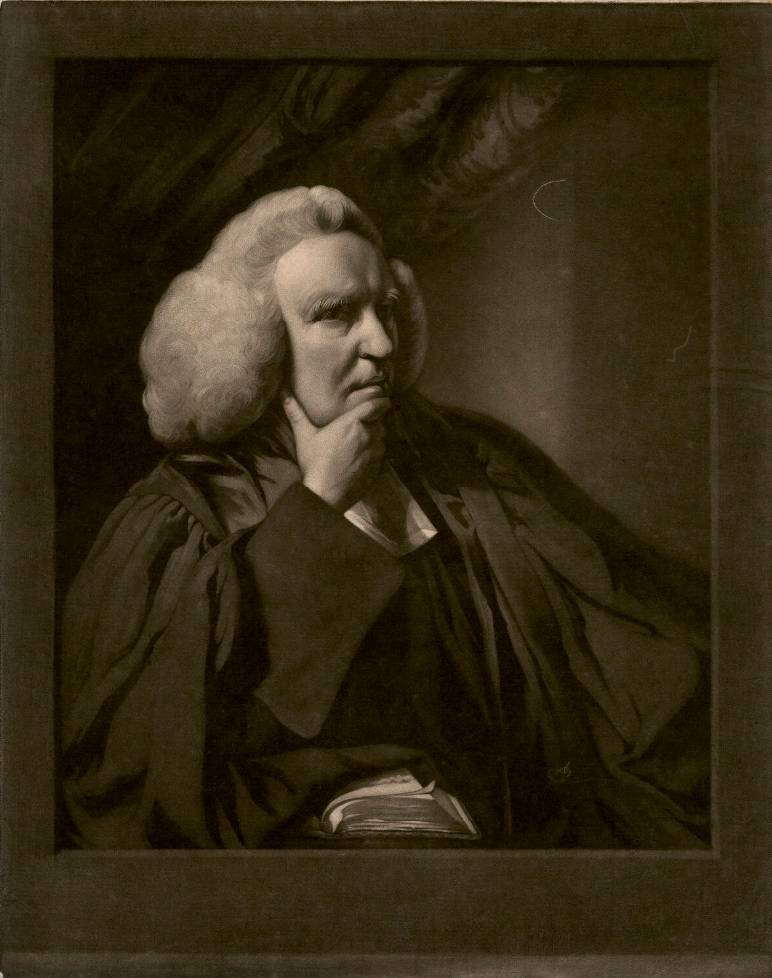
- Born: 1694
- Died: 2 April 1769
- Spouses: Mary Fox; Elizabeth Neell
- Children: 5, including Thomas, Richard, and John
- Church: Church of England
- Ordained: 21 September 1729

Zachariah Mudge (1694–1769) was an English clergyman, known for his sermons, and his deist or Platonist views.

== Life ==
He was born at Exeter, and after attending its grammar school was sent in 1710 to the nonconformist academy of Joseph Hallett III. When there he fell in love with a certain Mary Fox, who refused to take him seriously. He went on the road for London, but returned to Exeter after three weeks of hard knocks. In 1711 George Trosse, who had paid for his schooling, died and left Mudge half of his library, including a number of Hebrew works.

About 1713 he left Hallett's, and became second master in the school of John Reynolds, vicar of St. Thomas the Apostle in Exeter. John Reynolds's son Samuel, master of Exeter grammar school, was the father of Sir Joshua Reynolds, and Mudge soon became the intimate friend of three generations of the family. Mudge was painted on three separate occasions by Sir Joshua Reynolds, in 1761, 1762, and 1766.

In 1714 he married his former love, Mary Fox. In the winter of 1717–18 he left Exeter to become master of Bideford grammar school. Here he remained until 1732. While at Bideford he entered into a long correspondence with Stephen Weston, Bishop of Exeter on the doctrines of the Church of England, which resulted in his giving up on nonconformist ministry and becoming an Anglican; he sent money to the West of England Nonconformist Association for the expenses of his education.

He was ordained deacon in the Church of England on 21 September 1729, and priest on the following day. In December of the same year he was instituted to the living of Abbotsham, near Bideford, on the presentation of Peter King, 1st Baron King, and in August 1732 he obtained the living of St. Andrew's, Plymouth. Mudge was made a prebendary of Exeter Cathedral in 1736.

In 1759, after the last mason's work had been completed on the Eddystone Lighthouse, and Laus Deo cut on the last stone set over the door of the lantern, John Smeaton conducted Mudge, his old friend, to the top. There they joined in singing the Old Hundredth Psalm, as a thanksgiving for the successful conclusion of the arduous undertaking. Reynolds introduced Mudge to Samuel Johnson in 1762. Mudge died at Coffleet, Devon, on the first stage of his annual trip to London, on 2 April 1769. He was buried by the communion table of St. Andrew's, Plymouth, and his funeral sermon was preached by John Gandy, his curate for many years, who succeeded to the vicarage. Johnson drew Mudge's character in the London Chronicle for 2 June and wrote:

Though studious he was popular, though argumentative he was modest, though inflexible he was candid, and though metaphysical he was orthodox.

== Works ==
Mudge harmonised well with the unemotional form of religion that was dominant in his day. James Boswell wrote that he was idolised in the West of England, and sermons were greatly esteemed for fifty years after his death, particularly as suitable for Oxford students. He published a selection of them in 1739. One on ‘The Origin and Obligations of Government’ was reprinted by Edmund Burke in the form of a pamphlet in 1793, as an antidote against Jacobin principles. Another, separately published in 1731, was entitled ‘Liberty: a Sermon preached in the Cathedral Church of St. Peter, Exon, on Thursday, 16 September 1731, before the Gentlemen educated in the Free School at Exeter under the Rev. Mr. Reynolds.’ It contained some reflections on the nonconformists, which were answered in ‘Fate and Force, or Mr. Mudge's Liberty set in a true Light,’ London, 1732.

In 1744 he issued ‘An Essay towards a New English Version of the Book of Psalms from the original Hebrew,’ London, 1744. The translation was conservative of old phraseology.

== Family ==
By his first wife, Mary, Mudge had four sons - Zachariah (1714–1753), a surgeon, who died on board an Indiaman at Canton; Thomas, the horologist; Richard, a composer, clergyman and friend of Handel; and John, a physician; as well as one daughter, Mary. Mudge remarried in 1762; his second wife was Elizabeth Neell, who died in 1782. Mudge had several grandchildren, including the British Naval officer, Zachary Mudge and the British Army officer, William Mudge.
