= William Mudge =

English artillery officer and surveyor (1762–1820)

Major-General William Mudge FRS
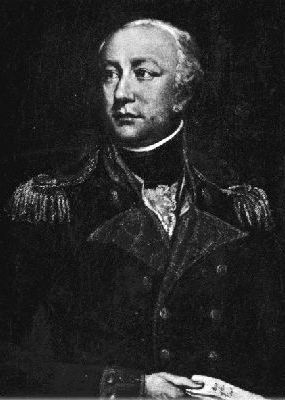
- Born: 1 December 1762; Plymouth, England
- Died: 17 April 1820 (aged 57)
- Known for: Triangulation of Britain

William Mudge (1762–1820) was an English artillery officer and surveyor, born in Plymouth, an important figure in the work of the Ordnance Survey.

== Life ==
William Mudge was a son of Dr. John Mudge of Plymouth, by his second wife, and grandson of Zachariah Mudge, and was born at Plymouth on 1 December 1762. He entered the Royal Military Academy, Woolwich, on 17 April 1777, and while he was there his godfather, Samuel Johnson, paid him a visit, and gave him a guinea and a book. On 9 July 1779 he received a commission as second lieutenant in the Royal Artillery, and was sent to South Carolina to join the army under Charles Cornwallis, 1st Marquess Cornwallis. He was promoted first lieutenant on 16 May 1781. On his return home he was stationed at the Tower of London, and studied the higher mathematics under Charles Hutton, amusing himself in his spare time with the construction of clocks. He was appointed in 1791 to the Ordnance Trigonometrical Survey, of which he was promoted to be director on the death of Colonel Edward Williams in 1798. He was elected a Fellow of the Royal Society the same year.

Around 1800 Dunnose was taken as a base point for a triangulation of Great Britain, in which Mudge measured a section of the meridional arc running up into Yorkshire. The triangulation was conducted in 1801 and 1802. The positions of twenty three points between Dunnose (Note: The survey point was marked by an iron gun sunk into the ground on the summit of Shanklin Down, near the village of Shanklin. Dunnose is actually the next projecting point to the south of Shanklin Down.) and Beacon Hill, Clifton, near Doncaster, were determined, and the closest possible measurements were made of the distances between the points and the direction from one point to another. Doubts were cast on the accuracy of the measurements in 1812, when Joseph Rodriguez pointed out that, if they were accurate, the length of a degree of longitude did not vary with latitude as it should if the earth were flattened at the poles.

Mudge was promoted brevet major on 25 September 1801, regimental major 14 September 1803, and lieutenant-colonel 20 July 1804. While at the head of the survey he resided first, until 1808, at the Tower of London, and afterwards at 4 Holles Street, London, which he purchased; there he resided for the rest of his life. He was appointed in addition, on 29 July 1809, by John Pitt, 2nd Earl of Chatham, to be lieutenant-governor of the Royal Military Academy at Woolwich; and when in 1810 it was decided to move the Indian cadets to Addiscombe Military Seminary, Mudge was appointed public examiner to the new college. He took pains to see that the Woolwich and the Addiscombe cadets were trained in surveying and topographical drawing, and placed them before leaving college under Robert Dawson of the Ordnance Survey for a course of practical study.

In 1813 it was determined to extend the Meridian arc into Scotland. Mudge superintended the general arrangement of the work, and in some cases took the actual measurement. On the extension of the English arc of the meridian into Scotland, the French Bureau des Longitudes applied for permission for Jean-Baptiste Biot to make observations for them on that line. These observations were carried out by Biot, with the assistance of Mudge and of his son Richard Zachariah Mudge, at Leith Fort on the River Forth, and Biot assisted Mudge in extending the arc to Uist in the Outer Hebrides. It is to Mudge that William Wordsworth alludes in his poem Written with a Slate Pencil on a Stone, on the Side of the Mountain of Black Comb, on Black Combe, written in 1811–1813; Wordsworth had heard in Bootle from the Rev. James Satterthwaite the story of the surveyor (identified with Mudge) on top of Black Combe, famous for its long-distance views inland and out to sea, who was not able to see even the map in front of him when fog or darkness closed in.

On 4 June 1813 Mudge was promoted brevet-colonel, and on 20 December 1814 regimental colonel. In 1817 he received from the University of Edinburgh the degree of LL.D. In 1818 he travelled in France for the benefit of his health, and on his return was appointed a commissioner of the new board of longitude. In 1819 Frederick VI of Denmark visited the survey operations at Bagshot Heath, and presented Mudge with a gold chronometer. In May of this year he began the survey of Scotland, and on 12 August he was promoted major-general. He died on 17 April 1820.

== Works ==
Mudge contributed to the Royal Society's Philosophical Transactions:

- 'Account of the Trigonometrical Survey made in 1797, 1798, and 1799.'
- 'Account of the Measurement of an Arc of the Meridian from Dunnose, Isle of Wight, to Clifton in Yorkshire.' Online in the Philosophical Transactions
- 'On the Measurement of Three Degrees of the Meridian conducted in England by William Mudge.'

Besides the maps of the survey published under his direction, he published:

- 'General Survey of England and Wales,’ pt. i. fol. 1805.
- 'An Account of the Trigonometrical Survey carried on by Order of the Master-General of H.M. Ordnance in the years 1800–1809, by William Mudge and Thomas Colby.'
- 'An Account of the Operations carried on for accomplishing a Trigonometrical Survey of England and Wales from the commencement in 1784 to the end of 1796. First published in, and now revised from, the "Philosophical Transactions", by William Mudge and Isaac Dalby. The Second Volume, continued from 1797 to the end of 1799, by William Mudge. The Third Volume, an Account of the Trigonometrical Survey in 1800, 1801, 1803 to 1809, by William Mudge and Thomas Colby,’ 3 vols. London, 1799–1811.
- 'Sailing Directions for the N.E., N., and N.W. Coasts of Ireland, partly drawn up by William Mudge, completed by G. A. Fraser,’ London, 1842.

== Family ==
Mudge married Margaret Jane, third daughter of Major-general Williamson, R.A., who survived him four years. He left a daughter, two sons in the royal engineers, one in the Royal Artillery, and one in the Royal Navy.

== Notes and references ==
Notes

Citations

Sources

- Kater, Captain Henry (1819). "Capt. Kater's experiments for determining the variation in the length of the pendulum vibrating seconds.". Philosophical Transactions of the Royal Society of London. Royal Society of London.
- Kater, Captain H. (1820). "Kater on Pendulums". The Edinburgh Review, Or Critical Journal. Longmans, Green & Company.
- Mudge, William; Dalby, Isaac; Colby, Thomas (1799). An account of the operations carried out for accomplishing a trigonometrical survey of England and Wales ... W. Faden.
- Mudge, William; Colby, Thomas (1811). An Account of the Trigonometrical Survey, Carried on by Order of the Master-General of His Majesty's Ordnance, in the Years 1800-1809. W. Faden.
- Playfair, John (1822). Review of Mudge's Account of the Trigonometrical Survey of England. Constable. p. 179. (An article in Part IV of The works of Playfair. Another copy is available at Archive.org.
- Murray, Hugh; Wallace, William; Jameson, Robert; Hooker, William Jackson; William Swainson; Thomas Gamaliel Bradford (1837). The encyclopædia of geography: comprising a complete description of the earth, physical, statistical, civil, and political; exhibiting its relation to the heavenly bodies, its physical structure, the natural history of each country, and the industry, commerce, political institutions, and civil and social state of all nations. Carey, Lea and Blanchard. p. 141.
- Thomas, Brook (1998). Literature and the Nation. Gunter Narr Verlag. p. 83. ISBN 978-3-8233-4168-0.
- Vetch, Robert Hamilton (1894). "Mudge, William (1762-1820)" . Dictionary of National Biography. Vol. 39. pp. 258–259.

Attribution

- This article incorporates text from a publication now in the public domain: Vetch, Robert Hamilton (1894). "Mudge, William (1762-1820)". In Lee, Sidney (ed.). Dictionary of National Biography. Vol. 39. London: Smith, Elder & Co. pp. 258–259.
