= William John Crozier =

American physiologist (1892–1955)

- Born: May 24, 1892; New York City, New York
- Died: November 2, 1955 (aged 63)
- Known for: Work on animal behaviour and sensory processes
- Scientific career
- Fields: Psychology, Physiology

William John Crozier ([ˈkrōZHər]; May 24, 1892 – November 2, 1955) was an American physiologist who contributed to the field of psychology through his works on animal behaviour and sensory processes.

Crozier spent the time between 1918–1925 as a professor at different schools including the University of Illinois Medical School and the University of Chicago. In 1927, he became a professor at Harvard where he worked until he retired. He ran a General Physiology laboratory at the University of Harvard, which attracted many young researchers, the most notable being B.F. Skinner.

Crozier spent his time studying the different types of tropisms, as well as the different factors that affected the behaviour of tropisms. Crozier came up with the "parametric analysis" of behaviour, which he believed to be his greatest contribution. In terms of his work in the field of sensory processing, Crozier contributed to the Handbook of General Experimental Psychology, in 1934, by writing a chapter about chemoreception. Throughout his life, Crozier wrote a total of about 300 scientific papers. He died in Belmont in 1955 at the age of 63 due to a heart attack.

== Education and early life ==
William John Crozier was born on May 24, 1892, in New York City to William George Crozier and Bessie Mackay. Crozier started his education at the College of the City of New York, pursuing a degree in physical chemistry and biochemistry. He graduated with an undergraduate degree in 1912 before continuing his education in zoology at Harvard and obtaining a PhD in 1915. Having a passion for zoology, Crozier spent the next three years conducting research about the behaviours of various marine organisms at the Bermuda Biological Station. During these three years of conducting research on marine organisms, Crozier wrote a chapter about chemoreception for the Handbook of General Experimental Psychology.

== Research and academic career ==
Between the years 1918 and 1925, Crozier was named assistant professor at many different schools: in 1918–1919, he was named assistant professor of physiology at the University of Illinois Medical School; in 1919 he was named assistant professor of zoology at the University of Chicago; in 1920–1925, he was named professor and head of the department of zoology at Rutgers University; and in 1925, he was named associate professor and head of the Department of General Physiology at Harvard University. After years of being an assistant professor, Crozier was named a full professor at Harvard University in 1927.

Crozier studied marine biology and animal behaviour using experimental design and parametric analysis. He used this methodology in order to study visual processes. Crozier and his students divided their research into two main fields: the first having to do with tropisms, and the second having to do with studying the effects that temperature had on the actions in poikilothermic organisms, as well as its effects on biological oxidation.

Crozier spent most of his time studying different physiological phenomena. However, he influenced the field of experimental psychology through his works regarding animal behaviour as well as various sensory processes.

Cozier also contributed to the field of ophthalmology through his focus on the mechanisms of light stimulus on vision.

== Influences ==
During Crozier’s time at Harvard, students became interested in him and his work, particularly in the general physiology lab. This helped Cozier gain more lab support. One of the students influenced by Crozier was B. F. Skinner. Crozier was exploring the ways in which different environmental forces could have an effect on an organism's behaviour, which he and Skinner both understood as the study of reflexes. Their research would go on to influence Skinner in his studies of behaviourism.

Jacques Loeb, a teacher that Crozier was influenced by, and Crozier are linked to B. F. Skinner's application of the word organism. Skinner studied entire unharmed organism's behaviours instead of studying their reflexes by opening the organism and viewing mechanisms separately. He was influenced by Loeb who always talked about studying organisms without surgically harming them, and instead looking at them in their entirety. Skinner was able to go through with his studies on this topic by being under the watch of William John Crozier.

== Legacy ==
Crozier influenced Charles Winsor, a statistician, who later went on to develop the theory of Winsorization, and influenced B.F. Skinner and the field of psychology. Crozier's research also spanned to the United Kingdom where the British Journal of Ophthalmology published an obituary highlighting his research having influenced the Institute of Ophthalmology in London.
