= Food, Conservation, and Energy Act of 2008 =

United States federal law

- Long title: An act to provide for the continuation of agricultural programs through fiscal year 2012, and for other purposes.
- Nicknames: 2008 U.S. Farm Bill; Agricultural Security Improvement Act of 2008
- Enacted by: the 110th United States Congress
- Effective: June 18, 2008

Citations
- Public law: 110–246
- Statutes at Large: 122 Stat. 1651 through 122 Stat. 2313 (662 pages)

Legislative history
- Introduced in the House of Representatives as H.R. 6124 by Collin Peterson (D–MN) on May 22, 2008; Committee consideration by Agriculture, Foreign Affairs; Passed the House of Representatives on May 22, 2008 (306–110); Passed the Senate on June 5, 2008 (77–15); Vetoed by President George W. Bush on June 18, 2008; Overridden by the House of Representatives on June 18, 2008 (317-109); Overridden by the Senate and became law on June 18, 2008 (80–14)

Food, Conservation, and Energy Act of 2008
- Long title: An act to provide for the continuation of agricultural programs through fiscal year 2012, and for other purposes.
- Nicknames: 2008 U.S. Farm Bill; Agricultural Security Improvement Act of 2008
- Enacted by: the 110th United States Congress
- Effective: May 22, 2008

Citations
- Public law: 110–234
- Statutes at Large: 122 Stat. 923 through 122 Stat. 1551 (628 pages)

Codification
- Acts repealed: May 22, 2008

Legislative history
- Introduced in the House of Representatives as H.R. 2419 by Collin Peterson (D–MN) on May 22, 2007; Committee consideration by Agriculture, Foreign Affairs; Passed the House of Representatives on July 27, 2007 (231–191); Passed the Senate as the Food and Energy Security Act on December 14, 2007 (79–14); Reported by the joint conference committee on May 13, 2008; agreed to by the House of Representatives on May 14, 2008 (318–106) and by the Senate on May 15, 2008 (81–15); Vetoed by President George W. Bush on May 21, 2008; Overridden by the House of Representatives on May 21, 2008 (316–108); Overridden by the Senate and became law on May 22, 2008 (82–13)

The Food, Conservation, and Energy Act of 2008 (Pub. L. 110–246 (text) (PDF), H.R. 6124, 122 Stat. 1651, enacted June 18, 2008, also known as the 2008 U.S. Farm Bill) was a $288 billion, five-year agricultural policy bill that was passed into law by the United States Congress on June 18, 2008. The bill was a continuation of the 2002 Farm Bill. It continues the United States' long history of agricultural subsidies as well as pursuing areas such as energy, conservation, nutrition, and rural development. Some specific initiatives in the bill include increases in Food Stamp benefits, increased support for the production of cellulosic ethanol, and money for the research of pests, diseases and other agricultural problems.

On January 1, 2013, Congress passed the American Taxpayer Relief Act of 2012 to avert the fiscal cliff and the next day President Barack Obama signed the Act into law. (Public Law No: 112-240) The "fiscal cliff" deal was primarily enacted to avoid automatic tax hikes and spending cuts, but also included provisions extending portions of the 2008 Farm Bill for nine months through September 30, 2013. Senate Majority Leader Harry Reid demonstrated a commitment to working on a new five-year Farm Bill by reintroducing last session's Senate Farm Bill in the 113th Congress.

== Legislative history ==
One version of this legislation, the Farm, Nutrition, and Bioenergy Act of 2007 was passed by the United States House of Representatives on July 27, 2007. Despite opposition from some senators, including a failed amendment proposal by Senator Richard Lugar and a veto threat by President Bush, the Senate version of the bill, called the Food and Energy Security Act, was passed by the Senate Agriculture Committee on October 25, 2007, and later by the full Senate on December 14. In late April 2008, congressional negotiators finally reached a deal to reconcile the House and Senate bills. The deal increased spending on food stamps and other food programs while mostly maintaining the current farm subsidies, despite record farm profits.

On May 15, the House and Senate passed the bill, but President Bush issued a veto on May 21. The House voted to overturn the president's veto shortly thereafter, and with the margins by which the bill was passed, a Senate override also occurred; so the Congress overrode the president's veto, passing the bill into law (Pub. L. 110–234 (text) (PDF), H.R. 2419, 122 Stat. 923, enacted May 22, 2008). However, the veto override was moot, as a 34-page section of the bill was omitted in the version sent to the White House. In effect, the President vetoed a bill Congress never considered. The bill had to be re-passed by Congress.

The House passed the Farm Bill again on May 22, and the Senate shortly thereafter. President Bush again vetoed the measure, but this veto was overridden in both Houses on June 18, so the Farm Bill in its entirety became law. A similar situation occurred in 2005 with the Deficit Reduction Act, where in the enrolling process certain mistakes were made changing the text of the bill. In that case, the bill was considered to be law even with the mistakes since the Speaker of the House and the President Pro Tem of the Senate attested that the language sent to the President was indeed the text that was passed by Congress..

The bill originally caused controversy because the "pay-as-you-go" (Clause 10 of Rule XXI of the Rules of the United States House of Representatives) rule was waived. That rule prohibits the consideration of bills that increase the deficit in either a six-year period or an eleven-year period. The bill itself did not cause such an increase if using a "baseline", which is an estimate of future revenue and spending levels of the U.S. government, that was issued in 2007. A more recent baseline, issued in 2008, showed a large increase in the deficit over the applicable time periods. While other points of order are waived under certain circumstances, the paygo point of order is rarely ignored.

== Provisions ==
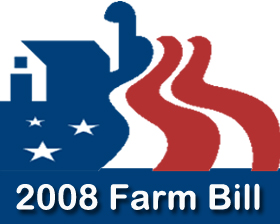
2008 U.S. Farm Bill logo.

In regard to farm regulation, this Act focused on adjusting payment levels and eligibility requirements while bringing forth a new Average Crop Revenue Election program. Along with this, a permanent disaster assistance program was introduced with adjustments to the crop insurance program. Several new titles looked towards horticultural crops, organic agriculture, livestock, and poultry. Also, funding is increased and more programs are instituted to support producers who are alternating to organic agriculture. Some new rules were implemented within the Act for governing hog and poultry production contracts and also safety regarding poultry plant foods.

As for conservation, working land conservation and improved environmental practices were implemented. An expansion of the Conservation Security Program gives rise to the new Conservation Stewardship Program which is a voluntary program that influences producers to address resource concerns. This involved improving, maintaining, and managing conservation practices that already exist and also taking part in extra activities. The same changes apply to the energy title of the Act which also expanded the development of bio-based energy sources along with other renewable sources. Tax provisions on biofuels such as ethanol were introduced as well.

== Components ==
The Act accelerated the commercialization of advanced biofuels, including cellulosic ethanol, encourage the production of biomass crops, and expand the current Renewable Energy and Energy Efficiency Program.

On April 29, 2008, the Farm Bill contained three major components:

- The Average Crop Revenue Election (ACRE) program that will allow farmers to choose revenue-based, market oriented protection instead of subsidy payments based on politically set target prices;
- $4 billion over baseline funding for conservation and working lands programs;
- Funding for local food programs such as the Farmers Market Promotion Program, Community Food Project grants and the Healthy Food Enterprise Development Center—programs.
- This bill included a single line provision (Sec. 14219. Elimination of statute of limitations applicable to collection of debt by administrative offset.) which has already been implemented to collect the tax debt of grandparents.

=== Main sections ===
Section 9003 of the Food, Conservation, and Energy Act of 2008 provided for grants covering up to 30% of the cost of developing and building demonstration-scale biorefineries for producing "advanced biofuels", which essentially includes all fuels that are not produced from corn kernel starch. It also allows for loan guarantees of up to $250 million for building commercial-scale biorefineries to produce advanced biofuels. The bill funds the biorefinery program by drawing $75 million in funds from the Commodity Credit Corporation (CCC) for fiscal year (FY) 2009, increasing to $245 million by FY 2010. It also authorizes $150 million per year in discretionary funds for the program.

Section 15321 of the bill established a new tax credit for producers of cellulosic biofuels, that is, biofuels produced from wood, grasses, or the non-edible parts of plants. The new cellulosic biofuel producer credit is set at $1.01 per gallon and applies only to fuel produced and used as fuel in the United States. In addition, Section 9005 of the bill provided $55 million in CCC funds in FY 2009 to support advanced biofuel production, increasing to $105 million by FY 2012. It also authorizes up to $25 million per year in discretionary funding.

The more crop-oriented measures include Section 9010 of the bill, which allowed the CCC to buy sugar from U.S. producers and sell it to bioenergy producers, and Section 9011, which creates the Biomass Crop Assistance Program to support the establishment and production of biomass crops.

Section 9007 of the bill renames the U.S. Department of Agriculture's current Renewable Energy and Energy Efficiency Program as the "Rural Energy for America Program", providing $55 million in CCC funds for FY 2009, increasing to $70 million for FY 2011 and 2012, while authorizing another $25 million in discretionary funds. The program will provide grants of up to 25% of the cost of renewable energy systems and energy efficiency improvements for agricultural producers and rural small businesses, as well as guarantees for loans as large as $25 million.

Section 9009 of the bill creates a new "Rural Energy Self-Sufficiency Initiative", which will support efforts to develop community-wide renewable energy systems. The bill provides no firm funding for the initiative but authorizes up to $5 million per year in discretionary funds.

Section 9013 also authorizes up to $5 million per year to support community-wide wood-fueled energy systems.

== Energy efficiency, renewable energy and progress ==
The USDA announced on 2008-08-27 that 639 farms and rural businesses in 43 states and the Virgin Islands had been selected to receive $35 million in grants and loan guarantees for renewable energy systems and energy efficiency improvements. While many of the awards typically go towards more energy-efficient grain dryers, the USDA notes that a farm in Iowa will use its grant to replace a propane heating system with a geothermal heating system, while a firm in Louisiana will purchase energy-efficient electric motors for an irrigation well.

On January 16, 2009, the USDA also announced the first loan guarantee for a commercial-scale cellulosic ethanol plant.

Section 9003 allowed the USDA Rural Development office to approve this $80 million loan to Range Fuels Inc. Range Fuels produces low carbon bio fuels from any and all biomass. The $80 million loan is dedicated to building a facility that will produce cellulosic ethanol from wood chips. In 2010 the plant is expected to achieve an output level of 20 million gallons of ethanol per year. Other benefits of the plant include an estimated 63 jobs that will be created to build and operate the facility.

The grants and loans were awarded through the Renewable Energy Systems and Energy Efficiency Improvements Program of the USDA Rural Development office. The program was created by Section 9006 of the 2002 Farm Bill and expanded under the 2008 Farm Bill.

A few renewable energy source programs under the act included:

- Bio-refinery Assistance Program: This program aided those who sought help in development and construction of their biorefinery.
- Repowering Assistance: USDA provided $35 million in funds to assist biorefineries in transferring to alternate energy sources for heating and powering their facilities.
- Bioenergy Program for Advanced Biofuels: This program gave payments to agricultural producers for the use of advanced biofuels which included fuels obtained from renewable biomass. Around $300 million in funds were released to the program.
- Biodiesel Education Program: $1 million annually was distributed to this program to make fleet owners aware of the benefits of biodiesel.
- Biomass Research and Development: $118 million was allocated to this area and mainly worked towards the benefit of universities, laboratories, and research agencies.
- Rural Energy Self-Sufficiency Initiative: The goal of this program was to inform a community of its energy use by providing assessments of the location and an analysis of where savings were possible. $5 million annually was available for this program.
- Biomass Crop Assistance Program: The government issued funds for up to 75% of the cost of research to produce crops for the conversion of bioenergy.
- Forest Biomass for Energy Program: This program focused on getting people to use forest biomass for energy and appropriated $15 million annually to the cause.

== Food assistance ==
Food and Nutrition Programs comprise approximately 80% of the total 2008 Food, Conservation & Energy Act bill budget. Improvements to domestic food nutrition and assistance for low-income families is greatly supported by the bill. This area provides for the Supplemental Nutrition Assistance Program (SNAP), Emergency Food Assistance Program, as well as the free fresh fruit and vegetable snack program which is meant to help schools with students in need. Also, the act provides help for organizations such as food banks and soup kitchens. Promoting savings is another provision of the act by improving resources limits and no longer counting tax-preferred retirement accounts and education accounts toward the limit of resources. The purchasing power of SNAP is also going to stop losing value each year under the act and the rules of SNAP will fully account for annual inflation.

The bill also increased funding, with the program being available in 35 elementary schools in each state. It allows more schools to be added in proportion to the student population of each state and schools are selected based on free and reduced lunch percentage. The program no longer permits nuts but rather looks to fresh fruits and vegetables instead. With the extra nutrition title funding, it appropriates $4 million to establish a pilot program in many different schools in several states. This will provide whole grain products to participating school nutrition programs. $50 million a year is distributed to provide schools with fresh fruits and vegetables with the help of the Farm Bill while $3 million is used to conduct surveys about the school nutrition to examine what exactly the students eat.

== Opposition ==
Reports from the United Nations and the World Trade Organization (WTO) in 2007 criticized the United States and other developed nations for their continued farm trade subsidies. Such subsidies, according to the reports, prevent fair competition from developing nations. Because of its continued refusal to conform to WTO guidelines, the United States was the target of up to $4 billion of potential trade sanctions by Brazil.

President George W. Bush also expressed opposition to the bill, and vetoed it because of its high cost and negative impact on poorer farmers; his veto threat enabled numerous Republican congressmen to attach pork to it, making the bill more expensive than it would have been otherwise, since Democratic leaders needed Republican votes to override the veto. Bush claimed that it was too generous for already wealthy farmers who did not truly need the extra financial assistance. Others argued that the bill should include more subsidies for renewable energy. In negotiations between Congressional legislators and the White House, Bush indicated that the cap on payments to anyone making over $750,000 per year was still too high, and that if the cap were lowered to anyone making over $200,000, he would support the bill.

Food experts, international aid groups, and the White House suggested that the bill did not focus enough on the globally growing food crisis around the world. Some of the money could have been used to feed poor children who were suffering in other countries but instead farmers in the United States, whom the bill was supposedly designed to assist, were largely flourishing. Only about one percent of the bill's total cost was sent abroad to provide a relatively small amount of food relief to those in need. International aid groups criticized farm bills in the United States for ignoring poor farmers in developing countries by causing them to compete with wealthy, taxpaying American farmers. Billions of dollars in subsidies were distributed to these farmers no matter how much they grow, the groups said, and lawmakers failed to help the people in need.

== Payment limits ==
A major factor and controversial issue involved in the act included the amount of payments the farmers were receiving. Many people who qualified to receive funding were taking advantage of this opportunity by taking steps to substantially increase the funds they were gaining. This included getting access to more land thus leading to more government funds or even using a spouse to potentially be eligible for more payments. Spouses were automatically credited for being married to an actively engaged farmer which allowed for more benefits. So in order to prevent this, certain laws were enacted within the act that reduced this problem so that large operations would be less likely to try and game the system and collect high amounts of direct payments.

One of the limits that was imposed under the Farm Bill's laws was that farms are not eligible if non-farm income exceeds $500,000 or if gross farm income is over $750,000 over a three-year period. Direct and Counter-Cyclical Program limits are the same as what they were in the 2002 Farm Bill. Payments are limited to $40,000 for Direct Payments and for Counter-Cyclical Payments to $65,000 per entity. Also, a limit of $65,000 per individual is placed under ACRE payments. The only real requirement for being able to receive these program payments is to be actively engaged in farming, contributing capital, land, or machinery, and providing labor/management.

== Research ==
The bill created the National Institute of Food and Agriculture (NIFA) which consolidated federal sector agricultural research. In addition the bill mandated:

- $78 million total for organic agriculture research, fiscal year (FY) 09-12 [+ $25 million/year authorized, subject to appropriations]
- $230 million total for specialty crops research, FY09-12 [+ $100 million/year authorized]
- $118 million total for biomass research and development, FY08-12 [+ $35 million/year authorized]
- IFAFS were still authorized, but the $200 million in mandatory funding per year was removed.
- All mandatory funds were to be distributed by the new NIFA through competitive grants.
