= Average Crop Revenue Election =

The U.S. Farm Service Agency administers Annual Crop Revenue Election (ACRE, a backronym), a new program authorized by the 2008 Farm Bill that begins in crop year 2009. Through ACRE, the United States Department of Agriculture (USDA) offers producers an alternative to the Direct and Counter-Cyclical Program. The ACRE alternative provides eligible producers a state-level revenue guarantee, based on the 5-year state Olympic average yield and the 2-year national average price. ACRE payments are made when both state- and farm-level triggers are met. By participating in ACRE, producers elect to forgo counter-cyclical payments, receive a 20-percent reduction in direct payments and a 30-percent reduction in CCC commodity loan rates. A decision to elect ACRE binds the elected land to the program through the 2012 crop year, the last crop year covered by the 2008 Farm Bill.

Because of tradeoffs with electing ACRE over DCP and the irrevocable commitment to ACRE, producers are encouraged to review ACRE decision tools from State extension and other sources to help evaluate the choices.
