= Charles Winsor =

American statistician (1895–1951)

Charles Paine Winsor (June 19, 1895 – April 4, 1951) was an American engineer, physiologist and biostatistician.

Winsor was born in Boston to Frederick Winsor and Mary Anna Lee Winsor in 1895. He studied at Harvard University where he obtained 2 degrees (AB and SB) in engineering. From 1921 to 1927 he worked as an engineer at the New England Telephone and Telegraph Company. His interest in biology made him switch career and he moved to Baltimore to work for Raymond Pearl, and he returned to Harvard to finish his PhD in 1935 in general physiology under W. J. Crozier. Following this, from 1938 to 1941 he worked at the Statistical Laboratory at Iowa State College as Assistant Professor of mathematics. During the war he worked at Princeton University under a contract from the Office of Scientific Research and Development. Following the war, in 1946 he went back to Baltimore and become Assistant Professor of Biostatistics in the School of Hygiene and Public Health, Johns Hopkins University. It was during this time that he became the editor of the scientific journal Human Biology. He died suddenly (cause not stated) April 4, 1951 at the age of 55. He was survived by his wife Agnes Winsor.

He is most known for inventing the method of winsorization in statistics, which is now named after him. He was named a Fellow of the American Statistical Association in 1949.

== Selected works ==
- Winsor, C. P. (1932). "The Gompertz curve as a growth curve". Proceedings of the National Academy of Sciences of the United States of America. 18 (1): 1–8. Bibcode:1932PNAS...18....1W. doi:10.1073/pnas.18.1.1. PMC 1076153. PMID 16577417.
- Winsor, C. P. (1946). "Which regression?". Biometrics Bulletin. 2 (6): 101–109. doi:10.2307/3002018. JSTOR 3002018. PMID 20287814.
- Hastings, C.; Mosteller, F.; Tukey, J. W.; Winsor, C. P. (1947). "Low moments for small samples: a comparative study of order statistics". The Annals of Mathematical Statistics. 18 (3): 413–426. doi:10.1214/aoms/1177730388.
- Tukey, J.; Bode, H.; Mosteller, F.; Winsor, C. (1949). "The education of a scientific generalist". Science. 109 (2840): 553–558. Bibcode:1949Sci...109..553B. doi:10.1126/science.109.2840.553. PMID 17743271.
- Turner, T. B.; Hollander, D. H.; Buckley, S.; Kokko, U. P.; Winsor, C. P. (1950). "Age incidence and seasonal development of neutralizing antibodies to lansing poliomyelitis virus". American Journal of Hygiene. 52 (3): 323–47. doi:10.1093/oxfordjournals.aje.a119427. PMID 14789759.

== See also ==
- Robust statistics
