= Farmers Market Promotion Program =

The Farmers Market Promotion Program is a United States Department of Agriculture (USDA) program established by the 2002 farm bill (P.L. 107–171, Sec. 10605) to improve or expand existing farmers' markets, roadside stands, community-supported agriculture programs, and other direct producer-to-consumer market opportunities, and to develop or aid in the development of new farmers’ markets, etc. The farm bill authorized unspecified amounts of appropriations for FY2002 through FY2007 for this program.

It was continued by the 2008 farm bill.
