= Winsorized mean =

Statistical measure of central tendency

A winsorized mean is a winsorized statistical measure of central tendency, much like the mean and median, and even more similar to the truncated mean. It involves the calculation of the mean after winsorizing — replacing given parts of a probability distribution or sample at the high and low end with the most extreme remaining values, typically doing so for an equal amount of both extremes: often 10 to 25 percent of the ends are replaced. The winsorized mean can equivalently be expressed as a weighted average of the truncated mean and the quantiles at which it is limited, which corresponds to replacing parts with the corresponding quantiles.

== Advantages ==
The winsorized mean is a useful estimator because by retaining the outliers without taking them too literally, it is less sensitive to observations at the extremes than the straightforward mean, and will still generate a reasonable estimate of central tendency or mean for almost all statistical models. In this regard it is referred to as a robust estimator.

== Drawbacks ==
The winsorized mean uses more information from the distribution or sample than the median. However, unless the underlying distribution is symmetric, the winsorized mean of a sample is unlikely to produce an unbiased estimator for either the mean or the median.

== Example ==
For a sample of 10 numbers (from x_{(1)}, the smallest, to x_{(10)} the largest; order statistic notation) the 10% winsorized mean is

$$\frac{\overbrace{x_{(2)} + x_{(2)}} + x_{(3)} + x_{(4)} + x_{(5)} + x_{(6)} + x_{(7)} + x_{(8)} + \overbrace{x_{(9)} + x_{(9)}}}{10}. \,$$

The key is in the repetition of x_{(2)} and x_{(9)}: the extras substitute for the original values x_{(1)} and x_{(10)} which have been discarded and replaced.

This is equivalent to a weighted average of 0.1 times the 5th percentile (x_{(2)}), 0.8 times the 10% trimmed mean, and 0.1 times the 95th percentile (x_{(9)}).
