= History of navigation =

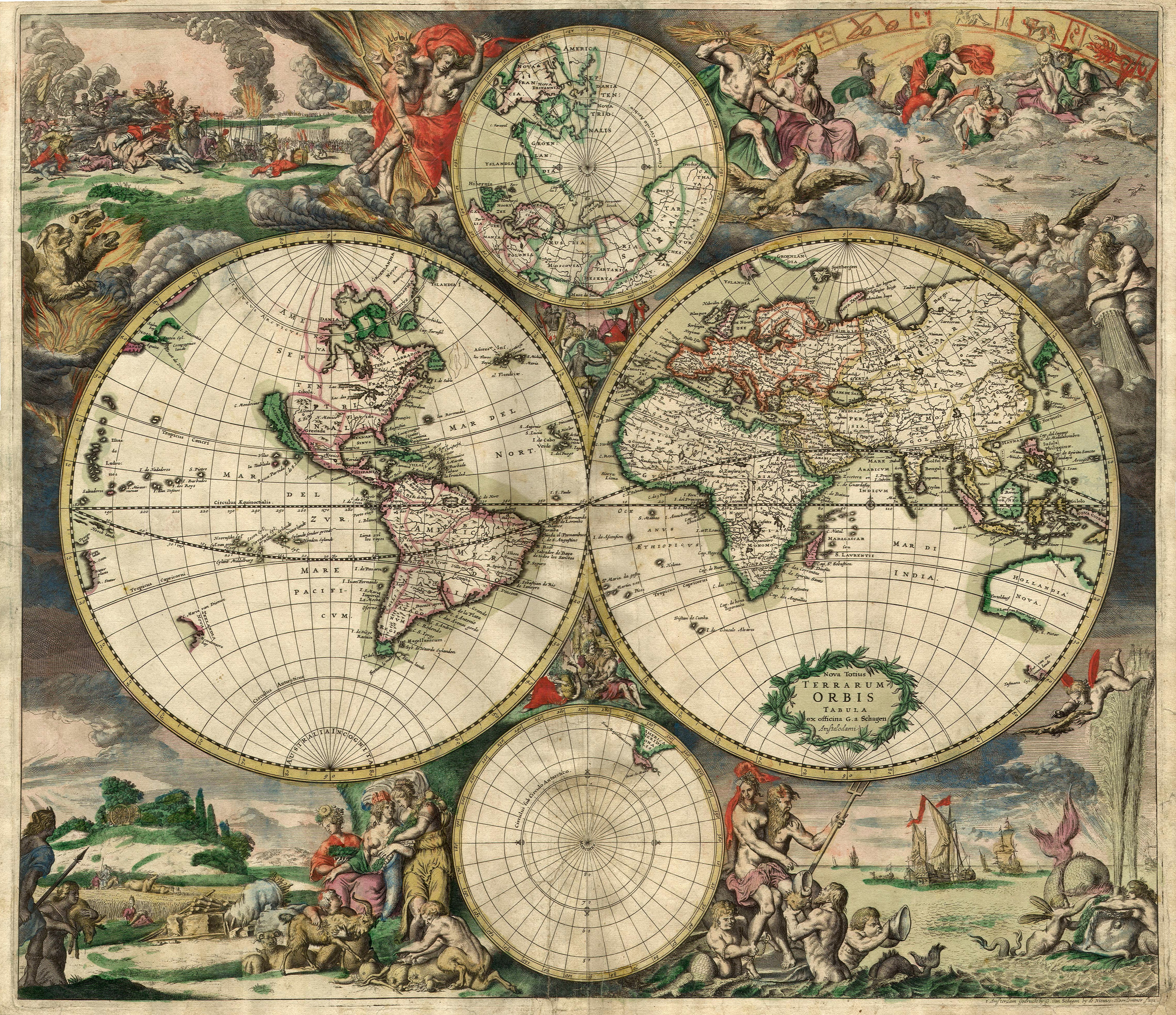
Map of the world produced in 1689 by Gerard van Schagen.

The history of navigation, or the history of seafaring, is the art of directing vessels upon the open sea through the establishment of its position and course by means of traditional practice, geometry, astronomy, or special instruments. Many peoples have excelled as seafarers, prominent among them the Austronesians (Islander Southeast Asians, Malagasy, Islander Melanesians, Micronesians, and Polynesians), the Harappans, the Phoenicians, the Iranians, the ancient Greeks, the Romans, the Arabs, the ancient Indians, the Norse, the Chinese, the Venetians, the Genoese, the Hanseatic Germans, the Portuguese, the Spanish, the English, the French, the Dutch, and the Danes.

== Antiquity ==
=== Indo-Pacific ===
Map showing the seaborne migration and expansion of the Austronesians beginning at around 3000 BC

Navigation in the Indo-Pacific began with the maritime migrations of the Austronesians from Taiwan who spread southwards into Island Southeast Asia and Island Melanesia during a period between 3000 and 1000 BC. Their first long-distance voyaging was the colonization of Micronesia from the Philippines at around 1500 BC. By about 900 BC their descendants had spread more than 6,000 kilometers across the Pacific, reaching Tonga and Samoa. In this region, a distinctive Polynesian culture developed. Within the next few centuries Polynesians reached Hawaii, New Zealand, Easter Island and possibly South America. Polynesian navigators used a range of tools and methods, including observation of birds, star navigation, and use of waves and swells to detect nearby land. Songs, mythological stories, and star charts were used to help people remember important navigational information. Meanwhile, Austronesians in Island Southeast Asia began the first true maritime trade networks by about 1000 BC, linking China, southern India, the Middle East, and coastal eastern Africa. Settlers from Borneo reached Madagascar by the early 1st millennium AD and colonized it by AD 500. (Note: The precise time of Austronesians reaching Madagascar is unknown, at the earliest is the earliest centuries BCE (Blench, “The Ethnographic Evidence for Long-distance Contacts”, p. 432.), the latest is no earlier than 7th century CE (Adelaar, “The Indonesian Migrations to Madagascar”, p. 15.).)

=== Mediterranean ===
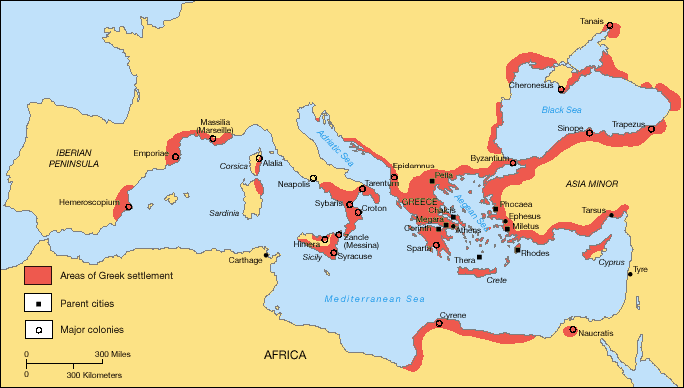
Greek territories and colonies during the Archaic period (800–480 BC)

Sailors navigating in the Mediterranean made use of several techniques to determine their location, including staying in sight of land and understanding the winds and their tendencies. Minoans of Crete are an example of an early Western civilization that used celestial navigation. Their palaces and mountaintop sanctuaries exhibit architectural features that align with the rising sun on the equinoxes, as well as the rising and setting of particular stars. The Minoans made sea voyages to the island of Thera and to Egypt. Both of these trips would have taken more than a day's sail for the Minoans and would have left them traveling by night across open water. Here the sailors would use the locations of particular stars, especially those of the constellation Ursa Major, to orient the ship in the correct direction.

Written records of navigation using stars, or celestial navigation, go back to Homer's Odyssey where Calypso tells Odysseus to keep the Bear (Ursa Major) on his left hand side and at the same time to observe the position of the Pleiades, the late-setting Boötes and the Orion as he sailed eastward from her island Ogygia traversing the Ocean. The Greek poet Aratus wrote in his Phainomena in the third century BC detailed positions of the constellations as written by Eudoxos. The positions described do not match the locations of the stars during Aratus' or Eudoxos' time for the Greek mainland, but some argue that they match the sky from Crete during the Bronze Age. This change in the position of the stars is due to the wobble of the Earth on its axis which affects primarily the pole stars. Around 1000 BC the constellation Draco would have been closer to the North Pole than Polaris. The pole stars were used to navigate because they did not disappear below the horizon and could be seen consistently throughout the night.

By the third century BC the Greeks had begun to use the Little Bear, Ursa Minor, to navigate. In the mid-1st century AD Lucan writes of Pompey who questions a sailor about the use of stars in navigation. The sailor replies with his description of the use of circumpolar stars to navigate by. To navigate along a degree of latitude a sailor would have needed to find a circumpolar star above that degree in the sky. For example, Apollonius would have used β Draconis to navigate as he traveled west from the mouth of the Alpheus River to Syracuse.

The voyage of the Greek navigator Pytheas of Massalia is a particularly notable example of a very long, early voyage. A competent astronomer and geographer, Pytheas ventured from Greece through the strait of Gibraltar to Western Europe and the British Isles. Pytheas is the first known person to describe the Midnight Sun, (Note: The theoretical existence of a Frigid Zone where the nights are very short in summer and the Sun does not set at the summer solstice was already known. Similarly reports of a country of perpetual snows and darkness (the country of the Hyperboreans) had been reaching the Mediterranean for some centuries. Pytheas is the first known scientific visitor and reporter of the arctic.) polar ice, Germanic tribes and possibly Stonehenge. Pytheas also introduced the idea of distant "Thule" to the geographic imagination and his account is the earliest to state that the Moon is the cause of the tides.

Nearchos's celebrated voyage from India to Susa after Alexander's expedition in India is preserved in Arrian's account, the Indica. Greek navigator Eudoxus of Cyzicus explored the Arabian Sea for Ptolemy VIII, king of the Hellenistic Ptolemaic dynasty in Egypt. According to Poseidonius, later reported in Strabo's Geography, the monsoon wind system of the Indian Ocean was first sailed by Eudoxus of Cyzicus in 118 or 116 BC.

Nautical charts and textual descriptions known as sailing directions have been in use in one form or another since the sixth century BC. Nautical charts using stereographic and orthographic projections date back to the second century BC.

==== Phoenicia and Carthage ====
Major Phoenician trade networks (c. 1200–800 BC)

The Phoenicians and their successors, the Carthaginians, were particularly adept sailors and learned to voyage further and further away from the coast in order to reach destinations faster. One tool that helped them was the sounding weight. This tool was bell shaped, made from stone or lead, with tallow inside attached to a very long rope. When out to sea, sailors could lower the sounding weight in order to determine how deep the waters were, and therefore estimate how far they were from land. Also, the tallow picked up sediments from the bottom which expert sailors could examine to determine exactly where they were. The Carthaginian Hanno the Navigator is known to have sailed through the Strait of Gibraltar c. 500 BC and explored the Atlantic coast of Africa. There is general consensus that the expedition reached at least as far as Senegal. There is a lack of agreement whether the furthest limit of Hanno's explorations was Mount Cameroon or Guinea's 890-metre (2910-foot) Mount Kakulima. Nonetheless, Hanno's maritime travels limit may have been further north, as there are well documented difficulties with the return travel from the regions south of cape Chaunar, which, up to the early 15th century, "had hitherto been the non plus ultra or impassable limit of European navigation"

=== Asia ===
In the South China Sea and Indian Ocean, a navigator could take advantage of the fairly constant monsoon winds to judge direction. This made long one-way voyages possible twice a year. A 260 CE book by K'ang T'ai (康泰) described ships with seven sails called po were used by the Indo-Scythian (月支—Yuezhi) traders for transporting horses. He also made reference to monsoon trade between the islands (or archipelago), which took a month and a few days in a large po. About 1000 BC, Nusantaran Austronesian developed tanja sail and junk sail. The invention of these types of sail made sailing around the western coast of Africa possible, because of their ability to sail against the wind. Ca. 200 AD in Han dynasty, Chuan (junk ships) are developed in China. (Note: Chinese vessels during this era were essentially fluvial (riverine), they did not build true ocean-going fleets until the 10th century Song dynasty. A UNESCO study argues that the Chinese were using square sails during the Han dynasty; only in the 12th century did the Chinese adopt the Austronesian junk sail.) In ca. 50–500 AD Malay and Javanese trading fleets reached Madagascar. Also brought with them was the Ma'anyan dayak people, as labourers and slaves. The Malagasy language originated from Southeast Barito language, and Ma'anyan language is its closest relative, with numerous Malay and Javanese loanwords. By the 8th or 9th century A.D., ancient Indonesian ships may have already reached as far as Ghana, likely using the outrigger Borobudur ship and the K'un-lun po or jong.

== Medieval age of navigation ==
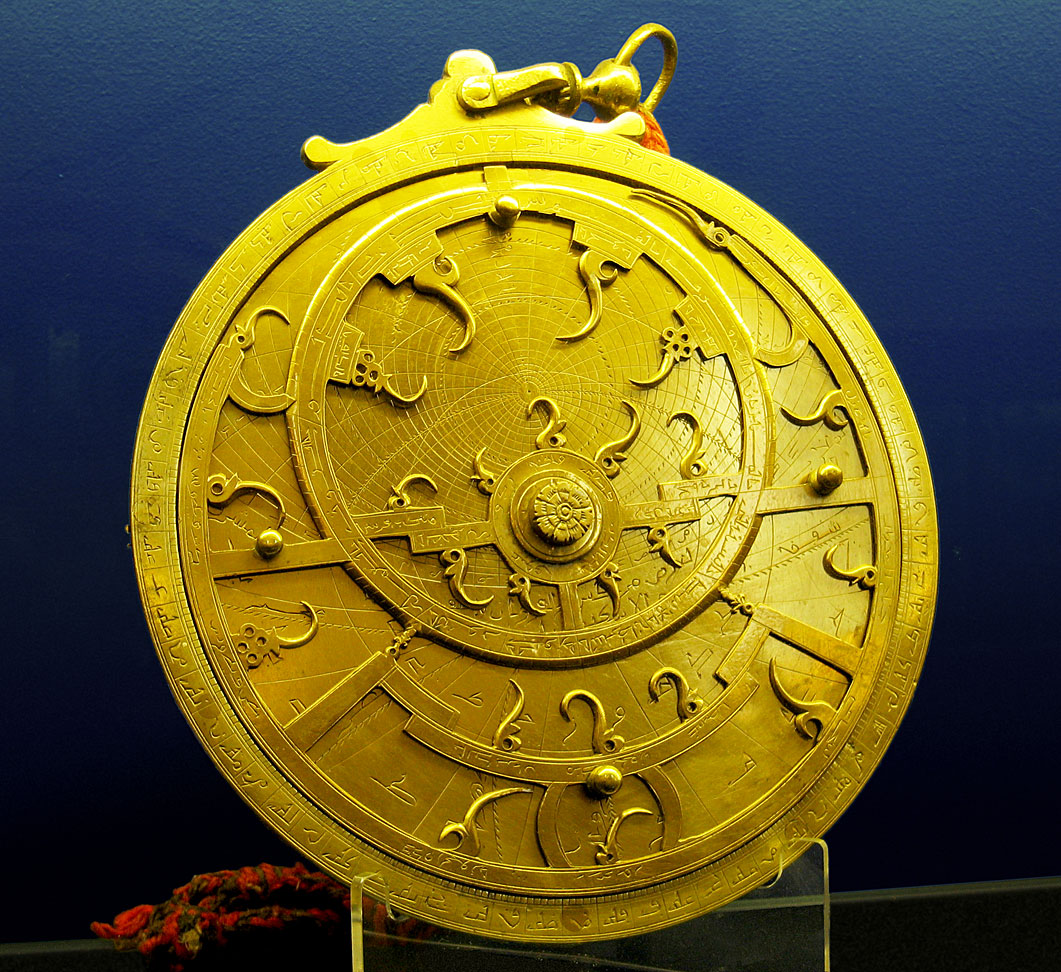
An 18th-century Persian Astrolabe, kept at The Whipple Museum of the History of Science in Cambridge, England.

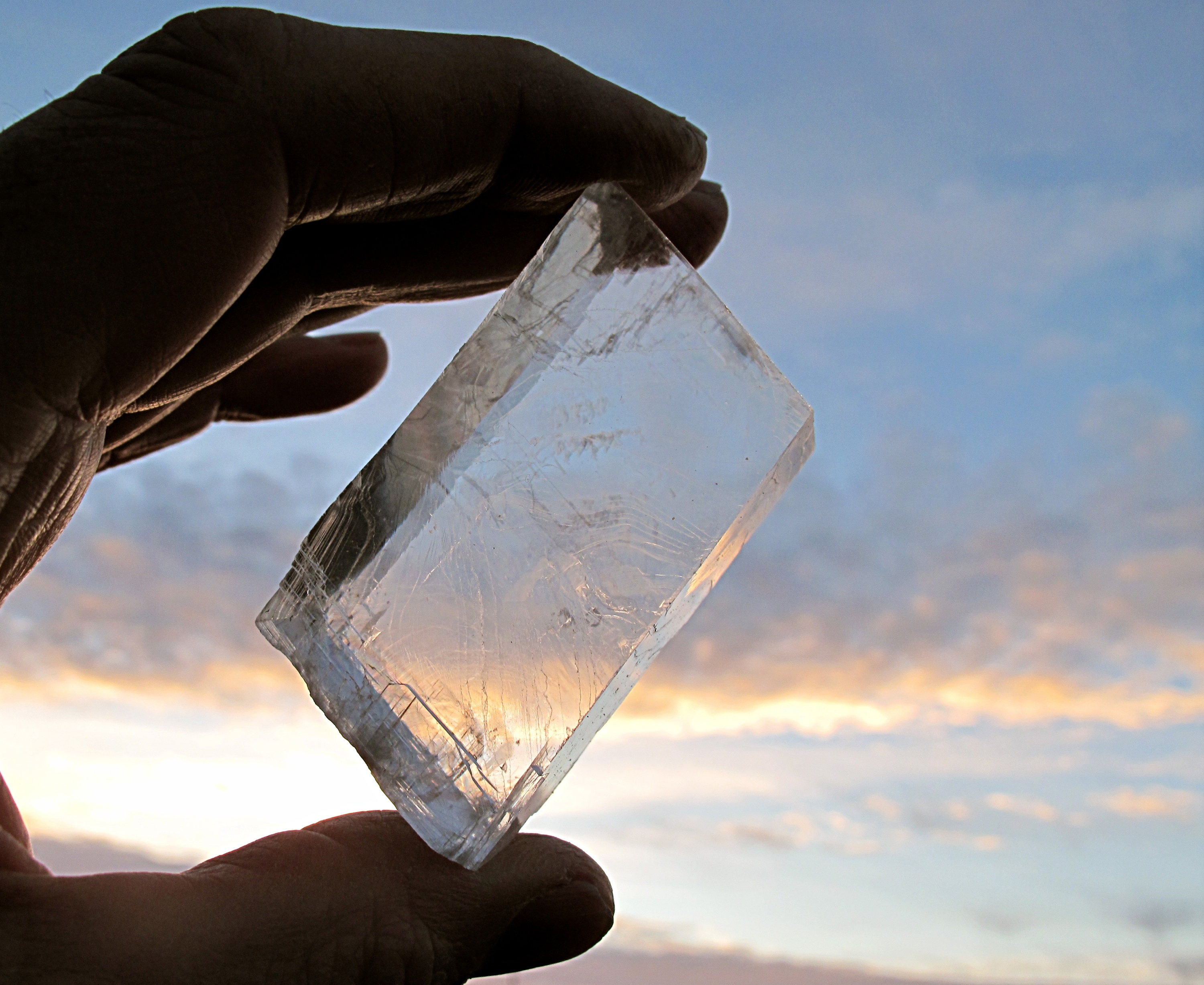
Iceland spar, possibly the Icelandic medieval sunstone used to locate the sun in the sky when obstructed from view.

The Arab Empire significantly contributed to navigation, and had trade networks extending from the Atlantic Ocean and Mediterranean Sea in the west to the Indian Ocean and China Sea in the east, Apart from the Nile, Tigris and Euphrates, navigable rivers in the Islamic regions were uncommon, so transport by sea was very important. Islamic geography and navigational sciences made use of a magnetic compass and a rudimentary instrument known as a kamal, used for celestial navigation and for measuring the altitudes and latitudes of the stars. The kamal itself was simple to construct. It was a rectangular piece of either bone or wood which had a string with 9 consecutive knots attached to it. Another instrument available, developed by the Arabs as well, was the quadrant. Also a celestial navigation device, it was originally developed for astronomy and later transitioned to navigation. When combined with detailed maps of the period, sailors were able to sail across oceans rather than skirt along the coast. However, there are no records of open ocean Atlantic sailing, and their activity focused on Mediterranean, Red Sea, Persian Gulf, Arabian Sea and across to the Bay of Bengal. The origins of the caravel ship, developed and used for long-distance travel by the Portuguese, and later by the rest of Iberians, since the 15th century, also date back to the qarib used by Andalusian explorers by the 13th century.

The sea lanes between India and neighboring lands were the usual form of trade for many centuries, and are responsible for the widespread influence of Indian culture to the societies of Southeast Asia. Powerful navies included those of the Maurya, Satavahana, Chola, Vijayanagara, Kalinga, Maratha and Mughal Empire.

Vikings used polarization and the Sunstone to allow navigation of their ships by locating the Sun even in a completely overcast sky. This special mineral was talked about in several 13th–14th-century written sources in Iceland, some centuries after the carbon-dated, early-11th-century Norse settlement of L'Anse aux Meadows in northernmost Newfoundland had been briefly established.

In China between 1040 and 1117, the magnetic compass was being developed and applied to navigation. This let masters continue sailing a course when the weather limited visibility of the sky. The true mariner's compass using a pivoting needle in a dry box was invented in Europe no later than 1300.

Nautical charts called portolan charts began to appear in Italy at the end of the 13th century. However, their use did not seem to spread quickly: there are no reports of the use of a nautical chart on an English vessel until 1489.

== Age of exploration ==
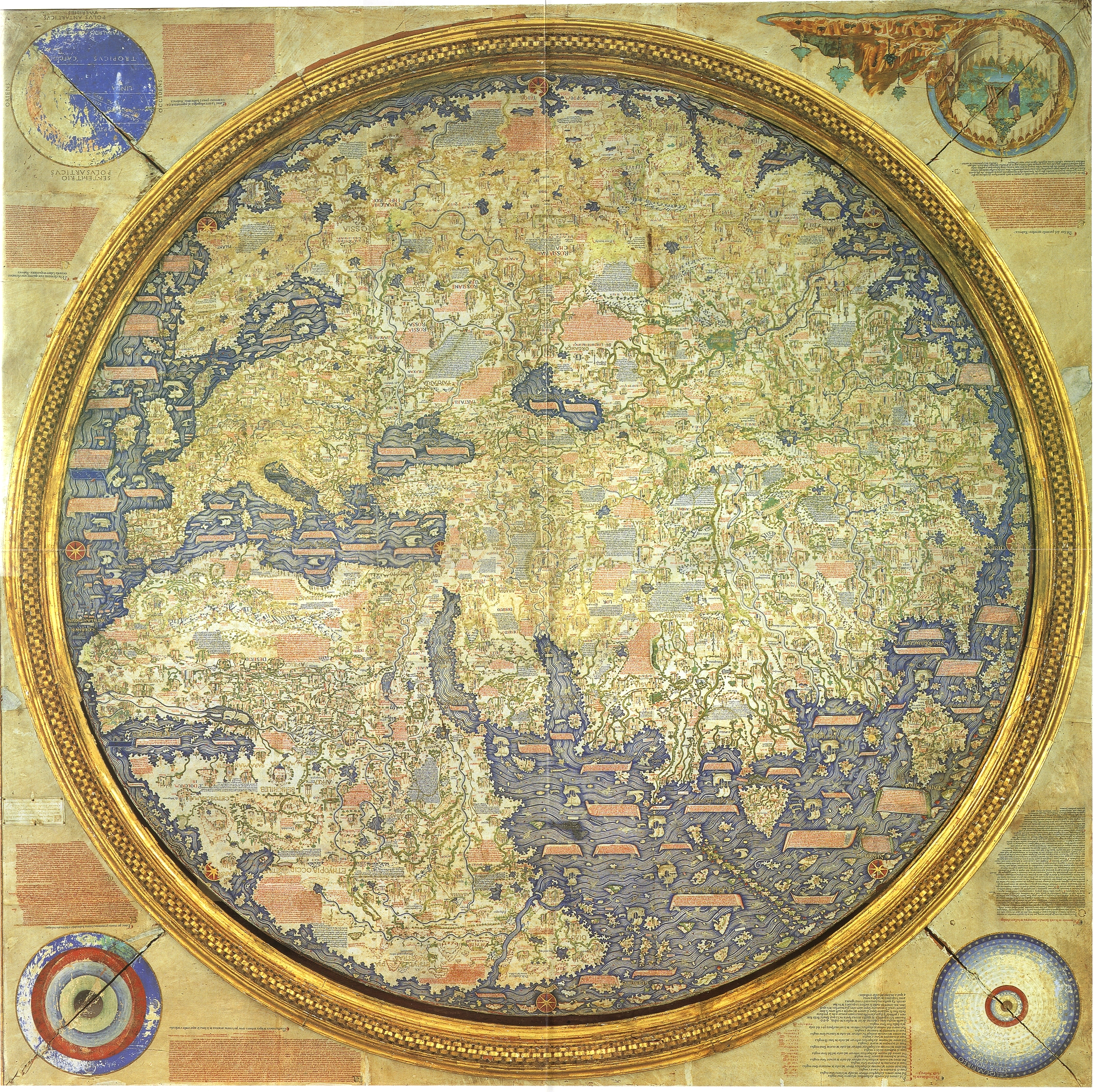
The Fra Mauro map, "considered the greatest memorial of medieval cartography" according to Roberto Almagià is a map made between 1457 and 1459 by the Venetian monk Fra Mauro. It is a circular planisphere drawn on parchment and set in a wooden frame, about two meters in diameter.

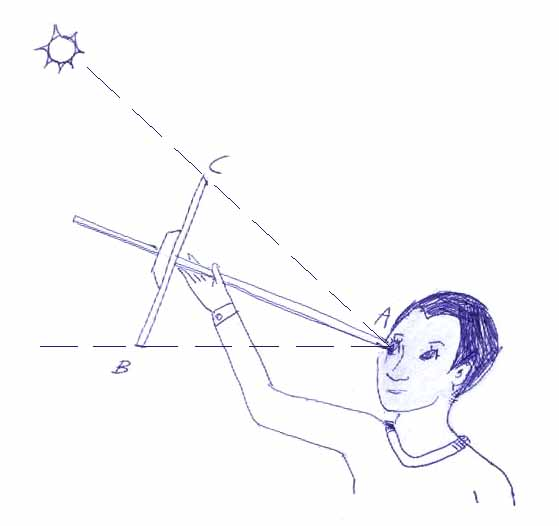
The cross-staff was an ancient precursor to the modern marine sextant.

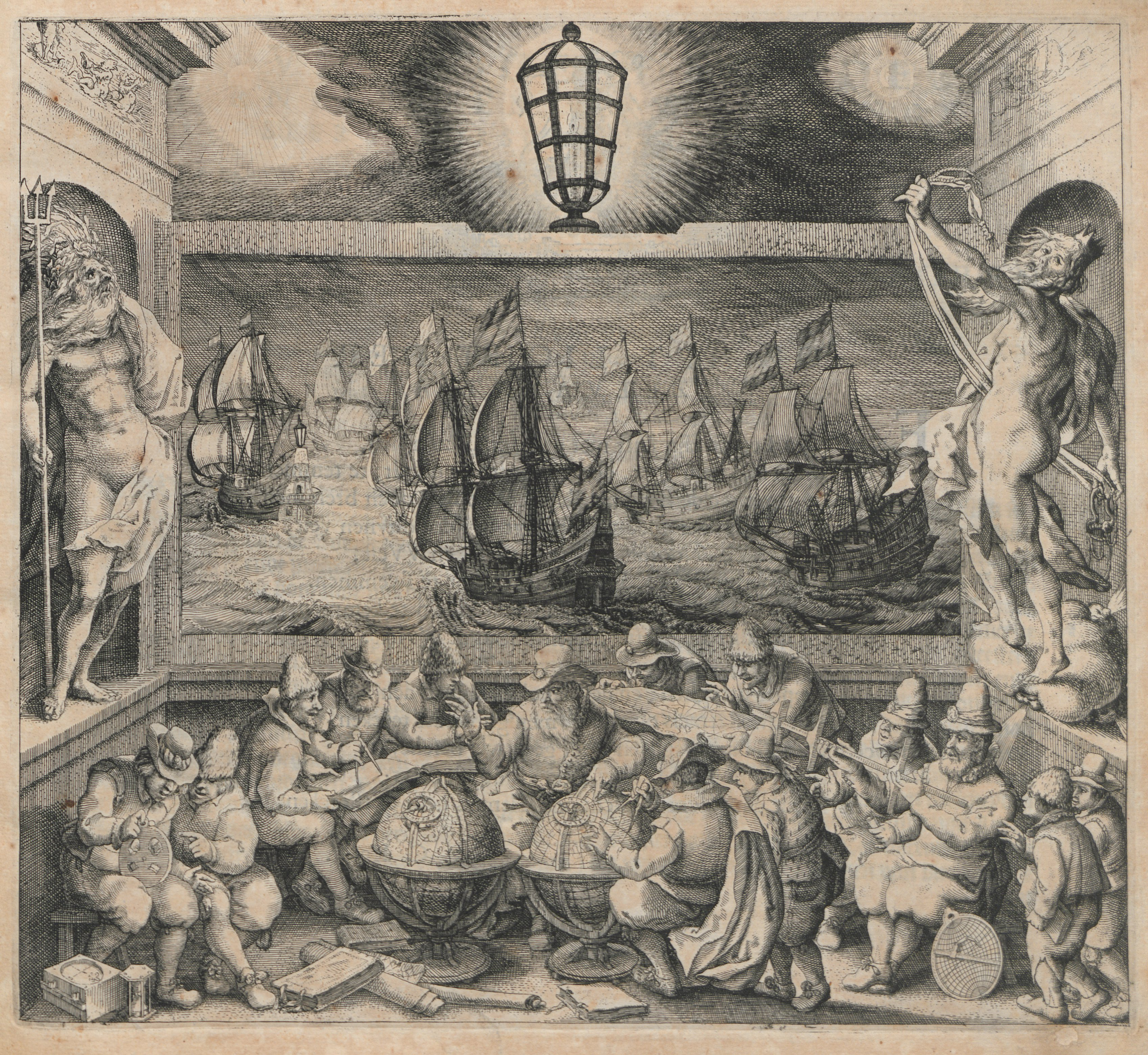
"The light of navigation", Dutch sailing handbook, 1608, showing compass, hourglass, sea astrolabe, terrestrial and celestial globes, divider, Jacob's staff and astrolabe.

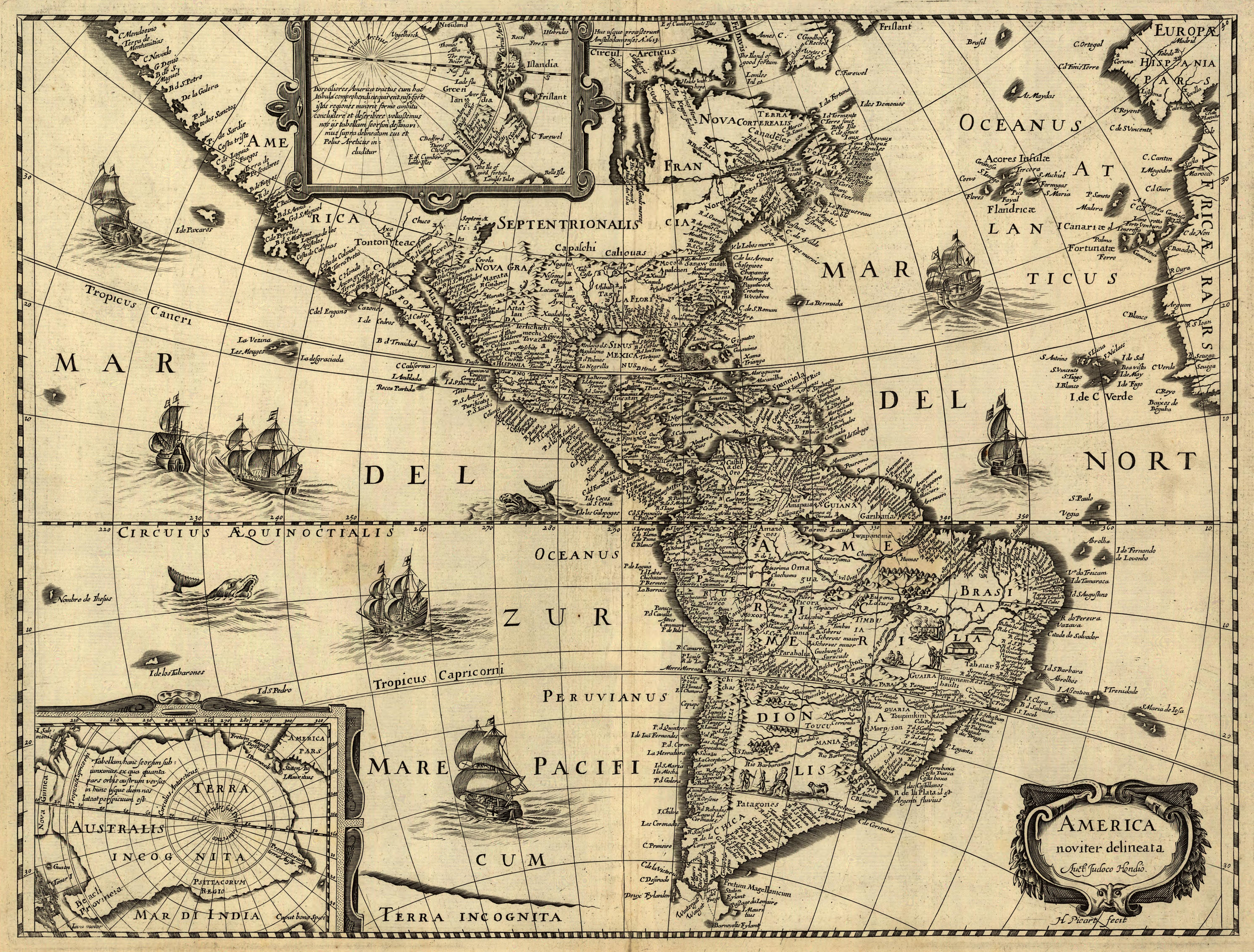
Fairly accurate maps of the Americas were being drawn in the early 17th century.

The commercial activities of Portugal in the early 15th century marked an epoch of distinct progress in practical navigation for Europeans. These exploration and trade expeditions sent out by Infante Henrique (later called "Henry the Navigator") led first to the discovery of Porto Santo Island (near Madeira) in 1418, rediscovery of the Azores in 1427, the discovery of the Cape Verde Islands in 1447 and Sierra Leone in 1462.

Combined with the empirical observations gathered in oceanic seafaring, mapping winds and currents, Portuguese explorers took the lead in the long distance oceanic navigation, opening later, at the beginning of the 16th century, a network of ocean routes covering the Atlantic, the Indian and the western Pacific oceans, from the North Atlantic and South America, to Japan and Southeast Asia.

The Portuguese campaign of Atlantic navigation is one of the earliest examples of a systematic scientific large project, sustained over many decades. This program of study recruited several men of exceptional ability, had a well-defined set of objectives, and was open to experimental confirmation through the success or otherwise of subsequent navigations.

=== Initial Period – Portuguese exploration of the Atlantic: Duarte Pacheco Pereira ===
The main problem in navigating, by sail alone, back from the south of the Canary Islands (or south of Boujdour), is due to the change in the regime of winds and currents: the North Atlantic gyre and the Equatorial counter current will push south along the northwest bulge of Africa, while the uncertain winds where the Northeast trades meet the Southeast trades (the doldrums) leave a sailing ship to the mercy of the currents. Together, prevalent current and wind make northwards progress very difficult or impossible. In this context, the Portuguese discovered the two large volta do mar (meaning literally turn of the sea but also return from the sea) currents and trade winds of North and of South Atlantic Ocean (approximately in the first half and in the late 15th century respectively), that paved the way to reach the New World and return to Europe, as well as to circumnavigate Africa in western open sea, in future voyages of discovery, avoiding contrary winds and currents. The 'rediscovery' of the Azores islands in 1427 is merely a reflection of the heightened strategic importance of the islands, now sitting on the return route from the western coast of Africa (sequentially called 'volta de Guiné' and 'volta da Mina'); and the references to the Sargasso Sea (also called at the time 'Mar da Baga'), to the west of the Azores, in 1436, reveals the western extent of the return route. To resolve the difficulties involved in the return trip, a systematic exploration of the coasts and open sea conditions was undertaken, lasting until the final years of the 15th century. An early example of such systematic criteria is found in Duarte Pacheco Pereira, navigator, military commander and learned writer of ‘Esmeraldo de Situ Orbis’ (1505–1508), where he reports his and other's exploration of the African coast and of the open seas of the south Atlantic:

In the 'Esmeraldo's introduction:

"what belongs to cosmography and seamanship I hope to spell out (…) ...how does a headland or place lay in respect of another; and this so that this work takes order and grounding; and the coast may be more safely navigated; and likewise the knowledge of the lands and where lay the shallows which for this it is much necessary to know; also of the sounders performed in some places what their depth is and also the different of the bottoms, if they are mudd or sand, or stone, or pebbles, or sharp edges, or shells (burgao = Livona pica) or what quality is such sounding; and being known what is the distance from the shallows to the coastline; and likewise the tides, if they are from northeast and southwest like those from our spain, or is they are from north and south, or west and east, or northwest and southeast, which for the purpose of entering and exiting ports and river-mouths are absolutely necessary; and also de measurements from the poles from which can be known how many degrees are the places apart and the latitude relative to the equator; and also the nature of the people of this ethiopia (Africa) and their mode of life and I will also talk about the commerce that could be had in this land

The repositories for the observations made were the 'Roteiros' or maritime route-maps. The earliest Roteiro known is part of a collection of several manuscripts by Valentim Fernandes (1485) with the coast up to the delta of the Niger river in present-day Nigeria, followed by the 'Esmeraldo...' (1505–08) cited above; several 'roteiros' included in the 'Livro de Marinharia e Tratado da Agulha de Marear' (Treatise of Seamanship and of the magnetic needle) by João de Lisboa (1514); roteiros included in the 'Regimento de Navegacão...' (Regiment of Navigation) by André Pires (1520); roteiros for Brazil by Pero Lopes de Sousa (1530–32), Roteiro da Carreira da Índia' (Route-book of the travel to/from India) by Diogo de Afonso (1536); and the roteiros by D. João de Castro (see below): Lisbon to Goa (1538), Goa to Diu (northwest India) (1538–39, and the Red Sea (1541)

The extent of the explorations undertaken is again reported in the 'Esmeraldo...', on the 2nd page of the 2nd chapter:

"… Year of our Lord of 1498 where Your Highness commanded us to explore the western area going past the greatness of the ocean sea; where is found and explored a very large firm land with many and large adjoining islands, which extends from seventy degrees of latitude from the equator line towards the arctic pole (…) and goes further of twenty eight degrees of latitude from the equator line towards the antarctic pole (…) from any place in Europe or Africa and going across all the ocean in a straight line to the west by the rules of seamanship for thirty six degrees of longitude, which are six hundred and forty eight leagues of route counting at eighteen leagues per degree."

It is unlikely that the exploration of the open seas of the southern Atlantic was made in a single voyage, particularly when the route taken by Vasco da Gama in 1497 was significantly different from the one taken by Pedro Álvares Cabral in 1500, each being adapted to the season of departure. This adaptation shows an understanding of the cycle of yearly variations in winds and currents in the southern Atlantic. Furthermore, there were systematic expeditions pushing into the western Northern Atlantic (Teive, 1454; Vogado, 1462; Teles, 1474; Ulmo, 1486) The documents relating to the supplying of ships, and the ordering of sun declination tables for the southern Atlantic for as early as 1493–1496, all suggest a well planned and systematic activity. The most significant consequence of this systematised knowledge was the negotiation of the Treaty of Tordesillas in 1494, moving the line of demarcation 270 leagues to the west (from 100 to 370 leagues west of the Azores) with the consequence of affirming the Portuguese claim to Brazil and its dominance of the Atlantic.

=== Mature Period – Portuguese exploration of the Indic: João de Castro ===
By the early 16th century there were regular voyages between Lisbon and the Indic. The knowledge of the Atlantic developed by accretion, with the systematic exploration moving into the Indic. The corollary of this activity involved a group of remarkable men established around the academic (mathematician, cosmographer) Pedro Nunes, and the explorer and ‘lead investigator’ João de Castro (navigator, military commander and Vice-Roy of India); such men included Andre de Resende (scholar), João de Barros (chronist and scholar), and possibly Damião de Gois (a diplomat, scholar and friend of Erasmus). The theoretical works of Pedro Nunes (1502–1578) achieved the mathematical determination of the loxodromic curve: the shortest course between two points on the surface of a sphere represented onto a two-dimensional map, clearing the way for the establishment of the Mercator projection. It is Pedro Nunes who states, in his contemporaneous "Treatise of the Sphere" (1537), that Portuguese navigations were not an adventurous endeavour:

"nam se fezeram indo a acertar: mas partiam os nossos mareantes muy ensinados e prouidos de estromentos e regras de astrologia e geometria que sam as cousas que os cosmographos ham dadar apercebidas (...) e leuaua cartas muy particularmente rumadas e na ja as de que os antigos vsauam" (were not done by chance: but our seafarers departed well taught and provided with instruments and rules of astrology (astronomy) and geometry which were matters the cosmographers would provide (...) and they took charts with exact routes and no longer those used by the ancient).

Nunes credibility rests on being personally involved in the instruction of pilots and senior seafarers from 1527 onwards. Moreover, it was Nunes who developed instruments and instructions for the systematic work of João de Castro, as stated by Castro in several of his letters.

João de Castro's work took place along the route of the Indian Ocean (1538), particularly the Arabian Sea with the Persian Gulf and the Red Sea (1538–39 and 1541). While his study of the coast, navigation and winds and currents is rigorous and accurate, it is his research on terrestrial magnetism in the Atlantic and Indian oceans that came to be celebrated:

"D. Joao de Castro carried out a series of experiments that succeeded in detecting phenomena, in particular related to magnetism and the magnetic needle on board. It should be assumed that such knowledge to Pedro Nunes, of course the direct inspiration of all the observations he has done in his travels. When on August 5, 1538, D. João de Castro decided to determine the latitude of Mozambique, found the cause that dictated the astonishing uneasiness of needles; noted the deviation of the needle, discovering it 128 years before Dennis Guillaume (1666) of Nieppe, which is recorded in History of Sailing as if he were the first to know about this phenomenon. His point near Baçaim, on December 22, 1538, a magnetic phenomenon, for which there were variations of the needle because of the proximity of certain rocks, confirmed four centuries later, was called local attraction. D. João de Castro refuted the theory that the variation of magnetic declination is not formed by geographic meridians. His comments are the most important record of values of magnetic declination in the Atlantic and Indian oceans, in the sixteenth century, and useful for the study of terrestrial magnetism. It was one of the personalities of this century European experimental science, linking the importance of this study with the sailing."

King John II of Portugal continued this effort, forming a committee on navigation. This group computed tables of the sun's declination and improved the mariner's astrolabe, believing it a good replacement for the cross-staff. These resources improved the ability of a navigator at sea to judge his latitude. Castilian Jew Abraham Zacut, the author of an exceptional treatise on astronomy/astrology in Hebrew, with the title Ha-jibbur Ha-gadol, fled to Portugal in 1492. He published in the printing press of Leiria in 1496, the book Biur Luhoth, or in Latin Almanach Perpetuum, which was soon translated into Latin and Spanish. In this book were the astronomical tables (ephemerides) for the years 1497 to 1500, which may have been instrumental, together with the new astrolabe, made of metal and not wood as before (created and perfected at the beginning of the Portuguese discoveries), to Vasco da Gama and Pedro Álvares Cabral in their voyages to India (also passing through South America) around the open Atlantic Ocean (including the Southwest Atlantic) and in the Indian Ocean. Nevertheless, the Portuguese had to hire local pilots in the Indian Ocean for several decades to guide their ships.

In the 15th and 16th centuries, the Crown of Castile and then the "unified" Crown of Spain was also in the vanguard of European global exploration and colonial expansion. The Spanish Crown opened trade routes across the oceans, specially the transatlantic expeditions of Christopher Columbus on behalf of Castile, from 1492. The Crown of Castile, under Charles I of Spain, also sponsored the first expedition of world circumnavigation in 1521. The enterprise was led by Portuguese navigator Ferdinand Magellan and completed by the Spanish navigator Juan Sebastián Elcano after the former's death in the Philippines in 1521. The fleet of seven ships sailed from Sanlúcar de Barrameda in Southern Spain in 1519, crossed the Atlantic Ocean and after several stopovers rounded the southern tip of South America. Some ships were lost, but the remaining fleet continued across the Pacific making a number of discoveries including Guam and the Philippines. By then, only two galleons were left from the original seven. The Victoria led by Elcano sailed across the Indian Ocean and north along the coast of Africa, to finally arrive in Spain in 1522, three years after its departure. The Trinidad sailed east from the Philippines, trying to find a maritime path back to the Americas, but was unsuccessful. The eastward route across the Pacific, also known as the tornaviaje (return trip) was only discovered forty years later, when Spanish cosmographer Andrés de Urdaneta sailed from the Philippines, north to parallel 39°, and hit the eastward Kuroshio Current which took its galleon across the Pacific. He arrived in Acapulco on October 8, 1565, The trips of exploration led to trade flourishing across the Atlantic Ocean between Spain and America and across the Pacific Ocean between Asia-Pacific and Mexico via the Philippines. Later, Andrés de Urdaneta discovered the northern Pacific's volta do mar return voyage.

The compass, a cross-staff or astrolabe, a method to correct for the altitude of Polaris and rudimentary nautical charts were all the tools available to a navigator at the time of Christopher Columbus. In his notes on Ptolemy's geography, Johannes Werner of Nuremberg wrote in 1514 that the cross-staff was a very ancient instrument, but was only beginning to be used on ships.

Prior to 1577, no method of judging the ship's speed was mentioned that was more advanced than observing the size of the vessel's bow wave or the passage of sea foam or various floating objects. In 1577, a more advanced technique was mentioned: the chip log. In 1578, a patent was registered for a device that would judge the ship's speed by counting the revolutions of a wheel mounted below the ship's waterline.

Accurate time-keeping is necessary for the determination of longitude. As early as 1530, precursors to modern techniques were being explored. However, the most accurate clocks available to these early navigators were water clocks and sand clocks, such as hourglass. Hourglasses were still in use by the Royal Navy of Britain until 1839 for the timing of watches.

Continuous accumulation of navigational data, along with increased exploration and trade, led to increased production of volumes through the Middle Ages. "Routiers" were produced in France about 1500; the English referred to them as "rutters." In 1584 Lucas Waghenaer published the Spieghel der Zeevaerdt (The Mariner's Mirror), which became the model for such publications for several generations of navigators. They were known as "Waggoners" by most sailors.

In 1537, Pedro Nunes published his Tratado da Sphera. In this book he included two original treatises about questions of navigation. For the first time the subject was approached using mathematical tools. This publication gave rise to a new scientific discipline: "theoretical or scientific navigation".

In 1545, Pedro de Medina published the influential Arte de navegar. The book was translated into French, Italian, Dutch and English.

In 1569, Gerardus Mercator published for the first time a world map in such a cartographic projection that constant-rhumb trajectories were plotted as straight lines. This Mercator projection would be widely used for nautical charts from the 18th century onward.

In 1594, John Davis published an 80-page pamphlet called The Seaman's Secrets which, among other things describes great circle sailing. It's said that the explorer Sebastian Cabot had used great circle methods in a crossing of the North Atlantic in 1495. Davis also gave the world a version of the backstaff, the Davis quadrant, which became one of the dominant instruments from the 17th century until the adoption of the sextant in the 19th century.

In 1599, Edward Wright published Certaine Errors in Navigation, which translated the work of Pedro Nunes explaining the mathematical basis of the Mercator projection, with calculated mathematical tables which made it possible to use in practice. The book made clear why only with this projection would a constant bearing correspond to a straight line on a chart. It also analysed other sources of error, including the risk of parallax errors with some instruments; and faulty estimates of latitude and longitude on contemporary charts.

In 1599–1600, Edward Wright's World Chart of 1599 was the first map under the Mercator projection drawn by an Englishman for English navigation. The map prominently displays the Queen Elizabeth I Privy Seal; the only one of her realm to carry her private seal. The Molyneux 1592 globe is the only other cartography with her Privy Seal. Both identify Nova Albion, the land Captain Francis Drake claimed for his Queen during his 1577–1580 circumnavigation, above the 40th parallel.

In 1631, Pierre Vernier described his newly invented quadrant that was accurate to one minute of arc. In theory, this level of accuracy could give a line of position within a nautical mile of the navigator's actual position.

In 1635, Henry Gellibrand published an account of yearly change in magnetic variation.

In 1637, using a specially built astronomical sextant with a 5-foot radius, Richard Norwood measured the length of a nautical mile with chains. His definition of 2,040 yards is fairly close to the modern International System of Units (SI) definition of 2,025.372 yards. Norwood is also credited with the discovery of magnetic dip 59 years earlier, in 1576.

== Modern times ==
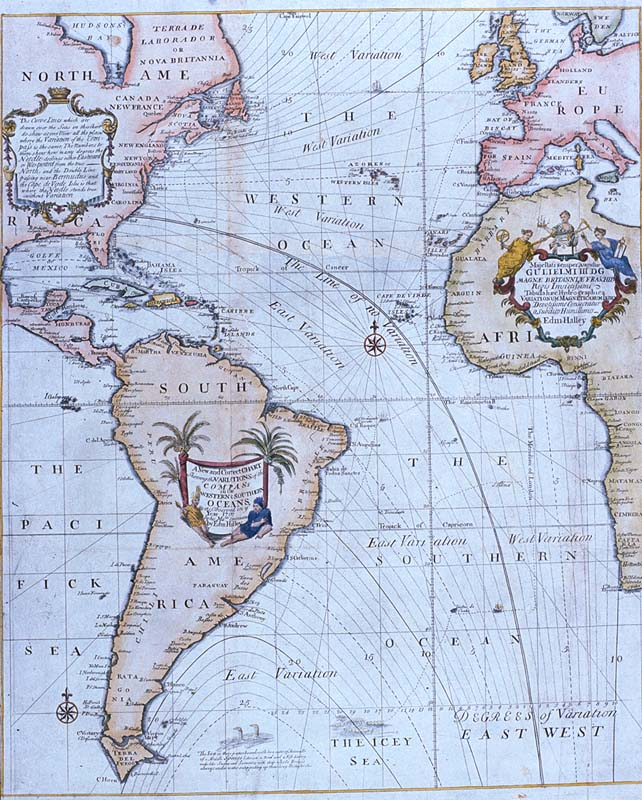
Edmond Halley's 1701 map charting magnetic variation from true north

In 1714 the British Commissioners for the discovery of longitude at sea came into prominence. This group, which existed until 1828, offered grants and rewards for the solution of navigational problems. Between 1737 and 1828, the commissioners disbursed some £101,000. The government of the United Kingdom also offered significant rewards for navigational accomplishments in this era, such as £20,000 for the discovery of the Northwest Passage and £5,000 for the navigator that could sail within a degree of latitude of the North Pole. A widespread manual in the 18th century was Navigatio Britannica by John Barrow, published in 1750 by March & Page and still being advertised in 1787.

Isaac Newton invented a reflecting quadrant around 1699. He wrote a detailed description of the instrument for Edmond Halley, which was published in 1742. Due to this time lapse, credit for the invention has often been given instead to John Hadley and Thomas Godfrey. The octant eventually replaced earlier cross-staffs and Davis quadrants, and had the immediate effect of making latitude calculations much more accurate.

A highly important breakthrough for the accurate determination of longitude came with the invention of the marine chronometer. The 1714 longitude prize offer for a method of determining longitude at sea, was won by John Harrison, a Yorkshire carpenter. He submitted a project in 1730, and in 1735 completed a clock based on a pair of counter-oscillating weighted beams connected by springs whose motion was not influenced by gravity or the motion of a ship. His first two sea timepieces H1 and H2 (completed in 1741) used this system, but he realised that they had a fundamental sensitivity to centrifugal force, which meant that they could never be accurate enough at sea. Harrison solved the precision problems with his much smaller H4 chronometer design in 1761. H4 looked much like a large five-inch (12 cm) diameter pocket watch. In 1761, Harrison submitted H4 for the £20,000 longitude prize. His design used a fast-beating balance wheel controlled by a temperature-compensated spiral spring. These features remained in use until stable electronic oscillators allowed very accurate portable timepieces to be made at affordable cost. In 1767, the Board of Longitude published a description of his work in The Principles of Mr. Harrison's time-keeper.

In 1757, John Bird invented the first sextant. This replaced the Davis quadrant and the octant as the main instrument for navigation. The sextant was derived from the octant in order to provide for the lunar distance method. With the lunar distance method, mariners could determine their longitude accurately. Once chronometer production was established in the late 18th century, the use of the chronometer for accurate determination of longitude was a viable alternative. Chronometers replaced lunars in wide usage by the late 19th century.

In 1891 radios, in the form of wireless telegraphs, began to appear on ships at sea.

In 1899 the R.F. Matthews was the first ship to use wireless communication to request assistance at sea. Using radio for determining direction was investigated by "Sir Oliver Lodge, of England; Andre Blondel, of France; De Forest, Pickard; and Stone, of the United States; and Bellini and Tosi, of Italy." The Stone Radio & Telegraph Company installed an early prototype radio direction finder on the naval collier Lebanon in 1906.

By 1904 time signals were being sent to ships to allow navigators to check their chronometers. The U.S. Navy Hydrographic Office was sending navigational warnings to ships at sea by 1907.

Later developments included the placing of lighthouses and buoys close to shore to act as marine signposts identifying ambiguous features, highlighting hazards and pointing to safe channels for ships approaching some part of a coast after a long sea voyage. In 1912 Nils Gustaf Dalén was awarded the Nobel Prize in Physics for his invention of automatic valves designed to be used in combination with gas accumulators in lighthouses.

1921 saw the installation of the first radiobeacon.

The first prototype shipborne radar system was installed on the USS Leary in April 1937.

On November 18, 1940, Mr. Alfred L. Loomis made the initial suggestion for an electronic air navigation system which was later developed into LORAN (long range navigation system) by the Radiation Laboratory of the Massachusetts Institute of Technology, and on November 1, 1942, the first LORAN System was placed in operation with four stations between the Chesapeake Capes and Nova Scotia.

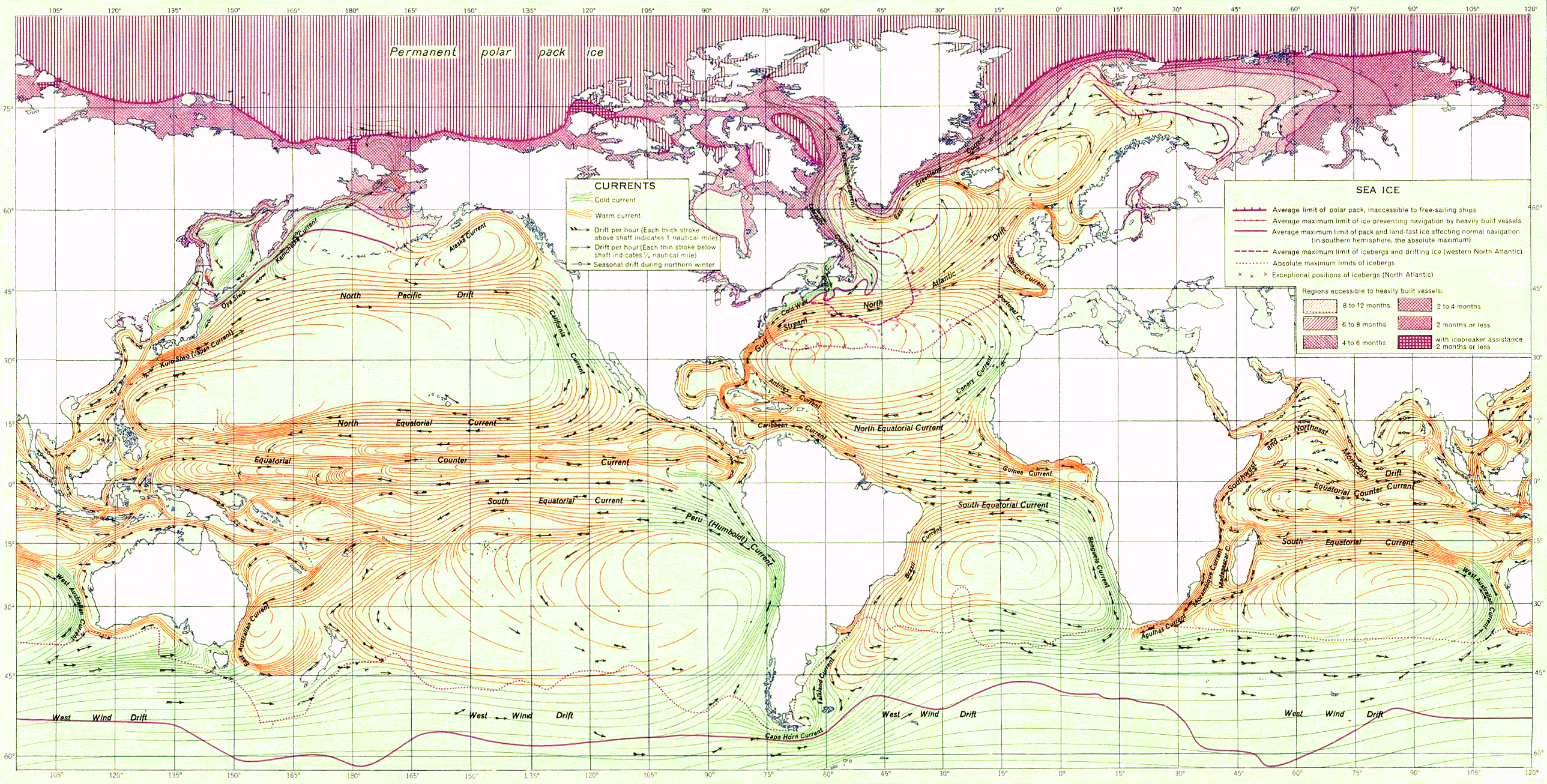
A 1943 United States military map of world ocean currents and ice packs, as they were known at the time.

In October 1957, the Soviet Union launched the world's first artificial satellite, Sputnik. Scientists at Johns Hopkins University's Applied Physics Laboratory took a series of measurements of Sputnik's doppler shift yielding the satellite's position and velocity. This team continued to monitor Sputnik and the next satellites into space, Sputnik II and Explorer I. In March 1958 the idea of working backwards, using known satellite orbits to determine an unknown position on the Earth's surface began to be explored. This led to the TRANSIT satellite navigation system. The first TRANSIT satellite was placed in polar orbit in 1960. The system, consisting of 7 satellites, was made operational in 1962. A navigator using readings from three satellites could expect accuracy of about 80 feet.

On July 14, 1974 the first prototype Navstar GPS satellite was put into orbit, but its clocks failed shortly after launch. The Navigational Technology Satellite 2, redesigned with cesium clocks, started to go into orbit on June 23, 1977. By 1985, the first 11-satellite GPS Block I constellation was in orbit.

Satellites of the similar Russian GLONASS system began to be put into orbit in 1982, and the system is expected to have a complete 24-satellite constellation in place by 2010. The European Space Agency expects to have its Galileo with 30 satellites in place by 2011–12 as well.

== Integrated bridge systems ==
Electronic integrated bridge concepts are driving future navigation system planning. Integrated systems take inputs from various ship sensors, electronically display positioning information, and provide control signals required to maintain a vessel on a preset course. The navigator becomes a system manager, choosing system presets, interpreting system output, and monitoring vessel response.

== See also ==
- Air navigation
- Austronesian navigation
- Celestial navigation
- Galileo positioning system
- Geodetic system
- Great-circle distance explains how to find that quantity if one knows the two latitudes and longitude
- History of geodesy
- History of latitude
- History of longitude
- Ma Jun
- Shen Kuo
- List of explorers
- Maritime history of the United States
- Marshall Islands stick chart
- Navigation
- Polynesian navigation
- Portuguese nautical science
- South-pointing chariot
- Franz Xaver, Baron Von Zach, a scientific editor and astronomer, first located many places geographically
- Rhumbline grid
- Nikola Tesla
