= Latitude (disambiguation) =

Latitude is a geographical term denoting the north–south angular location of a place on the Earth or other celestial bodies.

Latitude may also refer to:

Science and geography

- History of latitude measurements
- Celestial latitude
- Paleolatitude, a term used for paleomagnetism
- Latitude Margaritaville, a retirement village in Daytona Beach, Florida

Technology and business

- Dell Latitude, a brand of laptop computer from Dell
- Cessna Citation Latitude, a type of business jet from Cessna
- Exposure latitude, a photographic term pertaining to over/underexposure of film
- Google Latitude, a location-aware tracking application for mobiles developed by Google
- Latitude Financial Services, an Australian and New Zealand financial services company
- Renault Latitude, a car
- Latitude (company), is a French rocket manufacturing company

Entertainment

- Latitude Festival, a music festival in Suffolk, England
- Latitudes (film), a 2014 Brazilian film
- Latitude, a musical group made up of Craig Peyton and Benjamin Verdery, active ca. 1986

== See also ==
- Lattitude Global Volunteering, British programme for youth volunteering
