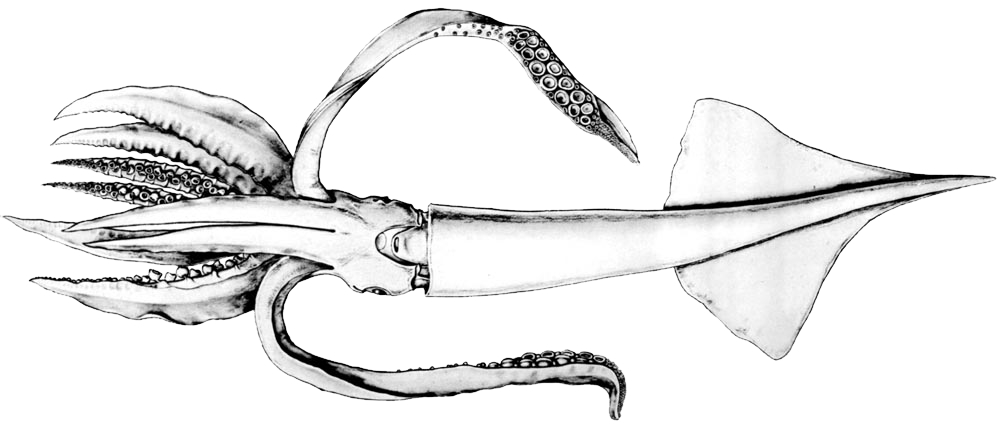
- Mature male

Conservation status
- Least Concern (IUCN 3.1)

Scientific classification
- Kingdom: Animalia
- Phylum: Mollusca
- Class: Cephalopoda
- Order: Oegopsida
- Family: Ommastrephidae
- Subfamily: Ornithoteuthinae
- Genus: Ornithoteuthis
- Species: O. volatilis

Binomial name
- Ornithoteuthis volatilis (Sasaki, 1915)

Synonyms
- Ommastrephes volatilis Sasaki, 1915

= Ornithoteuthis volatilis =

Species of squid

Ornithoteuthis volatilis, the shiny bird squid, is a squid from the subfamily Ommastrephinae, the flying squids, of the family Ommastrephidae part of the pelagic squid order Oegopsida. It is a tropical and sub-tropical species which is widely distributed in the Indo-Pacific oceans. It is slightly larger than the closely related species Ornithoteuthis antillarum of the Atlantic Ocean.

== Description ==
Ornithoteuthis volatilis has a broad head and it has a very narrow muscular mantle which tapers into a long pointed tail, the head is markedly wider than the mantle. It has long fins which are arrow-shaped and sharply lanceolate towards the tail with the rear edges of the fins being concave. The length of the fins is equal to approximately 55% of the mantle length and the fin width is circa 47% of the mantle length. The first to third arms have at least 50 suckers each while each fourth arm has 75, with the suckers on the second and third arms being larger than those on the first and fourth arms. The suckers near the base have severely closely set teeth, of which the middle 1-3 are much more slender and sharply pointed. The largest suckers have 10-14 teeth all of which are sharply pointed and closely set, with long teeth and short teeth set alternately and with the 2 or 3 lowest (i.e. ventral) on either side being the widest and being obliquely pointed. The suckers towards the tip have less than 7 teeth which are separated, slender triangular and sharply pointed except ventral-most on either side which has a wider and less quadrangular shape.

Males have a hectocotylus on the fourth right arm. The basal two thirds of this arm have 14 large, basal suckers followed by 20 reduced suckers with the ventral series is much reduced and some of these suckers are not true suckers but have a nipple like form. The outer third of the arm has 25 pairs of suckers which have their bases swollen into transverse, membranous papillae. These are closely set in two series, the ventral series is comb-like with much smaller rudimentary suckers on tips of papillae, separated by a membranous ridge along middle line. The dorsal protective membrane is absent from the tip of the arm while on the ventral side the protective membrane is normal in basal third of the arm then it broadens and becomes very thick. There is a "honeycomb region" which has 14 pores and a number of grooves and ridges. The pores are arranged in longitudinal series, each having two grooves across them which extend towards the membrane margin, the ridges lie opposite the grooves and connect with one another, where they are edged with numerous small, roundish depressions.

The tentacular clubs are around half of the length of the tentacles, they have 12 suckers in the carpal region each of which has 8–12 conical teeth set on its distal margin with more closely set, broader, more triangular and more oblique teeth set on the proximal margin. The manus has four series of suckers each with 7-9 suckers of which the central two series are much larger; the largest being around 3 times larger than the marginal suckers. These large suckers are wide and deep while the other club suckers are broader than they are deep. The inner margin of the large manus suckers is completely toothed with sharply pointed, slightly curved teeth which alternate with small, plate-like, semicircular teeth, although these teeth are almost absent in the largest suckers. The rings of the suckers on the margins of the club and the dactylus have the sharp, pointed teeth on the proximal margin but these are broader, oblique, triangular and more closely set than similar teeth in the large suckers, the teeth on the distal margin are slender, conical and separated. There are four series of suckers on the dactylus arranged in 27 transverse rows with the dorsal suckers being smaller than those in more ventral sitings. There is a carpal locking apparatus which has 1 or 2 low knobs, no smooth-ringed suckers; this apparatus is rather indistinct in some individuals.

Photophores are distributed in a similar way to O. antillarum, i.e. there are three visceral photophores, an oval, anal photophore, a posterior intestinal photophore and an elongated posterior visceral photophore which forms a strip of pinkish bioluminescent tissue extending from the small photophore to the posterior tip of the mantle cavity. The maximnmim reported size is 250mm mantle length for females and 310mm for males.

== Distribution ==
Ornithoteuthis volatilis is found in the tropical and subtropical waters of the Indo-Pacific. Its latitudinal range in the western Pacific lies between 36°N to 38°S and it extends as far east as the Line Islands, while in the Indian Ocean it ranges from the Arabian Sea south to Madagascar and east to the Timor Sea, south to the waters off eastern Australia. It has been recorded in the Atlantic Ocean off Namibia.

== Habitat and biology ==
Ornithoteuthis volatilis inhabits tropical slopes and oceanic waters where the adults range from the surface waters at night to moderate depths. They occur near the botton in the bathyal zone but in midwater above the continental slope and above sea mounts and ridges. The paralarvae and juveniles can also be found in midwater above great depths at the equator.

It has very small eggs less than 1mm in diameter and spawning is intermittent with several egg masses laid over an extended period. The spermatophores of mature males have a length equivalent to 10.3% of mantle length and the number of spermatophores is around 100 as the male matures the volume of the Needham's sac and of the seminal reservoirs of the spermatophores increases. O. volatilis is a nerito-oceanic species which lives near or over slopes; the non adults are found in midwater in the epipelagic and mesopelagic zones above the tops and slopes of sea mounts and midocean ridges as well as over the continental slopes and oceanic depths. They spawn near the sea bed near sea mounts and mid ocean ridges, and they may make long migrations to these areas. off eastern Australia spawning takes place in the deeper shelf and upper continental slope waters that sit within the warm East Australian Current which originates in the tropics, the size distribution of paralarvae and adults suggests that spawning in occurs throughout the year in this area. In the northern South China Sea spawning runs is from June through to October. In the western North Pacific Ocean this species spawns in the summer and its paralarvae are found in the Kuroshio Current off Japan.

O. volatilis is an actively browsing predator which preys on many different, relatively small animals. Its predators include numerous species of tropical and subtropical pelagic fish such as yellowfin tuna (Thunnus albacares), longnose lancetfish (Alepisaurus ferox), dolphinfish (Coryphaena hyppurus) and swordfish (Xiphias gladius). Sperm whales hunt this species extensively and it is heavily preyed on by the South African fur seal (Arctocephalus pusillus pusillus). It is also an important food item for several shark species including the tiger shark (Galeocerdo cuvier), the scalloped hammerhead shark (Sphyrna lewini) and the smooth hammerhead shark (Sphyrna zygaena). They are capable of short glides in a similar manner to flying fish.
