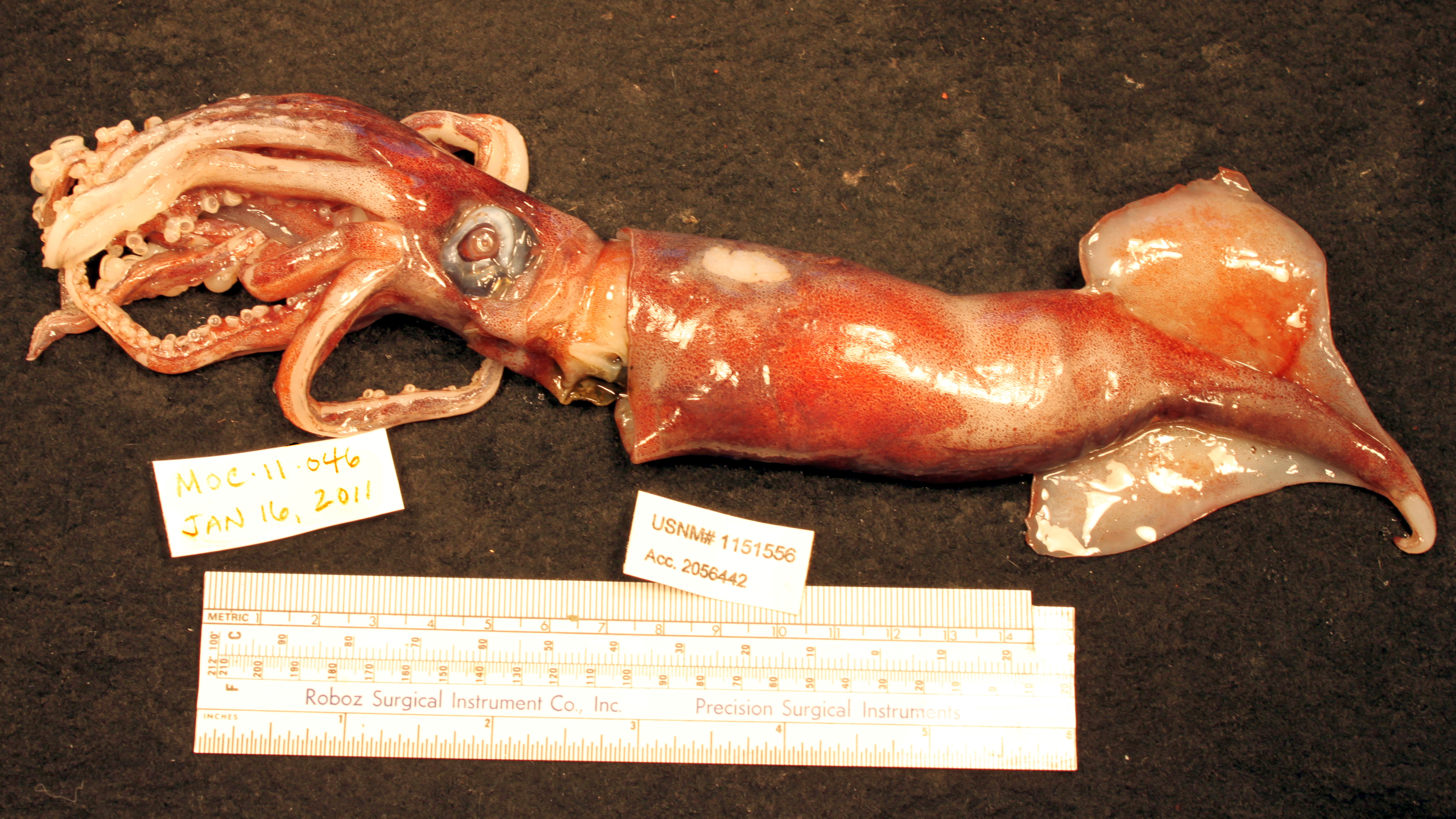

Conservation status
- Least Concern (IUCN 3.1)

Scientific classification
- Kingdom: Animalia
- Phylum: Mollusca
- Class: Cephalopoda
- Order: Oegopsida
- Family: Ommastrephidae
- Subfamily: Ornithoteuthinae
- Genus: Ornithoteuthis
- Species: O. antillarum

Binomial name
- Ornithoteuthis antillarum Adam, 1957

= Ornithoteuthis antillarum =

Species of squid

Ornithoteuthis antillarum, the Atlantic bird squid, is a species of flying squid from the family Ommastrephidae which is found in the warmer waters of the Atlantic Ocean. This species is an important component of the diet of many species of fish and of cetaceans. It is taken as a bycatch in fisheries but has the potential to be commercially important if appropriate fishing methods can be developed.

== Description ==
Ornithoteuthis antillarum has a thin, elongated and muscular mantle which ends in a long, thinly-pointed tail. Its fins are also elongated and are arrow shaped, with sharp tips, concave rear margins and convex forward margins. The largest individual recorded had a mantle length of 300 mm and was from the more northerly extremity of the species' distribution. The length of the fins is more than half that of the mantle. Within the mantle cavity there are three visceral photophores, an oval, anal photophore, a posterior intestinal photophore and an elongated posterior visceral photophore which forms a strip. It has a broad head which is at least as wide as the mantle and there is an elongated photophore patch on the ventral surface of both eyes. The tentacular clubs have a sucker-bearing region which is approximately half of the length of the tentacles with large suckers on the manus with 18-20 widely separated sharp, round and curved teeth on the margin while the suckers on the dactylus are larger in the ventral series and smallest in the dorsal series. The sucker teeth are sexually dimorphic on all of the arms with the females having about 8 plate-like teeth in the proximal margin with the teeth becoming more numerous and pointed in the mid-arm while the males have large plate like teeth on the lateral margins of the mid-arm suckers. The fourth right arm is hectocotylised and has small distal suckers with the skin taking the form of a honeycomb on middle of the arm's ventral surface, this consists of 4 or 5 longitudinal lines of depressions each with 20 to 25 pores.

== Distribution ==
Ornithoteuthis antillarum is found in the tropical and subtropical waters of the eastern and western Atlantic, being found between 20°N and 25°S in the eastern Atlantic and from 40°N to 40°S in the western Atlantic. The type specimen was taken near Basse Terre, Guadeloupe.

== Habitat and biology ==
Ornithoteuthis antillarum is a pelagic, oceanic species which is thought to be commonest near continental slopes. It is at its most abundant at depths between 100m and 600 m. The paralarvae and adults are relatively common in the Gulf of Mexico, the Straits of Florida and in the Gulf Stream, extending south into the Caribbean Sea and to the waters over the continental slope off Brazil. It does not seem to be a schooling species but sampling suggests that it is common from the middle of the water column to very near the bottom, although it has never been reported to sit on the bottom. In the Caribbean this species has been recorded at the surface at night, with many specimens being captured at night over deep bottom depths in the eastern South Atlantic between 100m and 600m in depth. Sampling also suggests that O. antillarum lives above the seabed during the day, dispersing upwards at night, a partial diel migrant.

It is a fast swimmer, which enables it to avoid being caught in nets but it has been observed from submersibles and videoed. It typically rests in the water column in a posture known as the "J" posture, this involves the squid hanging roughly head-down with its arms and tentacles curled and slightly spread back over the head and nearby mantle. O. antillarum is a fast-growing species and its maximum life span is 182 days. Growth rates, as measured on statolith increments which represent daily growth lines, slow markedly as the animal matures. The sex ratio is 1:1 and as the population matures it is believed that they undergo a spawning migration into areas associated with sea mounts. The earlier life stages are found in midwater in epipelagic to mesopelagic zones over slopes, tops and oceanic depths, then the sexually mature adults migrate waters associated with sea mounts and oceanic ridges to spawn on or near the bottom. The spermatophores are 9.0 mm in length and they are found in relatively low numbers compared to related species, with up to 100 but normally 50-60 present in the Needham's sac for each male. The eggs are very small, being 0.7 to 1.0 mm in diameter. They spawn intermittently in pulses or batches laying several egg masses over an extended time with the frequency of spawning and the amount of eggs per mass being roughly the same over the spawning period. The smaller females from the warmer waters of the tropical central-east Atlantic bear between 50 000 to 220 000 oocytes and eggs are laid intermittently in egg masses of up to 1,500 eggs over a spawning period which last from six weeks to three months. Spawning appears to occur throughout the year and there are peaks of spawning activity in April–May, August–September and December–January in the eastern-central Atlantic.

O. antillarum preys on many different types of prey and each individual prey item has a low weight, the most common prey is amphipods but it also eats the larvae and fry of squid and carnivorous fish. An individual with a mantle length of 140 mm was photographed from a submersible at 684 m in depth and a water temperature of 10.7 °C in the Bahamas eating an adult bristlemouth Gonostoma elongata, a midwater fish. Prey changes as the squid matures, the smaller individuals, with a mantle length of less than 4mm, mainly prey on copepods, however krill are probably are more important energetically but they are less frequently taken. One they attain a mantle length of greater than 4mm decapod crustaceans and cephalopods are the most important prey items.

O. antillarum has a number of predators and these include epipelagic and mesopelagic fishes and they have been recorded in the diets of fish such as common dolphinfish (Coryphaena hyppurus), Atlantic sailfishes (Istiophorus albicans), skipjack tuna (Katsuwonus pelamus), white marlin (Tetrapturus albidus), albacore (Thunnus alalunga), yellowfin tuna (Thunnus albacares), bigeye tuna (Thunnus obesus), swordfish (Xiphias gladius). They are also preyed upon by cetaceans) including the pygmy sperm whale (Kogia breviceps) and orca (Orcinus orca). With bony fish, O. antillarum are the most important component of the winter diet of yellowfin tuna off Brazil. It is parasitised mainly by didymozoid trematodes, however, the intensity of infection is much reduced compared to same-sized specimens of Sthenoteuthis pteropus.

== Fisheries ==
Ornithoteuthis antillarum is not a target species for fisheries but may be taken as bycatch, however, it could become a quarry species for commercial fisheries if a suitable fishing technique is developed, because this is a common species which could sustain a harvest and its flesh is firm, muscular and palatable.
