= Roteiro =

Roteiro may refer to

- Roteiro, Alagoas, a Brazilian municipality
- Roteiro (navigation), a Portuguese navigational route map used in the 15th and 16th century
- Adidas Roteiro
