= Ornithoteuthis =

Scientific classification
- Kingdom: Animalia
- Phylum: Mollusca
- Class: Cephalopoda
- Order: Oegopsida
- Family: Ommastrephidae
- Subfamily: Ornithoteuthinae; Nigmatullin, 1979
- Genus: Ornithoteuthis; Okada, 1927

Type species
- Ornithoteuthis volatilis (Sasaki, 1915)

Genus of squids

Ornithoteuthis is a small genus of squid, with two species, from the family Ommastrephidae, the "flying squids", the two species in this genus are known as "bird squids". They are relatively small squid, with mantle lengths of around 100–200 mm (3.9–7.9 in), highly agile and rather uncommon. Their characteristics that distinguish then from other members of the subfamily Ommastrephinae are that their mantle and fins are drawn out into a narrow tail and that they have a luminous stripe along their midline on the viscera.

One species, Ornithoteuthis antillarum, is found in the warmer waters of the Atlantic Ocean and the other, Ornithoteuthis volatilis, in similar areas of the Indo-Pacific oceans, they are closely related and are thought to have been a result of relatively recent speciation.

The genus contains bioluminescent species.

== Species ==
There are two species in this genus:

- Ornithoteuthis antillarum Adam, 1957
- Ornithoteuthis volatilis (Sasaki, 1915)
