= History of latitude =

The Greeks studied the results of the measurements of latitude by the explorer Pytheas, who voyaged to Britain and beyond, as far as the Arctic Circle (observing the midnight sun), in 325 BC. They used several methods to measure latitude, including the height of the Sun above the horizon at midday, measured using a gnōmōn (a word that originally meant an interpreter or judge); the length of the day at the summer solstice, and the elevation of the Sun at winter solstice.

The Greek Marinus of Tyre (CE 70–130) was the first to assign a latitude and longitude to every place on his maps.

From the late 9th century CE, the Arabian Kamal was used in equatorial regions, to measure the height of Polaris above the horizon. This instrument could only be used in latitudes where Polaris is close to the horizon.

The mariner's astrolabe, which gives the angle of the Sun from the horizon at noon (or the angle of a known star at night), was used from around the 15th to the 17th century. The observation of the Sun instead of Polaris enabled the measurement of latitude in the Southern Hemisphere but required the use of solar declination tables. One of the most famous tables, but certainly not the first one, was published in 1496 by the Castilian Jew Abraham Zacut, then exiled in Portugal. The earliest extant descriptions of actual observations of the Sun to measure latitude at sea, attributed to Spanish pilot Andrés de San Martín, were recorded in the first part of Francisco Albo's logbook of the Magellan-Elcano expedition (1519-1522).

The backstaff, which measures the length of a shadow, was used from the 16th century and saw iterative improvements such as the Davis quadrant. These were in use in parallel with the octant and early sextant; the sextant eventually displaced the others, and is still used to this day. The sextant was mentioned by Isaac Newton (1643–1727) in his unpublished writings, and first implemented about 1730 by John Hadley (1682–1744) and Thomas Godfrey (1704–1749).

== See also ==
- History of geodesy
- History of longitude
- History of navigation
- International Latitude Service
- Ocean exploration
