= List of countries by latitude =

The following table lists the regions of the Earth at various latitudes:

Latitude	Locations
90° N	North Pole
75° N	Arctic Ocean; Russia; northern Canada; Greenland
60° N	Oslo, Norway; Helsinki, Finland; Stockholm, Sweden; major parts of Nordic countries in EU; St. Petersburg, Russia; southern Alaska United States; southern border of the Yukon and the Northwest territories in Canada; Shetland, UK (Scotland)
45° N	France; northern Italy; Croatia; Bosnia and Herzegovina; Belgrade, Serbia; Romania; the Black Sea; Ukraine; Russia; the Caspian Sea; Kazakhstan; Uzbekistan; China; Mongolia; Hokkaidō, Japan; United States; Ontario, Canada
30° N	Lebanon; Syria; Morocco; Algeria; Israel; Libya; Giza, Egypt; Jordan; Saudi Arabia; Iraq; Kuwait; the Persian Gulf; Iran; Afghanistan; Pakistan; northern India; Nepal; southern China; southern Japan; northern Mexico; United States
15° N	Senegal; Mauritania; Mali; Burkina Faso; Niger; Chad; Sudan; Eritrea; Yemen; southern India; Myanmar; Thailand; Laos; Vietnam; Philippines; Northern Mariana Islands; southern Mexico; Guatemala; Honduras; Nicaragua; Cape Verde
0°	São Tomé and Príncipe; Gabon; Republic of the Congo; Democratic Republic of the Congo; Uganda; Lake Victoria; Kenya; Somalia; Malaysia; Singapore; Indonesia; Galápagos Islands and Quito, Ecuador; Colombia; Brazil
15° S	Angola; Zambia; Mozambique; Malawi; Madagascar; northern Australia; Vanuatu; French Polynesia; Peru; Bolivia; Brazil
30° S	South Africa; Lesotho; southern Australia; Chile; Argentina; Southern Brazil
45° S	New Zealand; Chile; Argentina
60° S	Entirely ocean (slightly north of the South Orkney Islands); sometimes considered the northern boundary of the Southern Ocean
75° S	Dome C, Antarctica
90° S	South Pole

== See also ==
- List of national capitals by latitude
- List of northernmost items
- List of southernmost items
- Northernmost settlements
- Southernmost settlements
