= Esmeraldo de Situ Orbis =

Manuscript by Duarte Pacheco Pereira

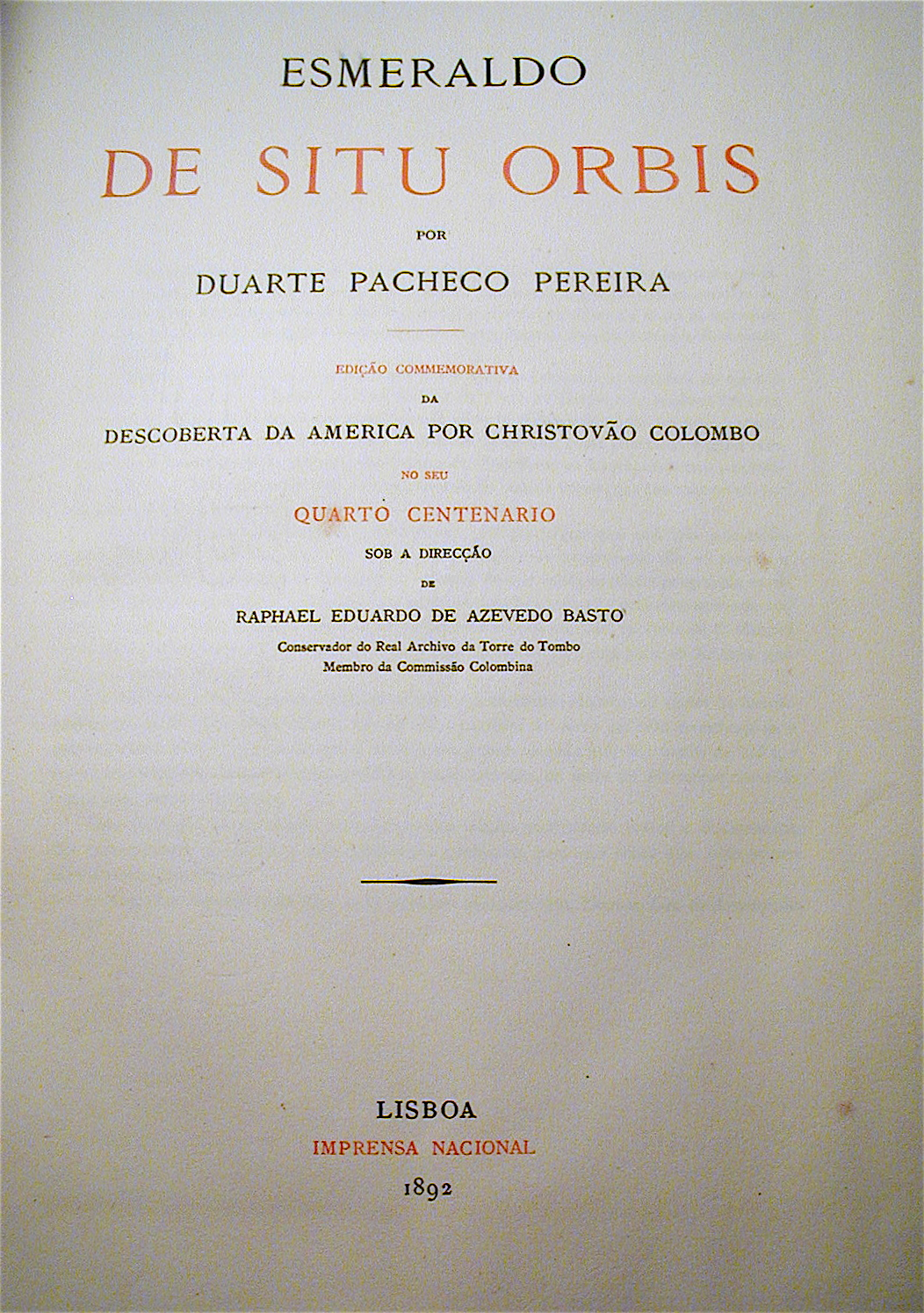
First page of the 1892 edition

Esmeraldo de Situ Orbis is an early modern work on cosmography and Atlantic exploration written by the Portuguese geographer and navigator Duarte Pacheco Pereira.

It was dedicated to King Manuel I of Portugal (1495–1521). The work was divided into five parts with a total of fifty nine chapters and around two hundred pages. Composed in 1506, it dealt, in the author’s own words, with “cosmography and seafaring”. The enigmatic title name appears to be a mixture of Portuguese and Latin. It was written in Portuguese and it featured geographical coordinates for all known ports at the time. The manuscript was most likely written between 1505 and 1508 and was finished by 1508.

== Synopsis ==
Esmeraldo de Situ Orbis describes itself as "a book of cosmography and navigation". It states that, in addition to the continents of Europe, Africa, and Asia, the world had a "fourth part": i.e., America. Eviatar Zerubavel explains that, according to Pacheco Pereira, America encompassed both North and South America.

According to Joaquim Barradas de Carvalho, when Pacheco Pereira composed the Esmeraldo, he was familiar with texts including Sacrobosco’s De sphaera mundi and Pliny’s Natural History.

== The four books ==
The work is divided into four books, combined in a single volume:

- Prologue
- First Book: Discoveries of Henry the Navigator – 33 chapters
- Second Book: Discoveries of Afonso V – 11 chapters
- Third Book: Discoveries of John I – 9 chapters
- Fourth Book: Discoveries of Manuel I – 6 chapters

Duarte Pacheco Pereira references some maps that have disappeared.

It is not clear whether the Esmeraldo was ever finished; it mentions a fifth book, and only a portion of the fourth appears complete in the existing manuscripts.

== Study by Jorge Couto ==
According to a study by the Portuguese historian Jorge Couto of the University of Lisbon, the work was lost for four centuries due to the confidential nature of its content. The title was decrypted as:

- "Esmeraldo" - an anagram of the initials in Latin of the names of Manuel (Emmanuel), the ruler and Duarte (Eduardus), the explorer.
- De Situ Orbis means "on the Geography of the Globe (the Earth)", the title of a work by Pomponius Mela, an early Roman scientist and prominent geographer who inspired Duarte Pacheco Pereira.

Manuel I considered the nautical, geographical and economic information contained in the work so valuable that he never allowed public access. The work consists of a detailed account of voyages to Brazil and to the coast of Africa, the main source of Portugal’s lucrative trade in the 15th century.

== Discovery of Brazil ==
In relation to the Discovery of Brazil, it presents information on the second chapter of the first part, saying:

"Como no terceiro ano de vosso reinado do ano de Nosso Senhor de mil quatrocentos e noventa e oito, donde nos vossa Alteza mandou descobrir a parte ocidental, passando além a grandeza do mar Oceano, onde é achada e navegada uma tam grande terra firme, com muitas e grandes ilhas adjacentes a ela e é grandemente povoada. Tanto se dilata sua grandeza e corre com muita longura, que de uma arte nem da outra não foi visto nem sabido o fim e cabo dela. É achado nela muito e fino brasil com outras muitas cousas de que os navios nestes Reinos vem grandemente povoados."

Translation into English:

"As in the third year of your reign in the year of Our Lord one thousand four hundred and ninety-eight, whence your Highness sent to discover the western part, passing beyond the greatness of the Ocean sea, where such a great land is found and navigated, with many large islands adjacent to it and is heavily populated. Its grandeur expands so much and runs with great length, that one art or the other has not been seen, nor its end and end known. It is found in it very fine Brazil with many other things that ships in these Kingdoms are heavily populated."

It is the first portuguese manuscript that mentioned the coast of Brazil and the abundance of brazilwood (Cesalpina echinata) in existence at the time. In the South Atlantic, among the Oceanic islands presented with their latitudes are:

- A ilha de Sam Lourenço (Fernando de Noronha);
- A ilha d'Acensam (Trindade Island);
- A ilha de S. Crara (Santana Island, off Macaé) and;
- O Cabo Frio

Also in the South Atlantic, the other islands of Saint Helena and what is currently called Ascension Island have been omitted.

== A secret manuscript ==
The manuscript was so rare, in fact, that in 1573 a copy was secretly sent to Philip II of Spain by the Italian spy Giovanni Gesio, under the service of the Spanish ambassador in Lisbon. For the mission, Gesio was regally rewarded with a copy as the payment for his services, a copy of which is now at the library of El Escorial Monastery in Spain.

Esmeraldo de situ orbis was composed between 1505 and 1508, but remained unpublished until the 19th century. Several editions have been published, in Portuguese, French, and English. They are based on two 18th-century manuscripts: one at the Biblioteca Nacional de Portugal and another at the Public Library of Évora. The original manuscript has never been found.

According to Joaquim Barradas de Carvalho, the title “Esmeraldo de situ orbis”, more than a travel book, was a work of erudition encompassing all the recorded knowledge of Portuguese navigations by the late 15th and early 16th centuries.

== Sources ==
- Fage, J.D. (1980). "A Commentary on Duarte Pacheco Pereira's Account of the Lower Guinea Coastlands in his Esmeraldo De Situ Orbis, and on Some Other Early Accounts". History in Africa. 7: 47–80. doi:10.2307/3171656. ISSN 0361-5413. JSTOR 3171656. S2CID 162307023.
- Kimble, George H. T. (1937). "The 'Esmeraldo de Situ Orbis': An Early Portuguese Textbook on Cosmography and Navigation". Osiris. 3: 88–102. doi:10.1086/368471. ISSN 0369-7827. JSTOR 301582. S2CID 144735073.
- Zerubavel, Eviatar (1992). Terra Cognita: The Mental Discovery of America. Rutgers University Press. ISBN 0-8135-1897-0. OCLC 25632160.
