= Craig Peyton =

American musician and film producer

Craig Peyton (born 1953) is an American vibraphonist, drummer, keyboardist, and film producer. His parents operated the Silvermine Arts Center in New Canaan, Connecticut where he developed an appreciation for art. He took lessons under Gary Burton for vibraphone.

== Career ==
Peyton has worked with artists including James Brown, Melba Moore, Nona Hendryx, Levon Helm, and Dan Hartman. Peyton has written underscore music for Friends, the Smithsonian, Nature, alongside many TV productions and jingles.

In 1991 Peyton founded EarthFlight Media, a multi media production and music company that combined his passion for flying, filming and music. A five thousand-hour instrument rated pilot, Peyton learned the craft of aerial cinematography flying his aircraft, a Mooney 201, while filming a full-length music video to support his album, 40 Degrees North.

The Outdoor Life Network had Peyton fly throughout North America filming nature backdrops for a news info program. Peyton produced a one-hour show for Speed Vision titled "The Rebirth of Civil Aviation". Peyton hosted BET's Jazz Central program, featuring many of his aerial "Visual Music" productions.

Peyton's industrial work includes turnkey productions for major aviation companies. Peyton's aerial photography has contributed to many films, including The Island of Dr. Moreau (1996), Storm (1999), Along Came Polly, The Punisher (2004) and What tнē #$*! D̄ө ωΣ (k)πow!? (2006), and music videos including Jay-Z, Beyoncé and TLC, as well as numerous TV and feature releases.
