= Roteiro (navigation) =

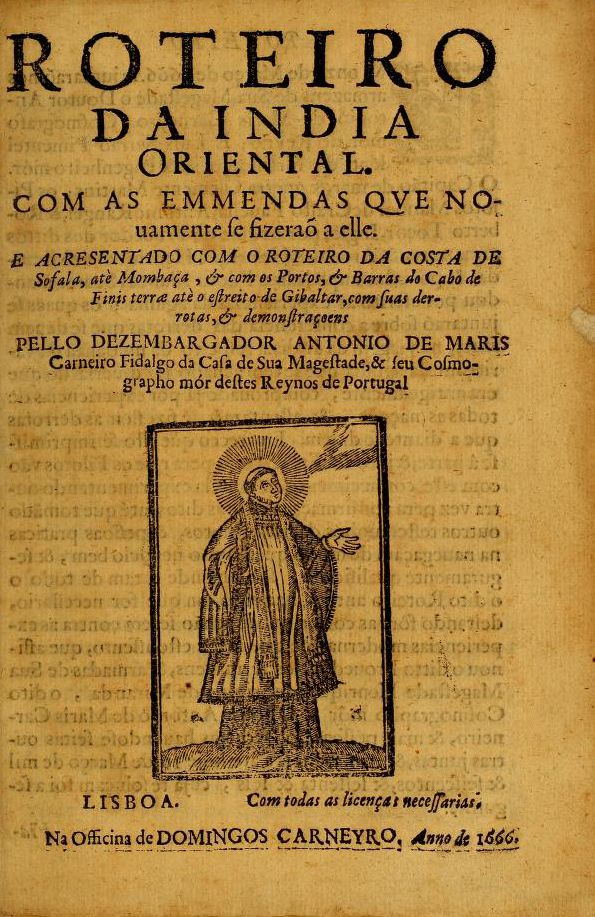

Roteiro (from Portuguese rota, route) is the name given to a handbook for the use of maritime pilots and sailors. The Portuguese term is cognate and approximate synonym of the English rutter. Roteiro is applied generally to maritime literature in use from the 16th to the 19th centuries, and specifically to nautical route descriptions compiled by and for sailors and pilots.

The Portuguese word 'roteiro' is also a cognate of the French routier, and Spanish derrotero, all derived ultimately from Late Latin rupta (sc. via), a “broken” path, as in English path-breaking. Over time, the roteiros, especially oceanic roteiros, evolved to include ethnographic, astronomical, trigonometrical and other data useful for blue water navigation.

Well-known roteiros are:

- O Livro de Francisco Rodrigues (cartographer), ca. 1525.
- Simão de Oliveira, Arte de navegar, 1606.
- Manuel de Figueiredo, Roteiro e navegação das Indias Occidentais, Ilhas, Antilhas do Mar Oceano Occidental... (1609)
- Aleixo da Mota’s roteiro of the 1600s, describing the route from India along the African coast.
- The 1666 Roteiro da India Oriental by Antonio de Maris Carneiro, which describes the coastline from Sofala to Mombasa, noting harbours and sandbars, Cape Finisterre and the Strait of Gibraltar.
- The 1823 Roteiro da costa do Maranhaõ ePará by António Gregório de Freitas, covering the coastline of Maranhão and Pará.
