= Needham's sac =

Cephalopod organ

Needham's sac (also called a spermatophore sac) is the part of the reproductive tract of cephalopods in which spermatophores are stored. Spermatophores are complex structures consisting of ropes of sperm and in some species include an ejaculatory apparatus and a cement body.

Needham's sac opens into the left side of the mantle cavity. During copulation of some cephalopod species, the hectocotylus transfers the spermatophore from Needham's sac into the mantle cavity of the female. The cement body helps the spermatophore adhere to the female.
