= Hebdo =

Hebdo is French slang for a newsweekly. It may refer to:

- Hebdo (European Commission), a weekly meeting of the European Commission
- Charlie Hebdo, a weekly French satirical newspaper
- L'Hebdo, a weekly French-language news magazine published in Lausanne, Switzerland.
- hebdo-, an archaic decimal metric prefix
