= Zero force member =

In the field of engineering mechanics, a zero force member is a member (a single truss segment) in a truss which, given a specific load, is at rest: neither in tension, nor in compression.

== Description ==
In a truss, a zero-force member is often found at pins (any connections within the truss) where no external load is applied, and three or fewer truss members meet. Basic zero-force members can be identified by analyzing the forces acting on an individual pin in a physical system.

If the pin has an external force or moment applied to it, then all of the members attached to that pin are not zero-force members unless the external force acts in a manner that fulfills one of the rules:

- If two non-collinear members meet in an unloaded joint, both are zero-force members.
- If three members meet in an unloaded joint, of which two are collinear, then the third member is a zero-force member.

Restated for clarity, when there are no external loads at a pin joint, the two rules that determine zero-force members are:

- If a joint in a truss has only two non-collinear members and no external load or support reaction is applied at that joint, then both members are zero-force members.
- If three members form a joint and two of these members are collinear while the third member is not, and no external load or support reaction is applied at the joint, the third non-collinear member is a zero-force member.

== Reasons to include zero force members in a truss system ==
It is a common practice to eliminate zero force members from a truss to simplify analysis. Although an absolute minimalist design might eliminate all zero force elements from a truss, there are still sound reasons to retain some of these components in actual built systems:

- These members can contribute to the stability of the structure by preventing buckling of long, slender members under compressive forces
- These members can increase rigidity when variations are introduced in the normal external loading configuration, including dynamic and variable forces.

== See also ==
- Structural engineering
- Neutral plane
