= Myriagram =

The myriagram (French: myriagramme) is a former French and metric unit of mass equal to 10,000 grams (myriad being the Greek word for ten thousand). Although never as widely used as the kilogram, the myriagram was employed during the 19th century as a replacement for the earlier American customary system quarter, which was equal to 25 pounds (11,340 g).

In 1975, the United States, having previously authorized use of the myriagram in 1866, declared the term no longer acceptable.

== See also ==
- myria-
- History of the International System of Units
