= Myria- =

Obsolete metric prefix

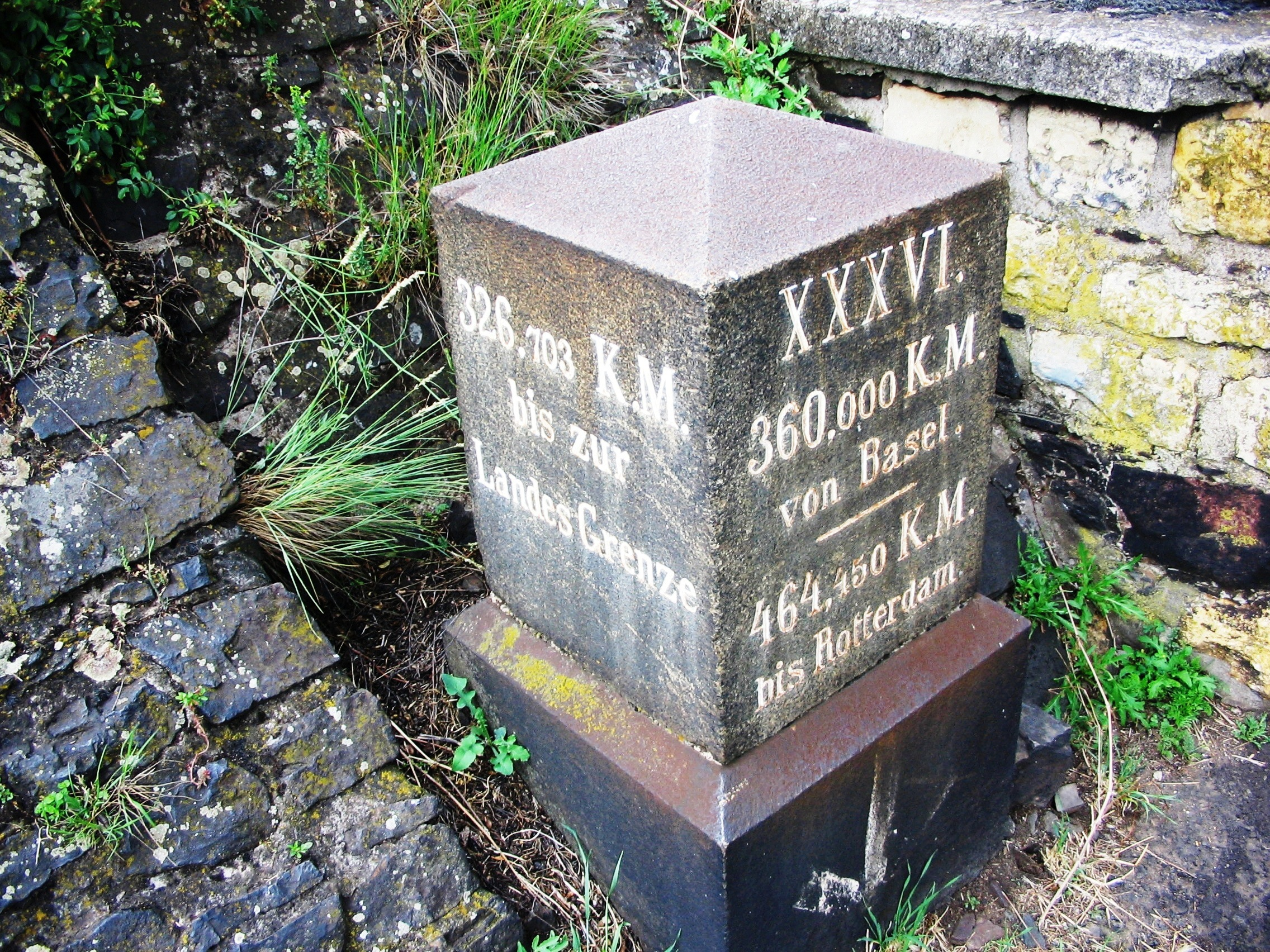
Distance marker on the Rhine: 36 (XXXVI) myriametres from Basel. Note that the stated distance is 360 km; comma is the decimal mark in Germany.

Myria- is a now obsolete decimal metric prefix denoting a factor of 10^{4} (ten thousand). It originates from the Greek μύριοι (mýrioi) (myriad). The prefix was part of the original metric system adopted by France in 1795, but was not adopted when the SI prefixes were internationally adopted by the 11th CGPM conference in 1960.

In 1685 John Wallis proposed the usage of myrio. Also, in 19th century English it was sometimes spelled myrio, in line with a puristic opinion by Thomas Young.

The myriametre (10 km) is occasionally encountered in 19th-century train tariffs, or in some classifications of wavelengths as the adjective myriametric. The French mesures usuelles (1812–1839) did not include any units of length greater than the toise, but the myriametre remained in use throughout this period. In Sweden and Norway, the myriametre is still common in everyday use. In these countries this unit is called mil. Of units customarily used in trade in France, the myriagramme (10 kg) was the metric replacement for an avoirdupois unit, the quartier (25 pounds). Isaac Asimov's novel Foundation and Empire still mentioned the myriaton in 1952.

Existence of four prefixes beginning with the letter M (mega-, myria-, milli-, micro-) and the need to create short symbols for prefixes ultimately led to demise of the prefix myria-. In 1905 the Comité International des Poids et Mesures (CIPM) assigned it the symbol M, wishing to use only single-letter symbols. This meant that myriameter, for example, was abbreviated Mm. But in the first part of the twentieth century, electrical engineers began to use capital M for the prefix mega-, as in megawatt and megohm. This usage became so widely and firmly adopted that in 1935 the CIPM adopted the prefix mega- with M as its symbol, dropping the myria- entirely. In 1975, the United States, having previously authorized use of the myriameter and myriagram in 1866, declared the terms no longer acceptable. The symbol ma was used in French documents of 1919 and 1948.

== See also ==
- Myriagon, a polygon with 10,000 sides
- Myriapoda, a subphylum containing centipedes, millipedes etc.
- dimi- (aka decimilli-, a former French metric prefix denoting the inverse (10^{−4}) of the myria- prefix up to 1961
- hebdo-, a prefix meaning 10^{7}
- Obsolete metric prefix
