= Henri Tresca =

French mechanical engineer

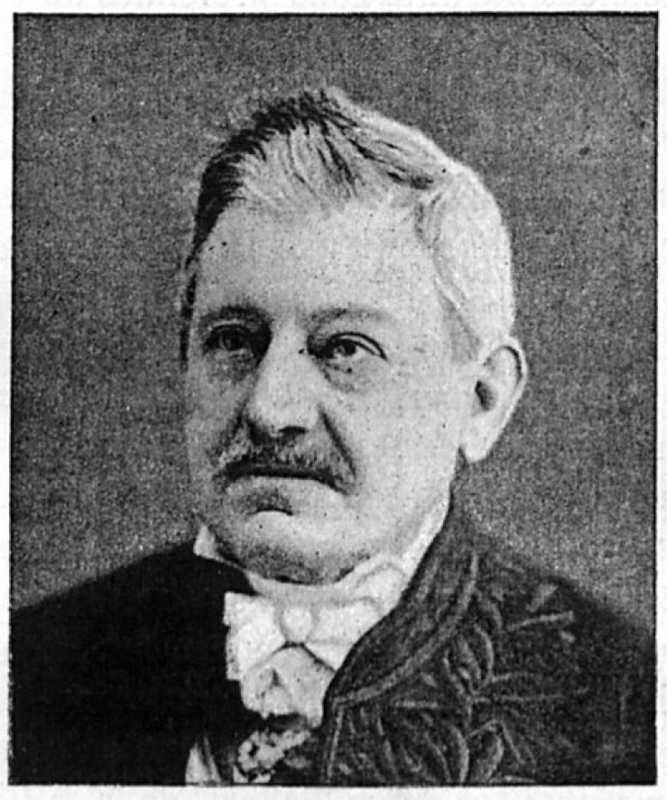
- Born: 12 October 1814; Dunkirk, France
- Died: 21 June 1885 (aged 70); Paris, France
- Engineering career
- Discipline: Mechanical
- Institutions: American Society of Mechanical Engineers, French Academy of Sciences

Henri Édouard Tresca (12 October 1814 – 21 June 1885) was a French mechanical engineer, and a professor at the Conservatoire National des Arts et Métiers in Paris.

== Work on plasticity ==
He is the father of the field of plasticity, or non-recoverable deformations, which he explored in an extensive series of experiments begun in 1864. He stated one of the first criteria of material failure, that now bears his name. The criterion specifies that a material would flow plastically if

$\ \sigma_{tresca}=\sigma_1-\sigma_3 > \sigma_{max}$

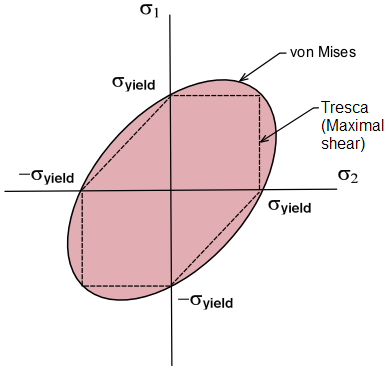
Comparison of Tresca and von Mises criteria

Tresca's criterion is one of two main failure criteria used today for ductile materials. The second important criterion is due to Richard von Mises. See comparison on the image left:

== Design of the International Prototype Metre ==
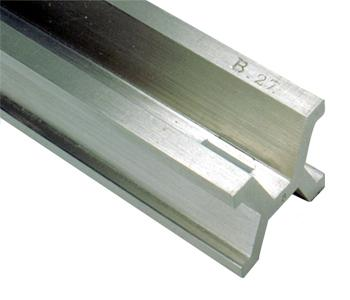
National standard meter #27, primary US standard until 1960, with Tresca section.

Tresca was also among the designers of the prototype metre bar that served as the first standard of length for the metric system. After the Convention of the Metre had been signed in 1875, the International Bureau of Weights and Measures (BIPM) in Sèvres, France made 28 prototype line standards of platinum-iridium. The bars had a cross section shaped like a modified letter X, designed by Tresca, called the "Tresca section". The Tresca section was designed to provide maximum stiffness. In addition, one surface of the central rib that joined the arms was designed to coincide with the bar's neutral plane, the mathematical plane inside the bar that didn't change length when the bar bent. The two marks near each end of the bar which defined the meter were ruled on this surface. Thus, to first order, the distance between the marks wouldn't change due to the slight sagging of the bar under its own weight between support points. One of the bars was selected as the International Metre. The United States received National Prototype Metres No. 27 and No. 21 in 1890. When the Mendenhall Order in 1893 declared the meter to be the fundamental length standard, No. 27 became the US primary national standard for all length measurements. It remained so until 1960.

== Recognition ==
Tresca was made an honorary member of the American Society of Mechanical Engineers in 1882.

Tresca's stature as an engineer was such that Gustave Eiffel put his name on number 3 in his list of 72 people making the Eiffel tower in Paris possible.

== See also ==
- Yield surface
- von Mises stress
- Mohr–Coulomb theory
- Adiabatic shear band
- Yield (engineering)
- Stress
- Strain
- 3-D elasticity
- Viscoplasticity
