= Hebdo- =

Obsolete SI unit prefix

Hebdo- (symbol H) is an obsolete decimal metric prefix equal to 10^{7}. It is derived from the Greek hebdοmos (Greek: ἕβδομος) meaning seventh.

The definition of one hebdomometre or hebdometre as 10000000 metres was originally proposed by Rudolf Clausius for use in an absolute electrodynamic system of units named the quadrant–eleventhgram–second system (QES system) in the 1880s. It was based on the meridional definition of the metre, which established one ten-millionth of an Earth quadrant, or the distance from the geographical pole to the equator, as a metre.

== See also ==
- 10,000,000
- Crore, South Asian term for 10^{7}
- Metric units
- Numeral prefix
