= Georges Perrier (geodesist) =

French geodesist and general (1872–1946)

Général Georges Perrier
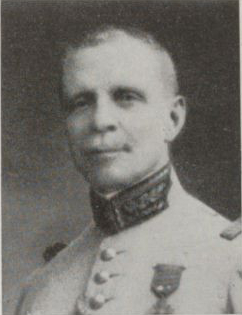
- Perrier in 1937
- Born: 28 October 1872; Montpellier
- Died: 16 February 1946 (aged 73); Paris
- Other names: George Perrier (misspelling); G. Perrier; G. P.
- Father: François Perrier

Academic background
- Education: École polytechnique

Academic work
- Notable students: Pierre Tardi

Général Georges-François Perrier (28 October 1872 – 16 February 1946) was a French geodesist and military general. From 1922 to 1946, (Note: Some sources attribute this date to 1945, but biographical articles on Perrier say he served as secretary until his death, which was in 1946.) he served as secretary general of the International Association of Geodesy and from 1922 to 1945 as 1st editor-in-chief of the Bulletin Géodésique. He was a teacher to Pierre Tardi, who succeeded Perrier in both these capacities in 1946. Perrier wrote the preface to Tardi's 1934 Traité de Géodésie, and the two were also editors of the Bibliographie Géodesique Internationale.

Born in Montpellier on 28 October 1872, he was christened Antoine François Jacques Justin Georges Perrier. Though his father, geodesist François Perrier died when Georges was only 16, he decided to follow in his father's footsteps, joining the École polytechnique in 1892. After graduating, in 1898, he joined the Service géographique de l'armée.

In 1901, while a member of the service, he was made a part of the French party sent to the equator in South America for remeasurements of results from an 18th-century expedition. The weather was notably an issue during this mission. Following the necessary parts of his work in South America, he remained in the region—he was there for five years total—where he gained a working knowledge of Spanish. Late in 1906, he returned to France and published his findings from the mission. He married soon after returning, and had eight children, of which two sons died before starting their careers.

He spent time serving on multiple boundary commissions until the outbreak of World War I. He had already been promoted to the rank of captain from his work in South America, so during the course of the war he was promoted to major and lieutenant colonel, as well as being honored with the rank of commander in the Legion d'Honneur. During the interwar period and into the course of World War II, Perrier was involved with multiple roles in geodesy organizations. Starting in 1919, he was chief of the Service géographique de l'armée's geodesy section, and he later became secretary of the International Association of Geodesy. From 1929 to 1931 he served as president of the Société astronomique de France.

When World War II broke out, all elected members within the International Association of Geodesy remained in their positions until elections could resume after the war. Perrier died on 16 February 1946; his last words were disappointment of not being able to work on geodesy any longer.
