= Pierre Tardi =

French scientist (1897–1972)

Pierre Antoine Ernest Tardi (4 June 1897 – 5 August 1972) was a French geophysicist, astronomer, and geographer. From 1946 to 1960, he was the secretary general of the International Association of Geodesy, and editor-in-chief of the Bulletin Géodésique from 1946 to 1951. He also served as president of the Société astronomique de France from 1964 to 1966.

Born in Bastia on 4 June 1897, Tardi enlisted in World War I in 1915. Following the war, in 1920, he joined the geodesy section of the Service géographique de l'armée. He published his first treatise on geodesy in 1934, for which he won an award conferred by the Academy of Sciences. One notable milestone during has geodetic career was at the 1936 International Union of Geodesy and Geophysics meeting, where, in an effort to standardize mapping of the region, he suggested an idea to split the continent of Africa into a grid system. His proposal was quickly accepted, but struggled to be actually adopted. A bibliography—his Bibliographie géodesique internationale—was published in 1937. In 1946, Tardi was made the president of the International Association of Geodesy, succeeding George Perrier. (Note: Also spelled Georges Perrier; he was a teacher of Tardi.)

In 1952, Tardi served on the inaugural advisory committee of Ohio State University's Institute of Geodesy, Photogrammetry and Cartography, along with other geodesists such as Walter Davis Lambert. In 1956, while secretary general of the International Association of Geodesy, Tardi formed a committee on tidal research; Lambert also sat on this committee. He was a professor at l'École polytechnique when he was elected to the Academy of Sciences in 1956. In 1962, Tardi became a corresponding member of the Bayerische Akademie der Wissenschaften. He served as vice president of the French Academy of Sciences in 1969, and as president of the academy in 1970. He died in Paris on 5 August 1972.
