= François Perrier (French Army officer) =

French soldier (1833 - 1888)

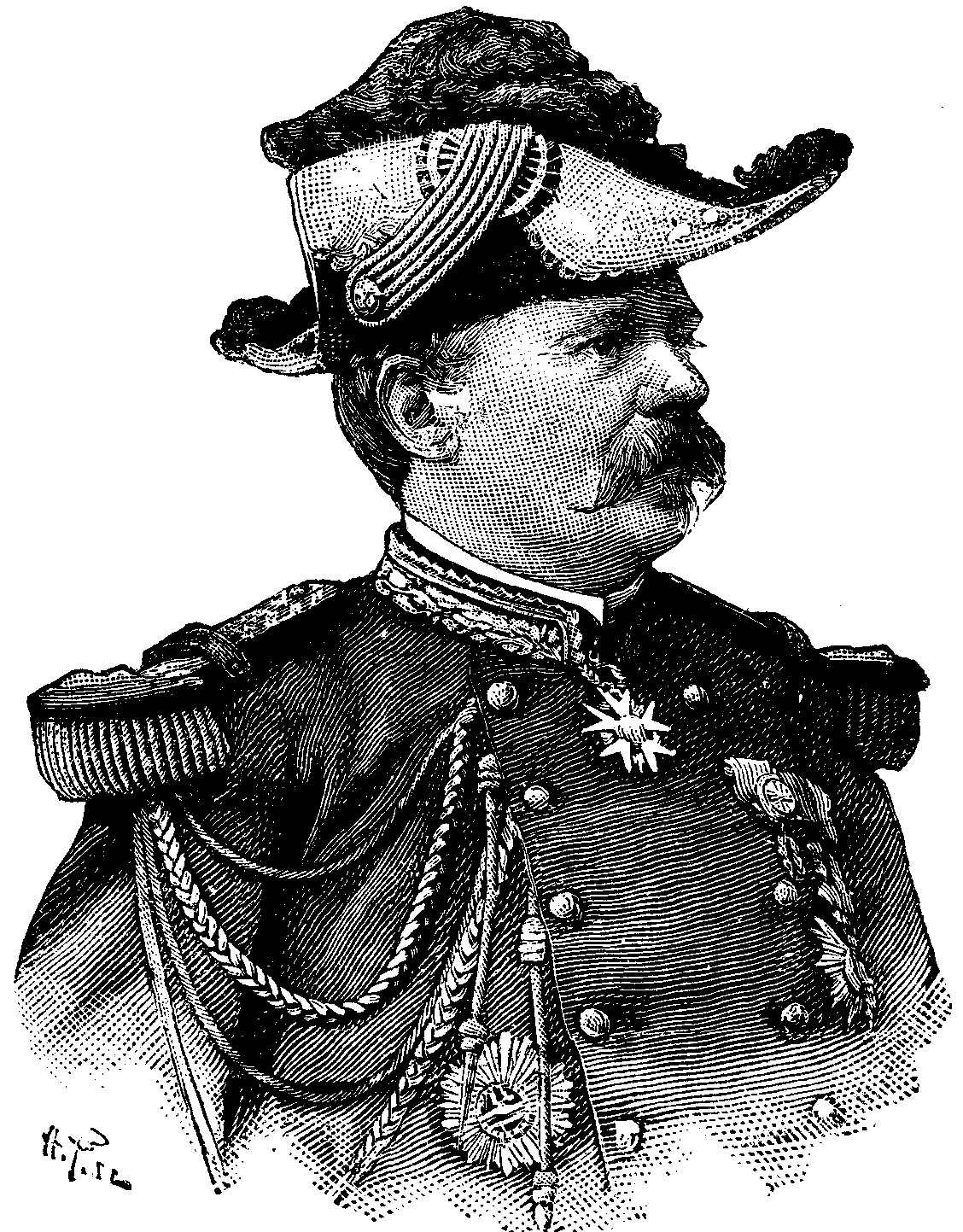
General François Perrier

François Perrier (French pronunciation: [fʁɑ̃swa pɛʁje]; 18 April 1833 – 20 February 1888) was a French soldier and geodesist.

== Life ==
Perrier was born at Valleraugue (Gard), descended from a family of Protestants, of Cevennes. After finishing his studies at the Lyceum of Nimes and at St. Barbe College, he was admitted to the École polytechnique in 1853, leaving in 1857 as a staff officer.

He was promoted to lieutenant in 1857, captain in 1860, major of cavalry in 1874, lieutenant-colonel in 1879, and he received his brigadier-general's star the year before his death. He was commander of the Légion d'honneur and president of the council-general of his department. In 1872, he married Caroline Benoît, daughter of Justin Benoît, professor of anatomy at the University of Montpellier. Their son, Georges Perrier followed the same career as his father up to the same rank, functions and honours.

=== Science ===
General Perrier long ago made a name for himself in science. After some noteworthy publications on the trigonometrical junction of France and England (1861) and on the triangulation and leveling of Corsica (1865), he was put at the head of the Geodesic Service of the French Army in 1879. In 1880, he was sent as a delegate to the conference of Berlin for the settling of the boundaries of the new Greco-Turkish frontiers. In January of the same year, he was elected a member of the Académie des Sciences, as successor to Urbain Dortet de Tessan. He was a member of the Bureau des Longitudes from 1875.

In 1882, Perrier was sent to Florida to observe the transit of Venus, where his observations were reported to be complete success. His celebrity continued to increase through his last triangulating operations in Algeria.

General Perrier's merits led to his being appointed Head of the Geographical Service of the Army.

General Perrier died at Montpellier on 20 February 1888 and he is buried at the Protestant cemetery of Montpellier.

== Honours ==
His name is one of the 72 names inscribed on the Eiffel Tower.
